= Gibson Les Paul Doublecut =

Electric guitar

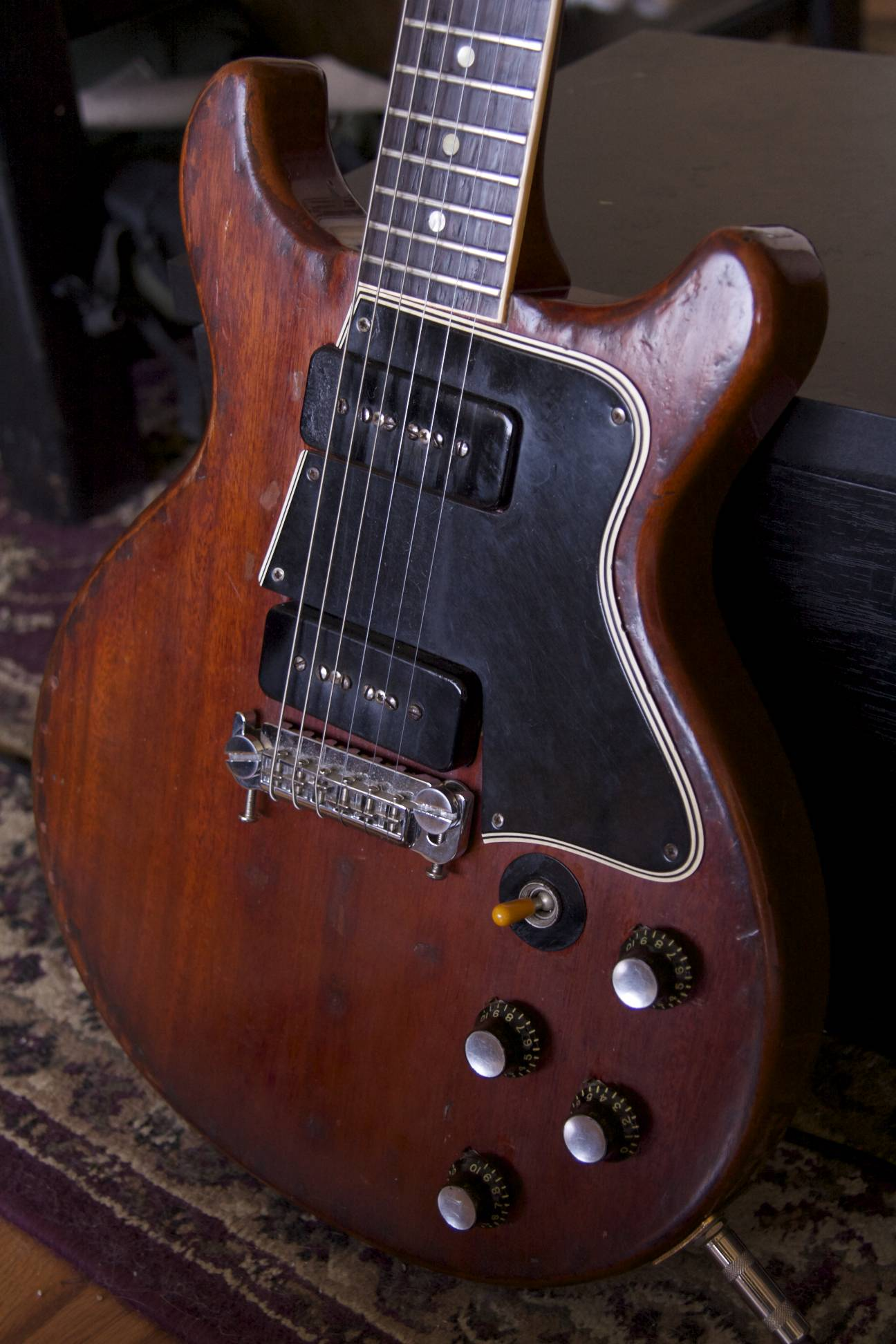
1960 SG Special renamed from "Les Paul Special Doublecut" in the late 1959, due to the discontinuation of Les Paul affiliation.

The Gibson Les Paul Doublecut is a double-cutaway version of the Gibson Les Paul electric guitar.

== Models ==
Except for Gibson Custom Shop/Historic models, there are currently four types of the Les Paul double cut model.

- Les Paul Studio,

Standard & Pro Doublecut|Les Paul Doublecut 'Pro

- Les Paul Faded Doublecut
- Les Paul Standard Doublecut Plus
- Les Paul DC AA Top

Custom Shop models

- Les Paul Doublecut Longhorn

Historic models include

- Les Paul Special Doublecut (1958-1959, ...) / SG Special (1959-1961)
  - 1960 Les Paul Special Double Cutaway VOS (reissue)
  - Custom 1960 Les Paul Special Double Cutaway (reissue)
- Les Paul Junior Doublecut (1958-1961, ...)
  - 1958 Les Paul Junior Double Cutaway VOS (reissue)

=== Les Paul Junior Doublecut ===
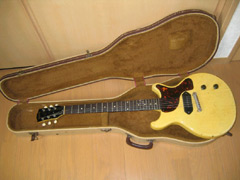
1959 Gibson Les Paul Junior (TV Yellow)

One of the first Les Paul Doublecut is the Les Paul Junior Doublecut released in 1958. Like the singlecut version of the LP Junior, it has a single "dog-eared" P-90 single coil pickup. This Les Paul doublecut is currently only available as a Gibson Custom Shop/Historic Reissue model, called the "1958 Junior Doublecut." The Junior, in both its singlecut and doublecut forms, was originally Gibson's "student" model. The initial price of the Les Paul Junior was originally $49.50.

=== Les Paul Special Doublecut ===
It is also one of the least expensive Les Paul guitars available. It appears that Gibson has since decided to discontinue much of the faded lines, including the Les Paul Special Double cut for its 2009 lineup.

A much more expensive and historically accurate version of this guitar, the 1960 Les Paul Special, is available as a Custom Shop/Historic Reissue model.

For many years after 1960 no Les Paul Doublecut guitars were produced by Gibson, and when Gibson did start making doublecut Les Pauls again, they were re-issues closely following the original Les Paul Special flat-top (no carved maple cap) design, with P-90 pickups rather than humbucker pickups. In the interim, during the 1970s, a small boutique USA guitar producer, Hamer, began making both flat-top and carved-top doublecutaway guitars very similar to the then-dormant Gibson designs. These Hamer versions of doublecutaway Les Pauls got widespread publicity for their use by the members of the rock band Cheap Trick and others.

=== Les Paul Faded Doublecut ===
The Faded Doublecut has its origin in the Les Paul Special Doublecut, which is an all-mahogany flat-top guitar with P-90 pickups first produced from 1958–1960. The "Faded" model is called such because the nitrocellulose finish is not thick and glossy like the original vintage examples or Custom Shop double cut Les Pauls. This finish style is easily susceptible to play wear, thus many examples appear to have been "relic'ed" in the factory, but the wear is real. The body is composed of multiple mahogany (usually four) pieces and is sold with a gig-bag (as opposed to a hard-case).

Doublecut design

The Doublecut had one major design change: the original models had the neck pickup mounted closer to the neck/body join which resulted in a weak neck join. This was changed by moving the neck pick up further into the body.

Other faded finish models

The "Faded Doublecut" is one of a series (at least as of 2007) "faded" models being the SG, Les Paul (single cut with humbuckers) and Flying V. All of these models are made in the USA.

=== Les Paul Standard & Pro Doublecut ===
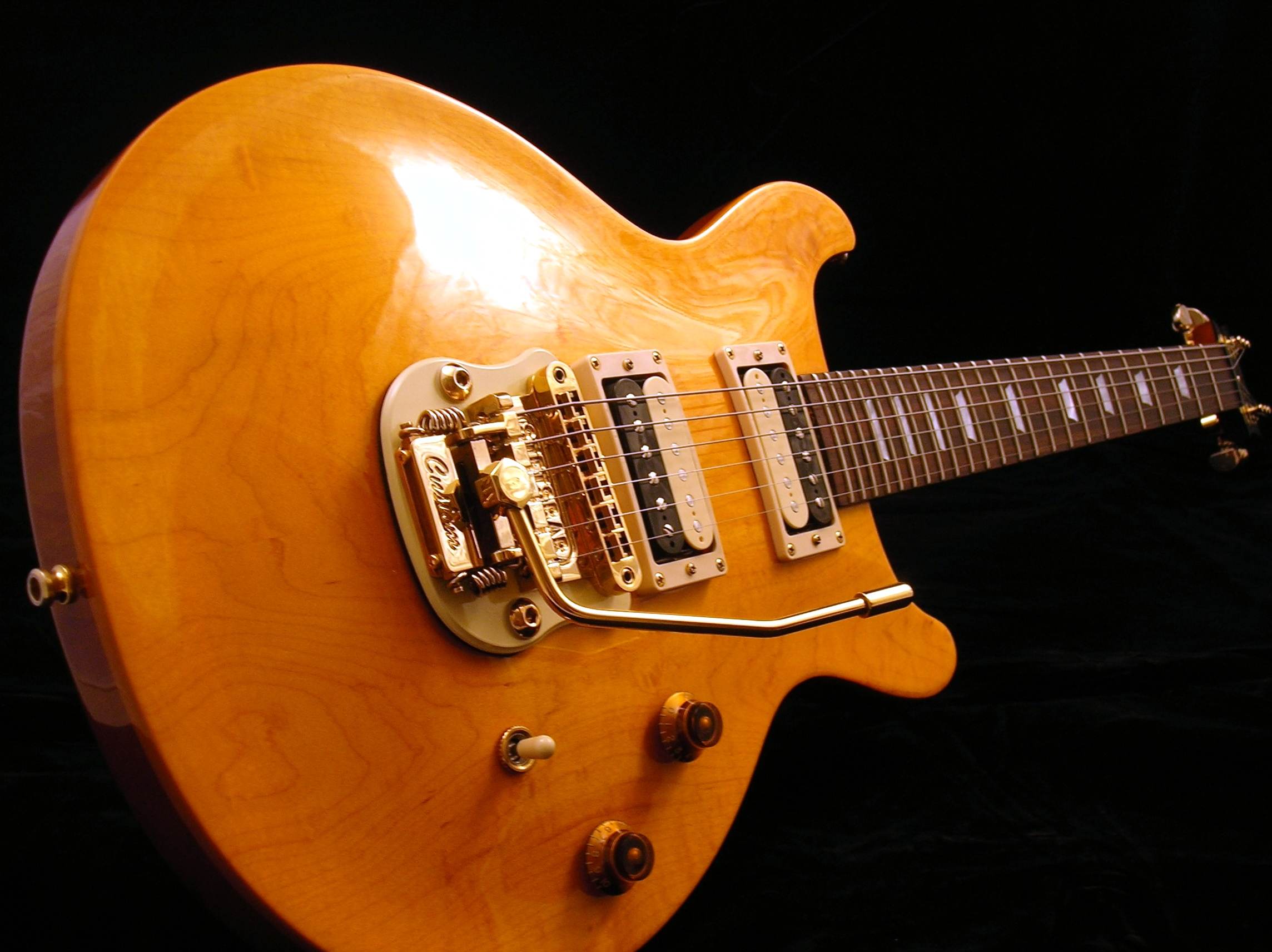
Gibson Les Paul DC (with stetsbar)

The Les Paul Standard and Pro models of the doublecut LP are a newer concept, based on an arched-top Les Paul with humbucker pickups, similar to the Hamer design. The Pro has 22 frets; the Standard has 24 frets. The Standard "Plus" has gold hardware. Unlike other 2-pickup single cutaway Les Pauls, these Gibson doublecutaway versions have one master volume and one master tone control (singlecut Les Pauls with two pickups have two sets of tone and volume controls, one for each pickup). Many believe these newer archtop doublecut Les Pauls were developed in response to the high-end guitars of Gibson competitor Paul Reed Smith (PRS), whose PRS guitars most typically have a doublecut design and master tone and volume controls, and whose production eventually went from a small shop (as Hamer's has stayed) to an assembly-line production rivaling Gibson's. This opinion is further supported by the fact that the first of Gibson's archtop doublecut Les Pauls, the now-discontinued Les Paul Studio doublecut (produced in the late 1990s), had 24 frets, as opposed to Gibson's more standard 22 frets. 24-fret necks are featured on some PRS guitars, and are more popular with heavy metal players who often solo at the high end of the neck.

== Notable users ==
- Billie Joe Armstrong uses and has released a Signature version alongside the release of the Green Day albums Uno Dos Tre!
- Matt Bellamy, the guitarist of the English band Muse, used the Les Paul Doublecut Lite before he started using custom Manson guitars.
- Alana Haim uses a Gibson Les Paul Classic Goldtop Double Cutaway during many recordings, live shows, photoshoots and music videos with the band.
- Keith Richards of the Rolling Stones plays a 1957 Gibson Les Paul double cut in TV Model Yellow. It's always used on "Midnight Rambler" with a capo at the 7th fret and played with standard tuning.
- Johnny Thunders played a late 1950s double cutaway Les Paul Junior.
- Bob Welch of Fleetwood Mac used a black Gibson Les Paul Doublecut.
- Peter Tosh of The Wailers
- Thomas Erak of The Fall of Troy
- Guy Picciotto of Fugazi
- Jason White of Green Day uses Les Pauls on stage mostly
- Jay Farrar of Son Volt plays a Les Paul Special Doublecut with a mini humbucker in the bridge position.
- Mary Timony of Ex Hex plays a Doublecut with a custom mirrored pick guard almost exclusively.
- Johnny Bond of Catfish and the Bottlemen plays a Les Paul Special Doublecut.
- Rod Price of Foghat used an extensively modified '50s era Les Paul Special Doublecut with '50s PAF pickups for slide guitar; usually tuned to Open E tuning.
- Rick Beato has an eponymous signature Gibson Les Paul Special Doublecut.

== See also ==
- Gibson Melody Maker (1959–1971) – an entry-level guitar model similar to Les Paul Junior but with thinner body.
- Gibson Spirit (1972–1985) – a guitar model similar to Les Paul Junior DC but with cutaway at 20th fret.
