= Gibson Les Paul Junior =

Solid-body electric guitar

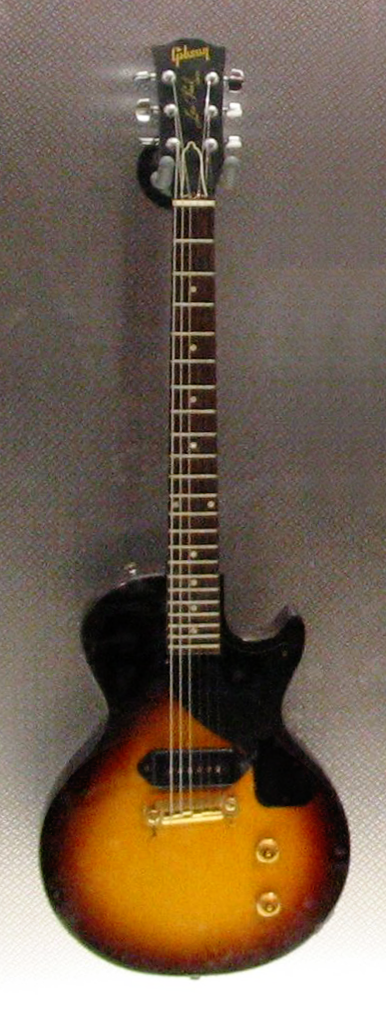
- Gibson Les Paul Junior
- Manufacturer: Gibson
- Period: 1954–1961; 1961–1963 (in SG shape); 1986–1992; 1995–1996; 2001–2002; 2008–2012; 2015–2016; 2019– present

Construction
- Body type: Solid
- Neck joint: Set
- Scale: 24.75"

Woods
- Body: Mahogany
- Neck: Mahogany
- Fretboard: Rosewood, Ebony

Hardware
- Bridge: Wraparound
- Pickup(s): 1 P-90, 2 P-90s, 1 humbucker, 1 H-90 (Billie Joe Armstrong signature model only)

Colors available
- Sunburst, Ebony, TV Yellow, White, Red

The Gibson Les Paul Junior is a solid-body electric guitar introduced in 1954 as an affordable, entry-level Les Paul. It was first released with a single-cutaway body style; models with a double-cutaway body style were introduced in 1958. The Junior continued through the first three years of the Les Paul/SG body redesign. The initial run was discontinued in 1963.

== History ==
The Les Paul Junior was designed as a high-quality, affordable guitar. Gibson stripped the standard Les Paul down to the basics: no binding, no carved top, one pickup, and just one volume and tone knob. The Junior was equipped with one P-90 "dog-ear" pickup at the bridge, which was actually a stop tailpiece from the standard Les Paul. It was originally released in sunburst in mid-1954.

In 1955 Gibson launched the Les Paul TV model, which was identical to the Junior except for the name and a fashionable contemporary "limed oak" style finish, later more accurately named "limed mahogany". This natural wood finish with white grain filler often aged into a natural wood or dull yellow appearance, and eventually evolved into the opaque mustard yellow, popularly called "TV yellow". The intention was not to avoid glare from old TV cameras, but to offer a modern look and a name to promote The Les Paul & Mary Ford Show then on television. The double-cutaway model was introduced in 1958, nearly doubling Junior sales.

In the 1960s and 1970s the Les Paul Junior became very popular because of its simplicity and unique tone when played through an overdriven amplifier. The P-90 pickup and simple bridge give the guitar a distinct sound that was desired by rock and blues players of the time, including Leslie West of Mountain, Luther Grosvenor (a.k.a. Ariel Bender) of Spooky Tooth and Mott the Hoople, Johnny Thunders of The New York Dolls and The Heartbreakers, and Glenn Frey of The Eagles. A Les Paul Junior (with a Charlie Christian pickup added in the neck position) also became John Lennon's main guitar during his post-Beatles years. Martin Barre of Jethro Tull recorded the entire Aqualung album with a 1957 Les Paul Junior, including the extended guitar solo of the title track. Steve Howe used one with a different bridge on Tales from Topographic Oceans to overcome tuning problems he had with the guitar, where it was his key instrument on sides two, three, and four.

It is also used by Billie Joe Armstrong from the band Green Day.

== Variations ==
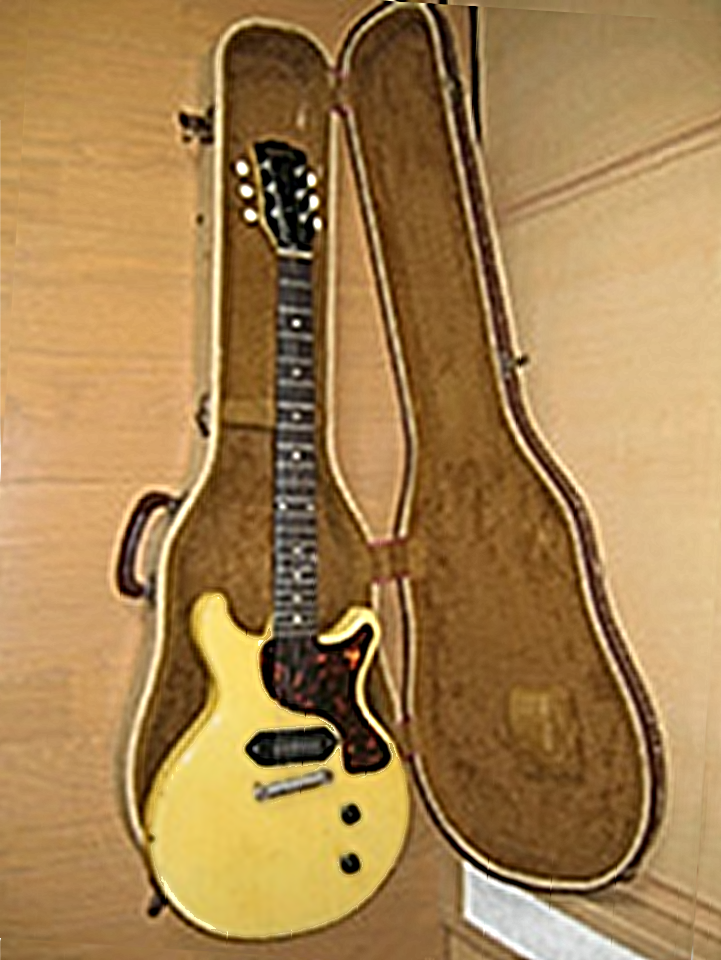
Gibson '59 Les Paul TV (reissued 1959 Junior DC in TV Yellow)

The Les Paul Junior was originally introduced in 1954 as a single-cutaway model, with its double-cutaway debuting in early 1958. The most common color schemes were vintage sunburst, cherry red, and TV yellow. In 2012, two rare black models with tortoiseshell pickguard, from 1959 and 1960, were described in Vintage Guitar; the possibility was offered that black models were special-ordered for a specific store, or that the black finish was used to cover up blemishes in the wood. In 1961, the body style of the Junior was shifted, and after conflict between Gibson and Les Paul, these models were renamed the "SG Junior".

The Les Paul Junior is still offered today in several U.S.-made versions that have been given modern touches, including a slimmer tapered neck. These have been seen in several different incarnations since the mid-1980s in both single- and double-cutaway. (see #Timeline) The Gibson Custom shop has also offered a period-correct Junior over the years through both its Historic and VOS branches. These models feature the more notorious large (or "baseball bat") neck.

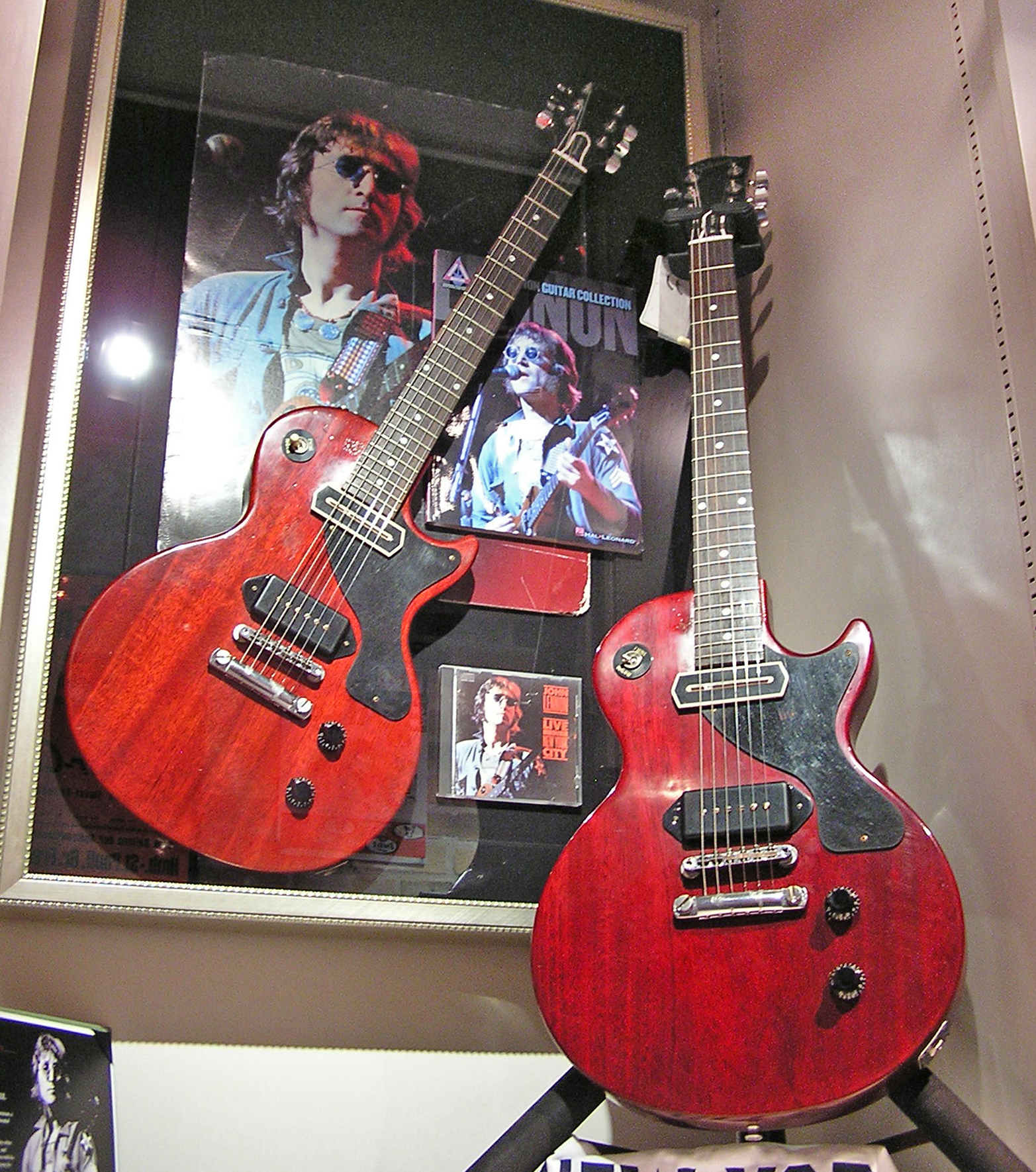
Gibson Custom Shop John Lennon Les Paul Junior, featuring a Charlie Christian pickup

Several artists have had Juniors produced in the Gibson product line, including John Lennon, Mick Jones, Peter Frampton, and the Bob Marley Les Paul Special. The Lennon model is unique for the single-coil, hexagon-shaped "Charlie Christian" pickup at the neck (which derived its name from the type installed on Christian's Gibson ES-150), a modification Lennon accepted when he had the guitar serviced upon acquiring it in the 1970s. Green Day's Billie Joe Armstrong and Gibson have released four signature Les Paul Juniors, the first is in three custom colors including Vintage Sunburst, Classic White, and Ebony, and is based on the actual '54-'57 Juniors. It also has some modern features requested by Armstrong, which include a slim tapered neck, as well as a specially designed "H-90" pickup which is said to be hum-canceling and it is overwound to handle more distortion. Armstrong's second signature model is a double-cutaway in TV Yellow which also includes an "H-90" pickup. However, according to Armstrong's guitar tech, he does not use the H-90 in his guitars. He uses a Seymour Duncan Antiquity P-90 pickup. The third signature is a single-cutaway released in 2018 in cherry, ebony, and sonic blue. The fourth, and as of 2023, most recent signature model is two structurally identical single-cutaway guitars; one in a "vintage ebony gloss" finish and the other in a "silver mist" finish, the second of which appearing in multiple music videos such as Oh Love and Stay the Night and being used in live performances throughout the 2010s and early 2020s.

The Les Paul Special has the same body shape, but is equipped with two P-90 pickups, and Gibson's standard four-knob, three-way switch electronics.

Ace Frehley and Gibson created a unique model of this guitar, The Gibson Les Paul Junior Lighter. It has a DiMarzio Super Distortion pickup as added by Frehley. It contained light bulbs incorporated into sequences that turned on as a marquee, but the lamps gave off too much heat and were reduced. They installed 20 cells for rechargeable ""C" batteries", new circuits, and new lamps.

Leslie West declined an offer to have a signature model of the instrument produced because he did not want a signature guitar based on an already-existing instrument, even though the Les Paul Junior was his main instrument during his heyday in Mountain.

In 2015, Gibson announced the re-release of the Gibson Les Paul Junior into their 2015 USA range. They decided to release a newer version of the Gibson Les Paul Junior in 2018 with vintage specifications including a '50 neck profile.

=== Epiphone Les Paul Junior ===
Epiphone, a major guitar company purchased by Gibson in 1957, sells lower-cost Juniors which feature a bolt-on neck configuration as well as being outfitted with a single humbucking pickup rather than the traditional P-90. Epiphone has released limited edition models including the Collegiate Edition and the Epiphone Limited Edition '57 Les Paul Junior Reissue with P-100, which features a set neck, all-solid mahogany construction, and a P-100 humbucker. Epiphone Japan has also released Juniors (with the Gibson headstock) including the LPJ-70 and the Ltd edition Lacquer Series Jr (both in vintage sunburst and cherry). These models were essentially true to the original 1954 Gibson specifications; however, they were only manufactured for the Japanese market and not for export.

=== Epiphone Invader ===
Epiphone manufactured the Invader as part of a starter pack which was marketed mostly in mainland Europe. In essence, the Invader is an identical guitar to the Epiphone Junior, with a single generic humbucker and single volume and tone pots. Invaders were manufactured by the Samick organisation in Indonesia but have now been discontinued in light of the success and production of the Junior.

Invaders are strictly budget-end instruments and as such tend to suffer from the not-unusual weakness of occasional poor tuning stability, but these instruments can still be regarded as useful and playable due to their light weight, versatility, and comfort.

As with the Junior, the Invader is the Epiphone version of the Gibson Junior and can also be seen as having links with the Gibson Melody Maker.

== Models ==
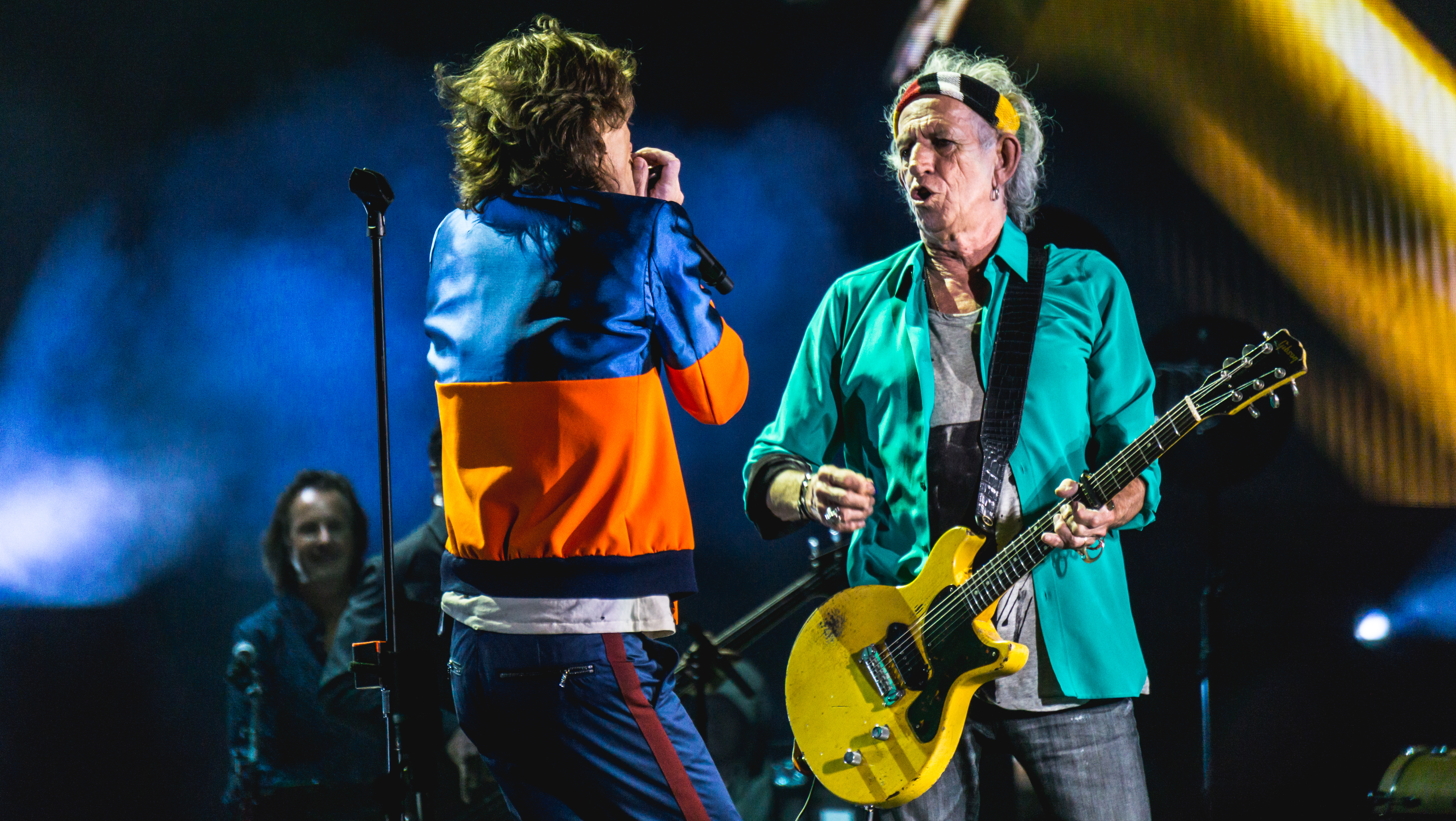
Keith Richards playing a double cutaway model with The Rolling Stones.

List of "Junior" models (original and reissue). For "Junior Special" models, Epiphone models, and Robot Guitar models, see Gibson Les Paul Special and #Variations, respectively.

=== Single cutaway ===
- 1954–1958: Les Paul Junior (Single Cutaway)
- 1956–1958: Les Paul Junior 3/4 (Single Cutaway)
- 1954–1958: Les Paul TV (Single Cutaway)

reissues

- 1986–1992: Les Paul Junior (Single Cutaway Reissue)
- 2001–2002: Les Paul Junior (LPJ-)
- 2019–Pres: Les Paul Junior (Original Collection)

variations

- 2008–2012: Les Paul Junior Faded (LPJ)
- 2011–2012: Les Paul Junior 2011 (Model LPJ)
- 2015: Les Paul Junior 2015 (LPJR15)
- 2018: Les Paul Junior 2018
- 2018: Les Paul Junior 2018 Billie Joe Armstrong Signature (Humbucker loaded)
- 2020: Les Paul Junior 2020 Lukas Nelson '56 Limited Edition
- 2024: Les Paul Junior 2024 Charlie Starr Limited Edition

=== Double cutaway ===
- 1958–1961: Les Paul Junior (Double Cutaway)
- 1958–1959: Les Paul TV (Double Cutaway)
- (1961–1963: Les Paul Junior (SG-style))

reissues

- 1987–1989, 1995–1996:
  Les Paul Junior (Double Cutaway Reissue)

variations

- 1990–1992: Les Paul Junior Hall of Fame Series (Double Cutaway Reissue, with P-100 humbuckers)

== See also ==
- List of Gibson players
- Gibson Melody Maker (1959–1971) – an entry-level guitar model similar to Les Paul Junior but with thinner body
- Gibson SG Junior (1961–1971, 2011–present) – successor of Les Paul Junior with SG shape
- Gibson Spirit (1982–1986) – a guitar model similar to Les Paul Junior DC but with cutaway at 20th fret
