= PRS Guitars =

American guitar and amplifier manufacturer

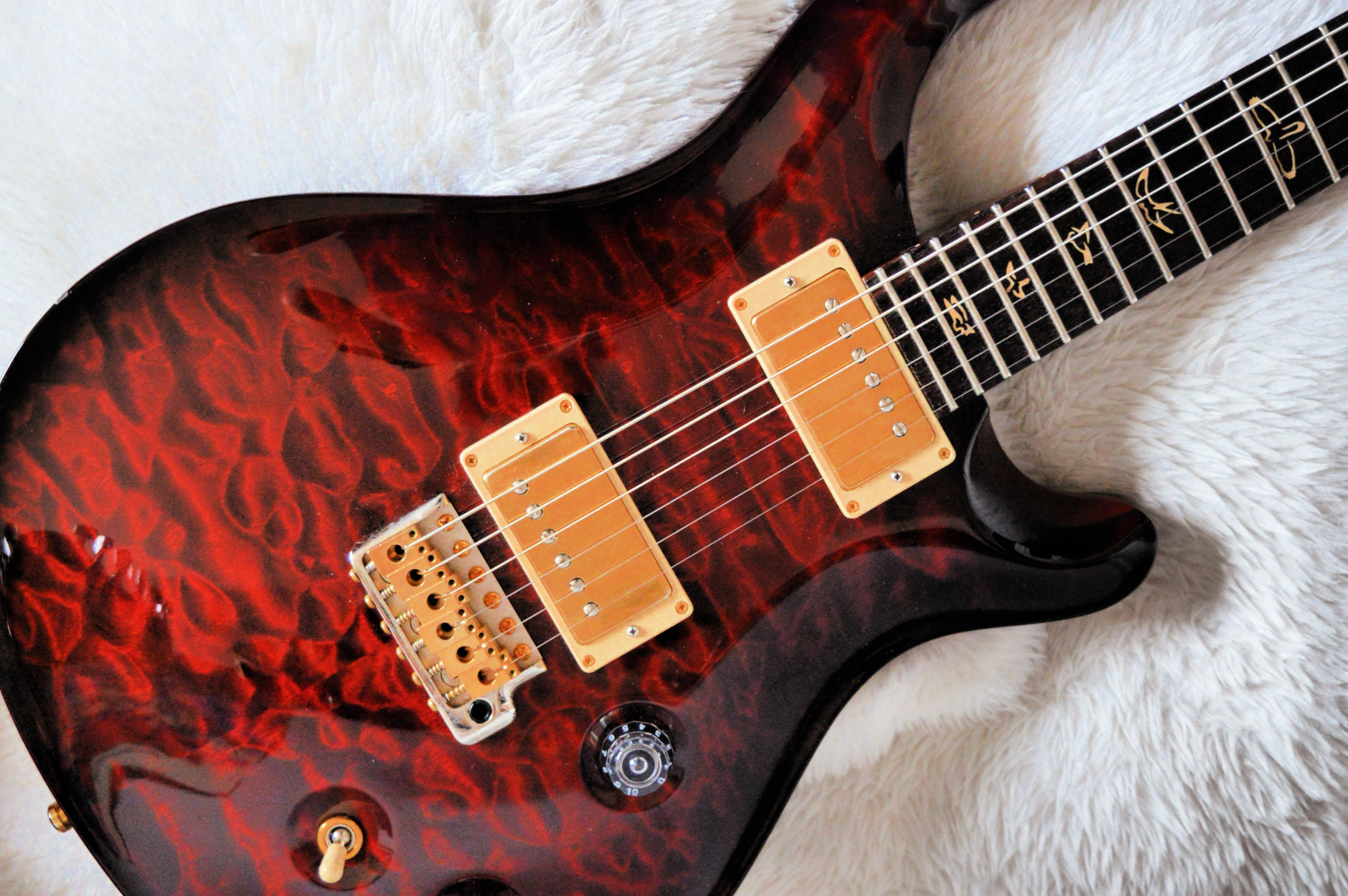
- A PRS McCarty with a quilt maple top
- Type: Private
- Industry: Musical instruments
- Founded: 1985; 41 years ago
- Founder: Paul Reed Smith
- Headquarters: Stevensville, Maryland, United States
- Area served: Worldwide
- Products: Electric and acoustic guitars, basses (formerly), amplifiers, effects pedals
- Website: prsguitars.com

Paul Reed Smith Guitars, also known as PRS Guitars or simply PRS, is an American electric guitar manufacturer founded by Paul Reed Smith in 1985 in Annapolis, Maryland. After dropping out of college, Smith began making guitars by hand and found early customers like Peter Frampton and Carlos Santana. Smith achieved wider success with his namesake company's first production model, the Custom, and the ornate Dragon series. PRS has continued to expand its product line with models like the vintage-inspired McCarty, affordable SE range, and signature models for players including Santana, Mark Tremonti, and John Mayer. PRS also produces acoustic guitars, effects pedals, and amplifiers. By 2024, PRS had become the third best-selling guitar brand behind Fender and Gibson. The company is currently based in Stevensville, Maryland.

== History ==
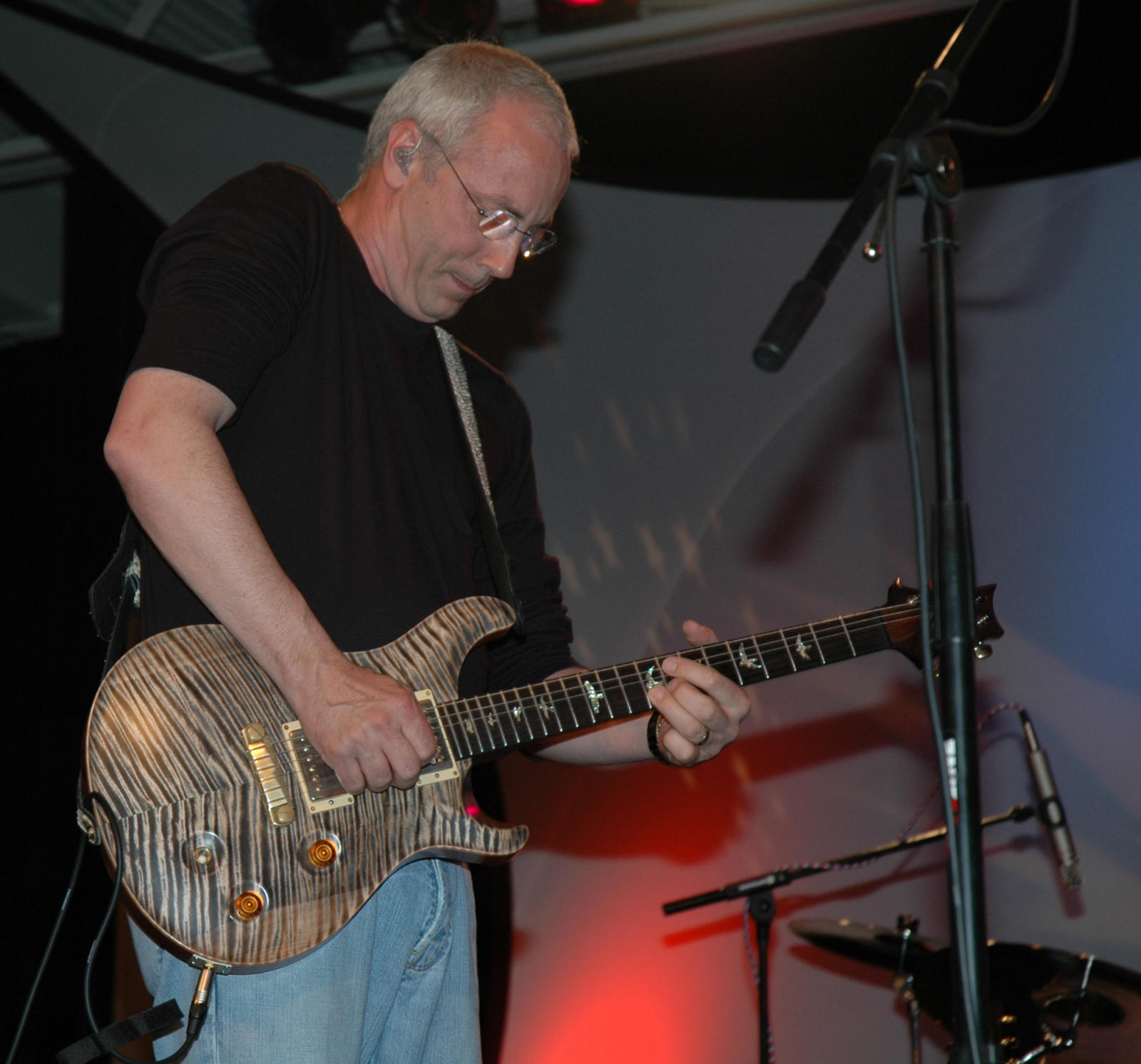
Founder Paul Reed Smith

=== Pre-factory era ===
Paul Reed Smith (born February 18, 1956) built his first stringed instrument, an electric bass, in 1972 while a student at Bowie High School. After graduating, Smith briefly attended St. Mary's College of Maryland, where he completed his first electric guitar at the age of 19. The college awarded Smith four credits for the guitar, which was deemed "of professional quality." Smith dropped out of college to open his own repair and luthier shop in Annapolis, from which he and several employees built on average one guitar per month. In 1976, Smith built a custom guitar for Peter Frampton and took it to several concerts, where he knocked on backstage doors to try and show it to guitarists. Ted Nugent bought an early guitar from Smith. Al Dimeola ordered a 12-string model. Howard Leese bought Smith's first maple-topped guitar, the Golden Eagle. Carlos Santana requested a guitar similar to Leese's, and it was delivered in 1980.

By the end of 1984, Smith had refined his initial designs, creating his brand's upcoming signature design elements, including its Strat-meets-Les Paul body shape, headstock design, birds-in-flight fretboard inlays, and dual humbuckers with rotary, five-way pickup switching. Smith debuted his new guitar model, the "Custom," at the 1985 NAMM Show, and afterwards traveled to retailers along the East Coast, collecting enough preorders to open his own Annapolis factory that same year.

=== Breakthrough ===
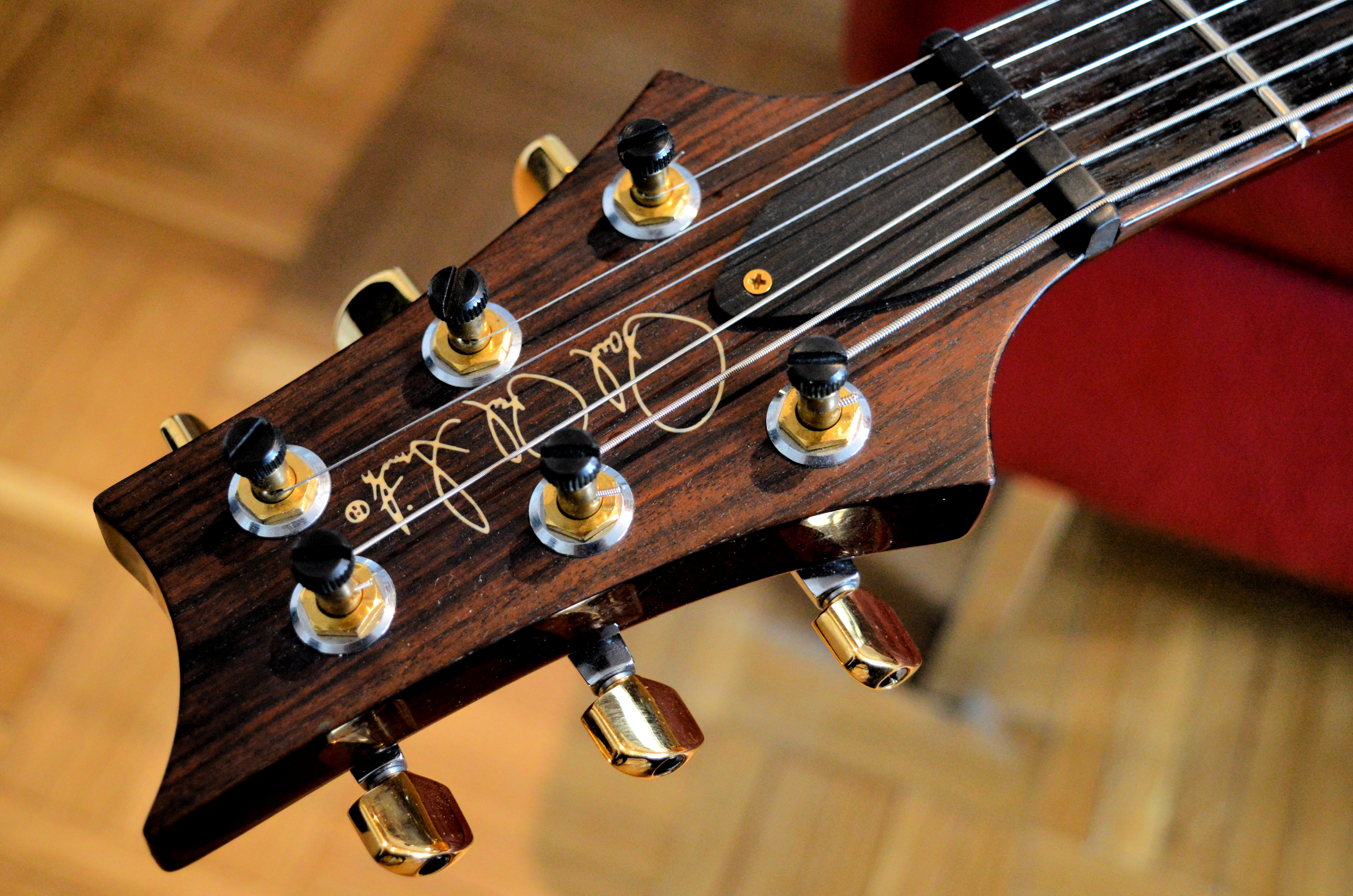
PRS's primary headstock style

PRS's first factory production models were the Custom and its all-mahogany variant, the "PRS Guitar." In June 1986, the brand celebrated its 1,000th guitar. The PRS Guitar was renamed the "Standard" the following year. With demand surging, a friend of Smith's suggested that he was not charging enough for his instruments; Smith responded by introducing a "Signature" series, produced from 1987 until 1991. The Signature line proved successful, but the increased price facilitated a negative response among critics for building guitars only afforded by "doctors and dentists."

In 1988, PRS introduced a more affordable option, their "CE" (Classic Electric) models, which were characterized by bolt-on necks, alder bodies, and maple necks, similar to Fender guitars. The CEs were originally produced until 2009, and then reintroduced in 2016. These were followed in 1990 with the even more affordable, 22-fret "EG" (Electric Guitar) models and the more successful "EG II" of 1992, which included PRS's first left-handed offering. PRS introduced the "Dragon 1" model in 1992, with only 50 units made and an $8,000 price tag. It featured an intricate dragon inlay which ran down the fretboard, a wide 22-fret neck, a non-vibrato stop-tail bridge, and a new pickup design. The changes from previous models added a noticeable tonal improvement, which led the company to create a mass production model in 1993, the Custom 22. PRS then launched the "McCarty" model in 1994, offering a more vintage-feeling and sounding PRS guitar in honor of former Gibson president Ted McCarty, who had become a friend and mentor to Smith. The following year, PRS began producing a signature model for Santana, who became the brand's first formal endorser. In 1996, the company moved to its present facility in Stevensville on Kent Island, launched its website, and opened its "Private Stock" custom-build service.

=== Expansion ===
For decades, PRS's entire guitar production occurred in the company's Maryland (United States) factories. In 2000, the company introduced the "SE" (Student Edition) line of instruments. These instruments, imported from Asia, offered lower priced versions based on many PRS popular models. SE models were originally manufactured in Korea by World Musical Instrument Co. Ltd., but since 2019 production has been moved to Cor-Tek factories in Indonesia and China. In 2008, PRS expanded its catalog to include acoustic guitars. Two years later, despite the economic downturn, PRS released 20 new models, 13 of which were anniversary editions, alongside new models like a singlecut McCarty and SE versions of the Singlecut and Santana models. With the S2 range introduced in 2014, PRS began offering less expensive, American-made versions of their guitars. The S2 range launched with an S2 version of the Custom 24 and two new models, the Starla and Mira.

A PRS SE50 amplifier head

In 2007, PRS began offering amplifiers with its Archon model and subsequently added to its lineup signature models for Mark Tremonti (MT series) and David Grissom (DG Custom 30). PRS also produces the HDRX series, an amp series based originally on a Marshall Super Lead used by Jimi Hendrix and housed at the Museum of Pop Culture in Seattle, Washington.

PRS offers multiple signature model guitars and amplifiers, most notably designing the Silver Sky with John Mayer. The Silver Sky and overall SE product series were included in Guitar World's 2025 list of the 50 greatest pieces of guitar gear of the century so far. Other signature models include the Fiore for Mark Lettieri and the Chleo for Herman Li, which both use the same longer 25.5" scale of the Silver Sky. The Studio Standard and NF3 models share the pickguard harness construction method used for the Silver Sky, but adhere to PRS's typical 25-inch scale length. In 2023, PRS released two Telecaster-style singlecut models, the NF 53 and Miles Kennedy signature model.

In 2026, PRS entered the heavy metal guitar market with its Tekton series. Tekton models feature bodies with more pronounced contouring and thinner necks and flatter fretboards than any other PRS guitar model. Options include Floyd Rose tremolos and a seven-string model. Tekton models also include unique humbucker pickups designed to produce a flatter output to pair better with digital modelers.

== Construction ==
=== 10 Top ===
As PRS's profile grew, the brand started getting individual requests for guitars with the most attractive figured maple tops they had available. Smith was unwilling to part with them without charging extra, however, and began designating woods with deep, consistent figuring as "10 Tops" and selling guitars made with them at a higher price point. Tops with particularly deep figuring—even by 10 Top standards—are designated for premium Artist Package and Private Stock models. How PRS rates these maple tops can change during the course of manufacturing, with tops upgraded or downgraded depending on how the figuring changes after being carved or stained. Although purely aesthetic, 10 Top models are among PRS's most sought after.

=== Fretboard inlays ===
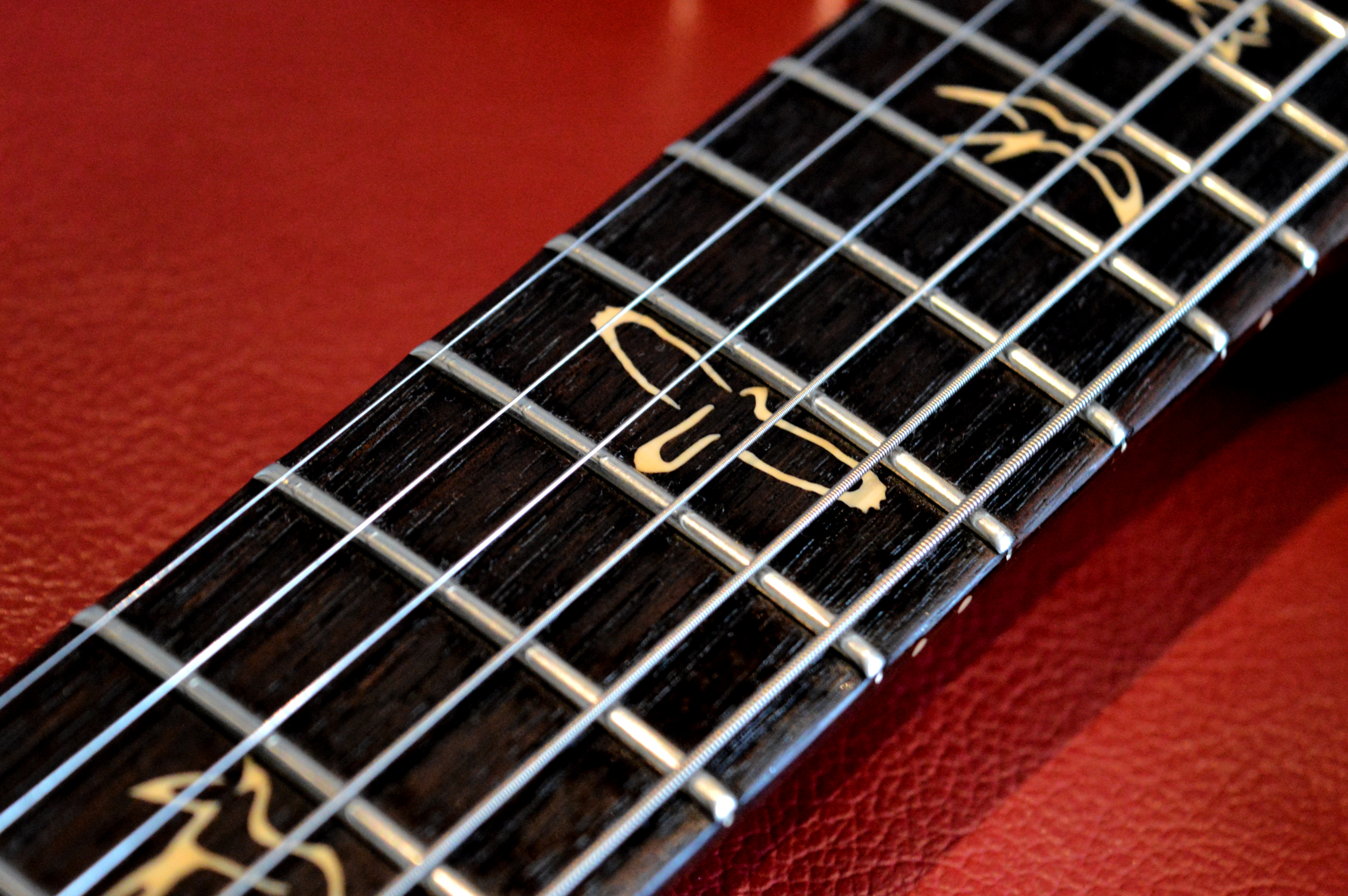

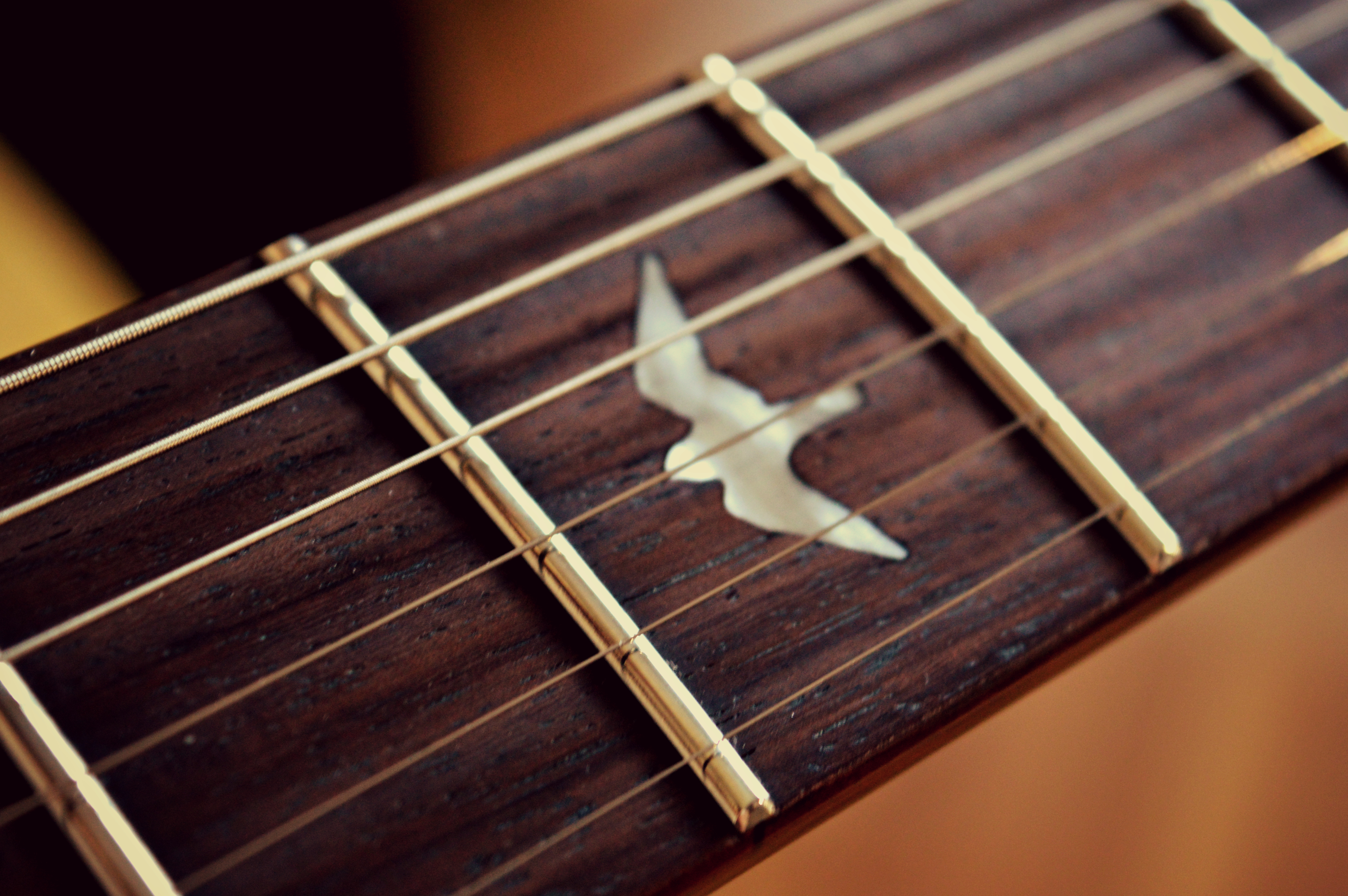
Examples of PRS's signature birds-in-flight fretboard inlays

One of PRS's signature design elements are its birds-in-flight fretboard inlays. Smith first used bird inlays in a guitar he built for Peter Frampton in 1976, prior to PRS's official launch. Smith credited his mother's love of bird watching for the choice, with most of the designs inspired by a bird book he purchased for the task. He has stated the birds featured in the smaller upper frets were the most difficult to design, and several friends helped with their depiction. The birds shown are a peregrine falcon, northern harrier, ruby-throated hummingbird, common tern, Cooper's hawk, kite, sparrow (landing), storm petrel, and hawk (landing). Twenty-four-fret models additionally have a perched screech owl as the final inlay, although some fans refer to it as a "flying turtle."

Originally, the birds-in-flight inlays were offered as an option alongside what was expected to be the more popular dot, or "moon", inlays, but guitars with the bird inlays were met with much higher demand and PRS made them standard. The birds-in-flight inlays have since undergone several revisions, with the original solid birds joined by hollow versions, as well as more artistic depictions. Some custom and limited edition models depart from PRS's bird theme. The Dragon models, for example, feature elaborate dragon-themed inlays that cover much of the fretboard. Signature models can also use different designs, like the Private Stock Orianthi Limited Edition's "Lotus Vine" inlay, which is similar to a tree of life inlay design the brand has used.

=== Hardware ===
Nuts are synthetic and tuners are of PRS's own design, although some models feature Korean-made Kluson-style tuners. PRS guitars feature three original bridge designs: a one-piece pre-intonated stoptail, a vibrato, and a wrapover tailpiece. The vibrato was designed with the help of guitar engineer John Mann. It was an update on the classic Fender vibrato and used cam-locking tuners, which offered wide pitch bending with exceptional tuning stability.

=== Pickups ===
Pickups are designed and wound in-house. While most of the brand's pickups are humbuckers, some are a pair of single coils wound in opposing directions, one intended for the neck and one for the bridge position. Through the use of a unique rotary pickup selector switch, PRS pickups offer five different sounds: a combination of thick humbucking Gibson-like tones, and chimey single-coil Stratocaster-like tones. The standard treble and standard bass pickups use magnetic pole pieces in the non-adjustable inner coil, and a rear-placed feeder magnet in order to achieve a more authentic single-coil tone when split by the rotary switch.

PRS developed pickups for the aggressive rock market, offering pickups such as the chainsaw, and the Hot-Fat-Screams (HFS) initially used on the Special model.

In 1998, an electronic upgrade kit was released for pre-1993 instruments which included lighter-weight tuner buttons, nickel-plated brass screws for saddles and intonation, a simulated tone control, and high-capacitance hookup wire. In 2012, PRS released the 408 pickups used on the 408 and Paul's Guitar models. These pickups include innovations that feature no loss of volume when in coil split mode. They have an exclusive agreement to use wire drawn from the same machine that made wire for Les Paul and Stratocaster pickups in the 1950s.

Certain models of PRS guitars have also used pickups by Lindy Fralin, notably in the EG II and certain specs of the Custom 22.

== Product series ==
PRS offers many of its models in different product series, each varying in price, quality, and location of manufacture. They are organized below by price range, from low to high.

- SE / Student Edition: Created out of demand for affordable versions of the brand's Core models. SE models were originally made in Korea, but production was later moved to Indonesia and China. Compared to other series, SE models reduce production costs in several ways, such as using maple veneers (instead of maple tops) and multi-ply maple necks. They also employ a "Wide Thin" neck profile as opposed to the more popular "Pattern Thin" profile of more expensive models.
- S2: The brand's mid-priced offerings, constructed in the Stevensville factory alongside the Core models, albeit using a faster production line and a combination of US-made and foreign parts. S2 models have a stripped-down aesthetic compared to most Core models and feature some design changes, like using asymmetrically beveled tops. This line contains both "reimagined" versions of existing models and new designs.
- Bolt-On: Made in the brand's Maryland factory, these models are characterized by their bolt-on neck construction and include several models with single-coil pickups, like the Silver Sky. All CE models have bolt-on necks.
- Core: PRS's standard, American-made production models. The Core series comprises all of the brand's early designs and features the brand's highest build quality short of Private Stock guitars.
- Private Stock: Private Stock is a custom-build service and represent PRS's highest-end guitars.

== Notable models ==
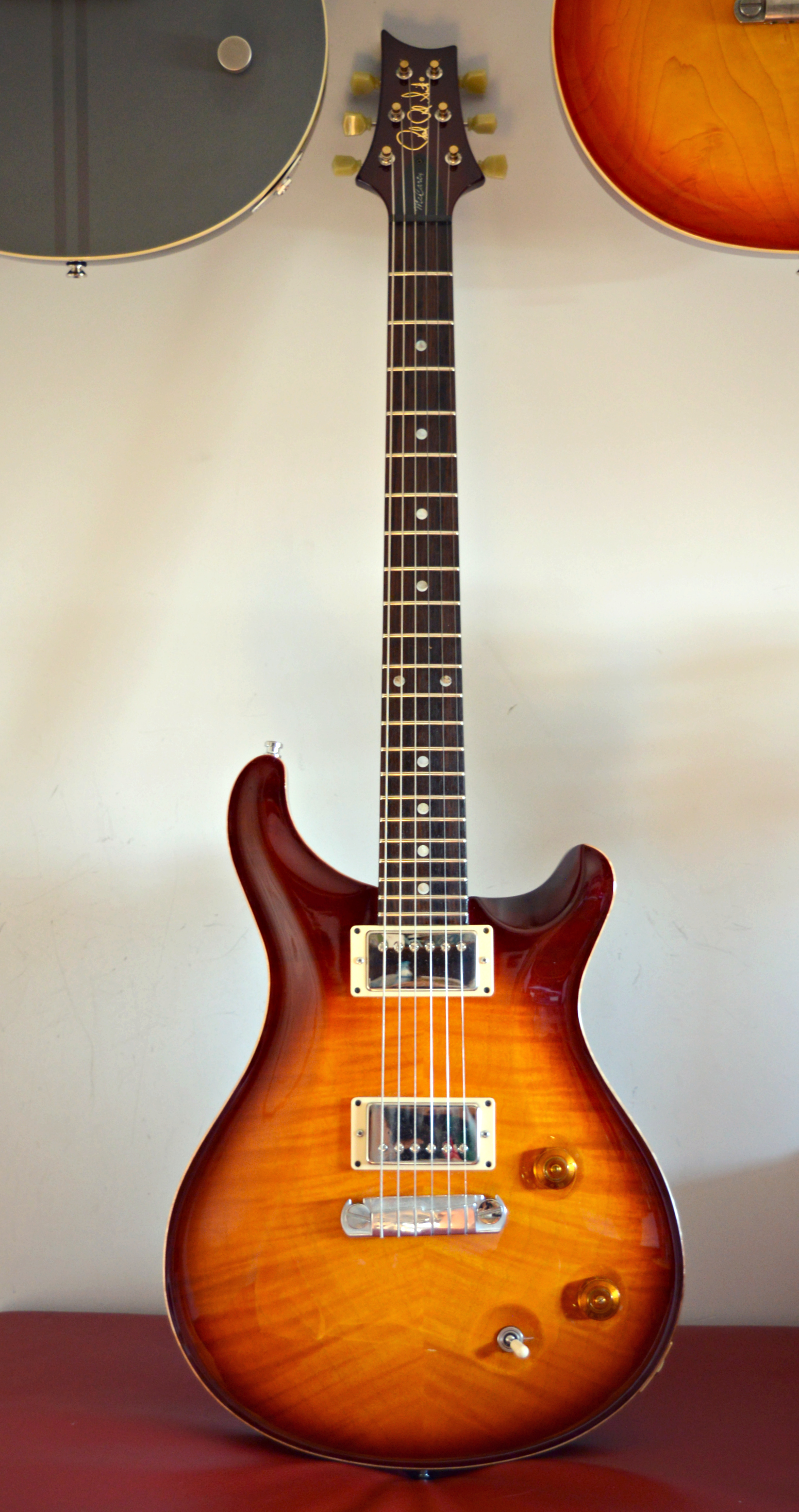
McCarty with a stopbar bridge

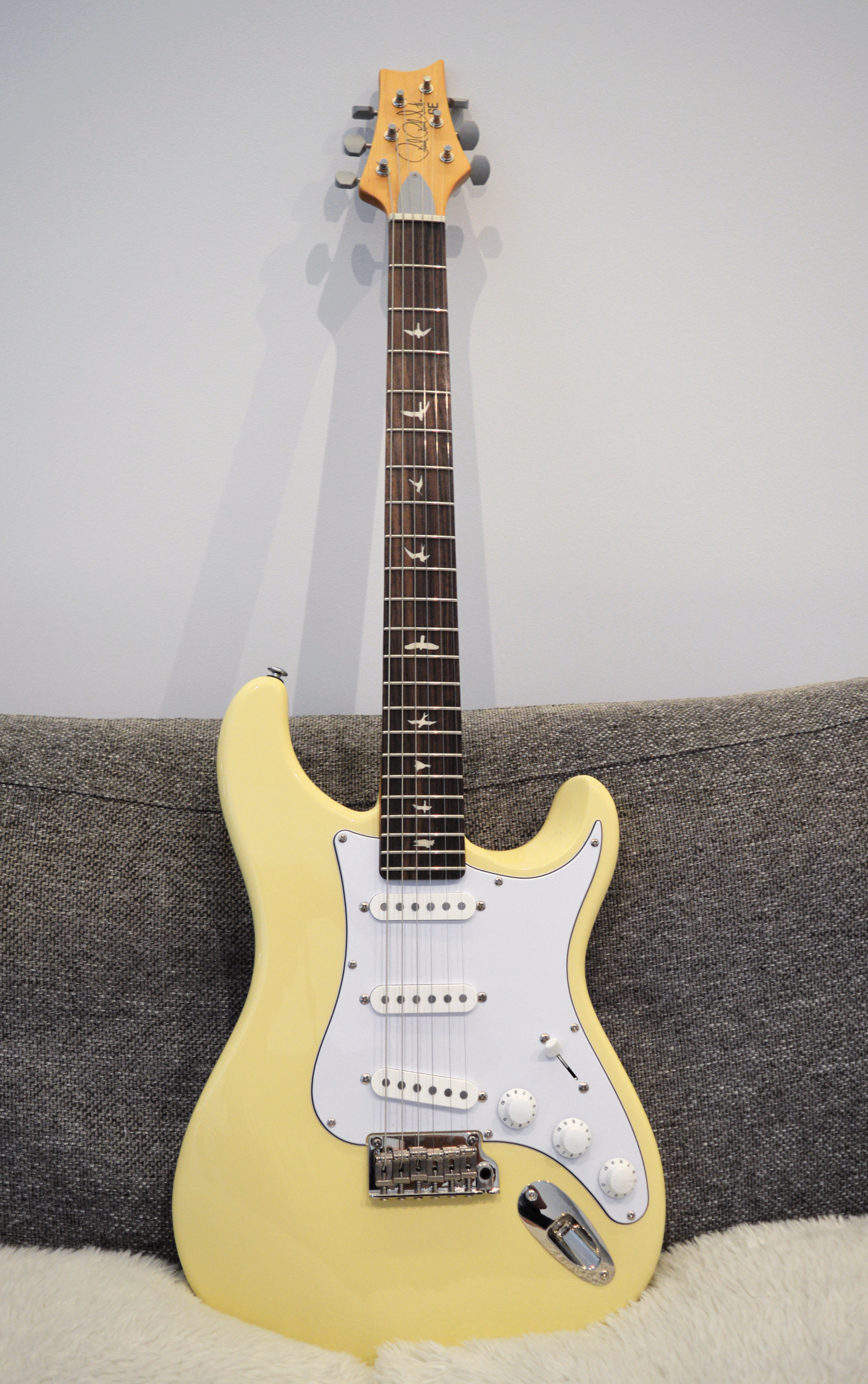
Silver Sky

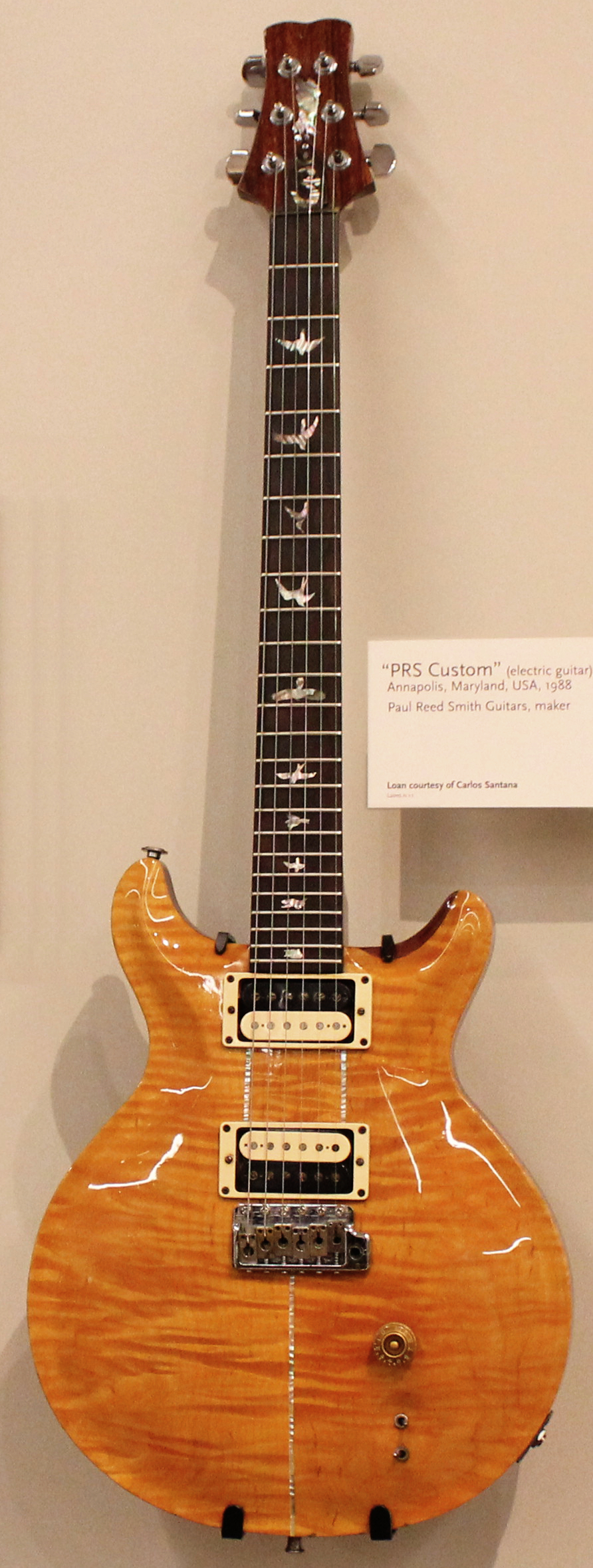
Santana signature model

=== Golden Eagle ===
Paul Reed Smith built his first maple-topped guitar, dubbed the Golden Eagle, using wood from a 300-year-old dresser Smith acquired from a friend's mother. The "pre-factory" design was similar to a double cutaway Les Paul Junior, with a rounder lower bout and a shorter bass-side horn compared to PRS's later Custom-style silhouette, but used two humbuckers, a carved maple top, and vibrato bridge. The Golden Eagle had a yellow/amber finish, abalone purfling strips, darker mahogany neck, mother-of-pearl eagle on the headstock, and 24.5" scale length. The customer it was built for, however, declined to follow through on the purchase and it was instead sold to Heart's Howard Leese, who bought the guitar based entirely on a photo Smith sent him. Much of the Golden Eagle's design was later replicated for Carlos Santana's own signature models. Leese also purchased Smith's maple-topped follow-up, the Golden Eagle #2, which featured only a bridge pickup.

=== Santana ===
While Santana first played a PRS guitar in 1976 when Smith was showing his guitars backstage at concerts, he first extensively used one when he borrowed Leese's Golden Eagle #2 to record his album Zebop!. In 1980, Smith brought another prototype to Santana backstage at a concert and an impressed Santana commissioned his own maple-topped model, which was Smith's third after Leese's Golden Eagles. The guitar was completed in 30 days and delivered that November. It followed much of the original Golden Eagle's format, with alterations like an Om symbol on the truss rod cover, a single knob (for volume), and on/off mini-toggles for each pickup. The guitar established a lasting relationship between Santana and Smith, giving the fledgling PRS brand credibility and serving as the template for future signature models for Santana, which PRS began making in 1995. Multiple iterations have since been released, including the Santana II, which was used to record Supernatural, and the first SE model, as the SE series was inspired by numerous requests from players for an affordable Santana signature guitar.

=== Custom ===
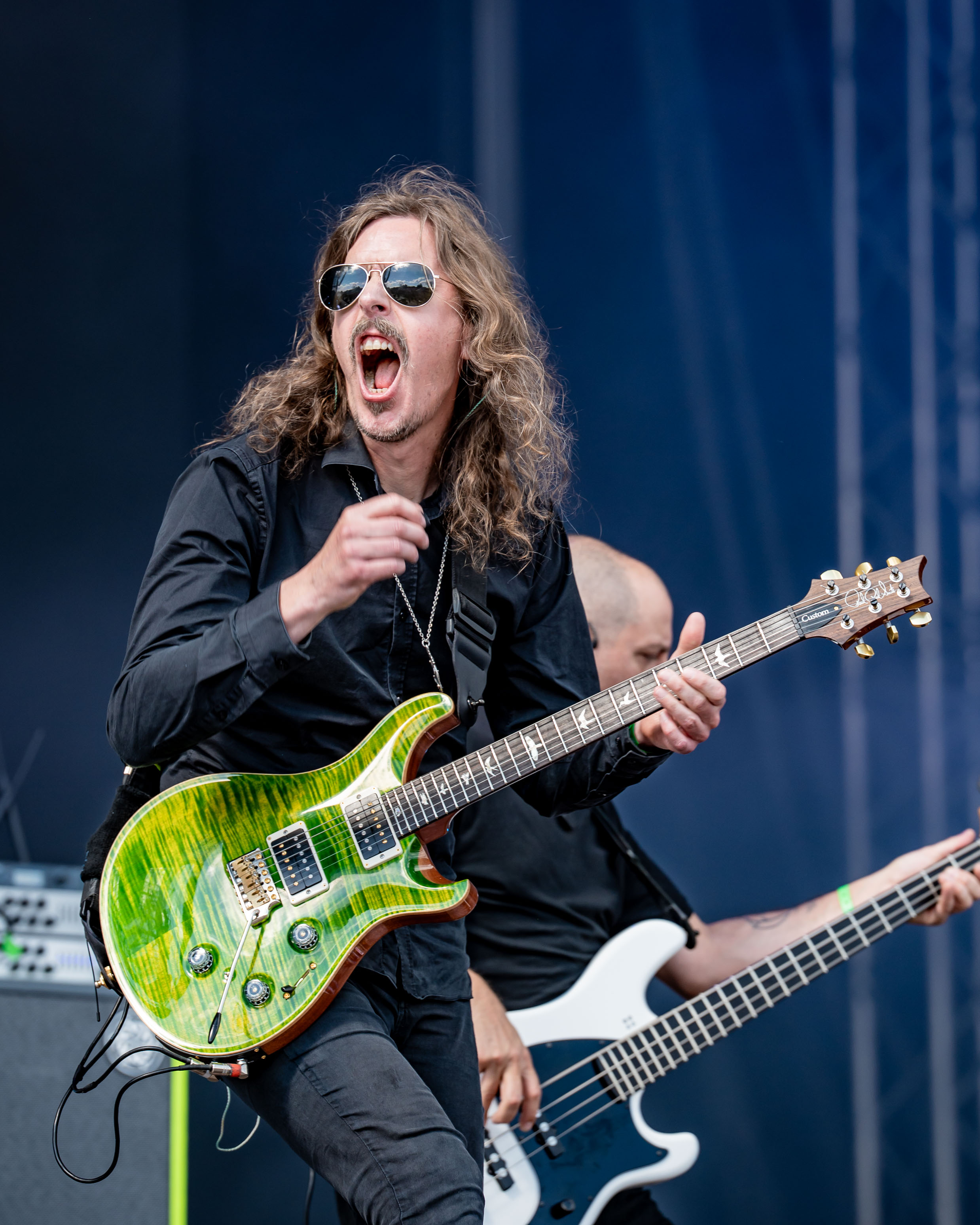
Mikael Akerfeldt of Opeth playing a Custom 24

The 24-fret Custom was the brand's first production model, released in 1985, and introduced many of what would become the brand's signature design elements, including a body shape that merged elements of the Fender Stratocaster and Gibson Les Paul, along with a 25" scale length that similarly sits in between Fender and Gibson specs. Other features included a revised headstock design that became standard for the brand, a PRS-patented tremolo, a "sweet switch" tone filter toggle, and a unique, five-position rotary pickup selector that switched between full humbucker and split-coil configurations. A "stoptail" bridge option was offered from 1993 on, while the rotary selector was replaced with a five-way blade switch in 2011. In a retrospective, Guitar World credited the Custom's success during the height of the superstrat's popularity as owing to many players looking for a guitar with a vintage aesthetic and tone but with modern, upscale features. The Custom was renamed the "Custom 24" after the introduction of the Custom 22, a production model of the Dragon 1 that removed the dragon inlay. Like with many future PRS models, both Customs would see iterations that introduced new features such as piezo and soapbar pickups and Floyd Rose locking bridges.

=== Dragon ===
Following the success of the Custom, PRS introduced in 1992 the ornate "Dragon 1" model, which was characterized by an intricate dragon inlay that covered the length of the fretboard. With only 50 units made and an $8,000 price tag, the Dragon was a "love it or hate it" design aimed at collectors rather than players. The Dragon was the first PRS model to feature a 22-fret neck and the brand's "Wide Fat" neck profile; it also introduced their "Stoptail" one-piece wrap-over bridge design, new covered humbucker Dragon treble and bass pickups, and steeper headstock back-angle. These changes from the Custom made a noticeable tonal improvement, which led the company to create a mass production model in 1993, the Custom 22, without the dragon inlays. The Dragon 2 was released in 1993, and the Dragon 3 in 1994. Both featured dragon inlays that became more complex with each edition. Only 100 of each of the two models were made. In 1999, PRS released the Dragon 2000, which featured complex body curves, and a three-dimensional dragon inlay. Just 50 Dragon 2000's were ever produced. In 1996, the Smithsonian National Museum of American History included the Dragon 1 with other well-known guitars as a piece of history regarding American popular music. PRS has celebrated many of its anniversaries with new Dragon models, including a 2005 20th anniversary edition with a double neck and their latest, a 40th anniversary model released in 2025, the latter being the 10th in the series.

=== McCarty ===
Early in his career, Smith had befriended former Gibson president Ted McCarty, who became a mentor to him. Although McCarty was not involved in the model's design, PRS named it in his honor, with Smith explaining that the design represented the culmination of everything McCarty had taught him. The McCarty departed from the typical PRS design in multiple ways, featuring a slightly deeper body, thinner headstock, and a three-way toggle for pickup selection. PRS later added a push-pull switch for coil-splitting. Some of the McCarty's features came at the suggestion of David Grissom.

=== Singlecut ===
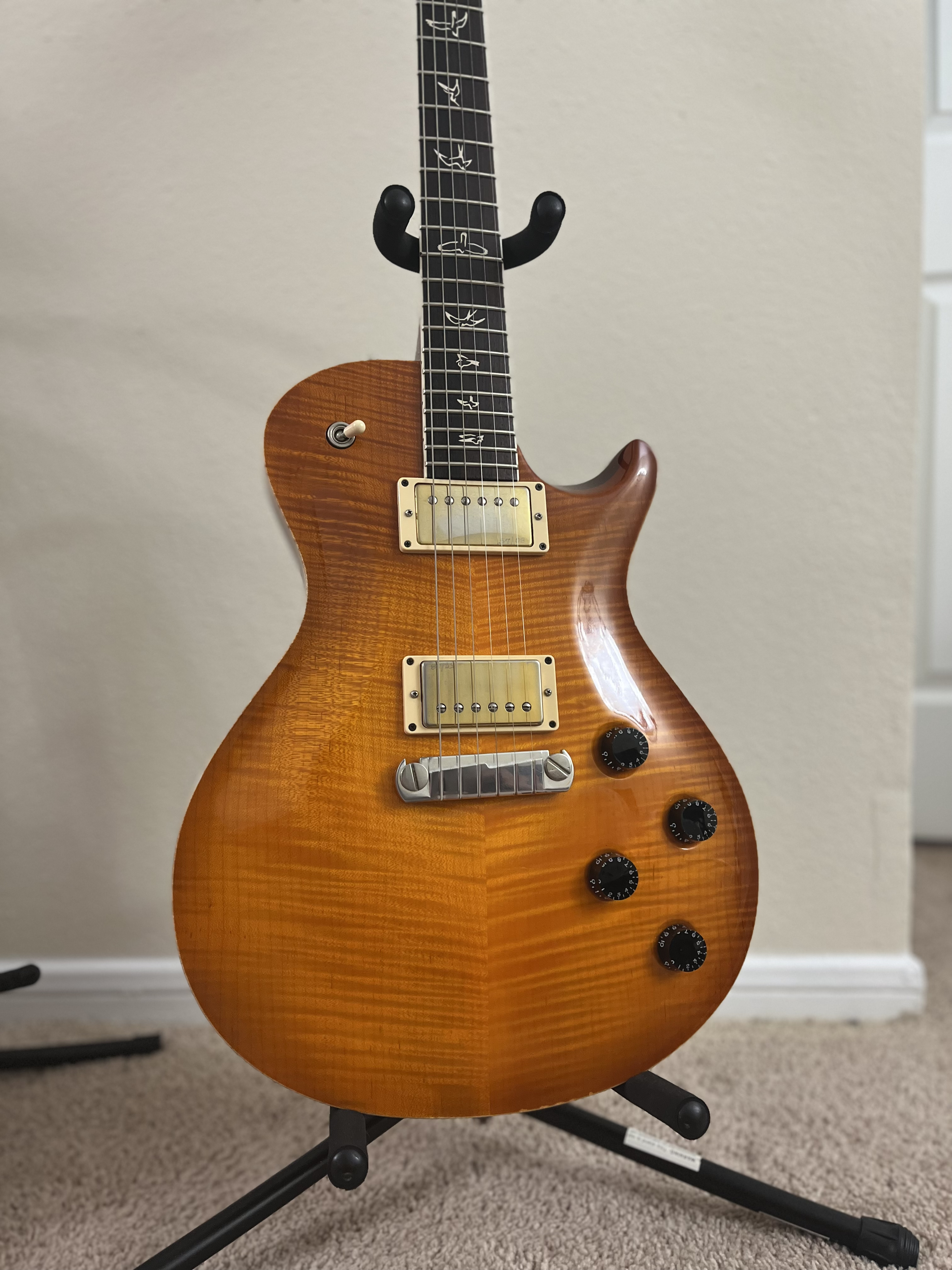
A PRS Singlecut, the model at issue in Gibson's trademark dispute

In 2000, PRS debuted their Singlecut model, which notably bore a strong resemblance to Gibson's Les Paul. Although other brands producing Les Paul-inspired guitars was not uncommon, PRS's strong market position made the Singlecut a more direct "threat" to Gibson. As a result, Gibson filed a trademark infringement lawsuit, while PRS countered that it had not violated any valid Gibson trademarks. The case was of significant interest to the guitar-making industry, as it potentially had serious ramifications for any brand making single-cutaway, solidbody guitar models. An injunction was ordered in 2004 that required PRS to stop manufacturing the Singlecut, with a Federal District Court judge ruling that the Singlecut was an imitation of the Les Paul. However, in 2005, the United States Court of Appeals for the Sixth Circuit reversed this lower court decision and ordered the dismissal of Gibson's suit. PRS resumed production. While no changes to the design of the Singlecut occurred as a result of the lawsuit, some Singlecut owners and sellers have adopted the term "pre-lawsuit" to differentiate their Singlecut guitar from others.

=== Silver Sky ===
The PRS Silver Sky was co-designed with John Mayer as his signature model with the brand. The Silver Sky's basic design combines a Fender Stratocaster-style body with PRS's headstock and signature birds-in-flight fretboard inlays. Mayer had previously been an endorser of Fender guitars with his own signature model Stratocaster, but Mayer ended the partnership in 2014 to pursue new guitar designs with Paul Reed Smith. Upon release, the Silver Sky quickly became one of the industry's best-selling guitar, while simultaneously facing backlash among many guitarists over its similarities to the Strat—a combination that led Guitar World to dub the Silver Sky a "phenomenon... the guitar that 'broke' the internet."

== Artists ==
Italics denote the player has a PRS signature model.

- Mikael Akerfeldt of Opeth
- Emil Werstler
- Martin Barre of Jethro Tull
- Dickey Betts of the Allman Brothers Band
- Wes Borland of Limp Bizkit
- Dave Knudson of Minus the Bear
- Brad Delson of Linkin Park
- Al Di Meola
- Ryan Knight of the Black Dahlia Murder
- Mike Einziger of Incubus
- Dan Estrin of Hoobastank
- Peter Frampton
- David Grissom
- Chris Haskett of Rollins Band
- Warren Haynes
- Chris Henderson of 3 Doors Down
- Mark Holcomb of Periphery
- Paul Jackson Jr.
- Myles Kennedy of Alter Bridge
- Gustavo Cerati of Soda Stereo
- Larry LaLonde of Primus
- Mark Lettieri
- Herman Li of DragonForce
- Alex Lifeson of Rush
- Clint Lowery of Sevendust
- Tim Mahoney of 311
- Brent Mason
- John Mayer
- John McLaughlin
- Gary Moore
- Mike Mushok of Staind
- Zach Myers of Shinedown
- Dave Navarro of Jane's Addiction
- Ted Nugent
- Mike Oldfield
- Orianthi
- Jimmy Page
- Jim Root of Slipknot
- Carlos Santana
- Ed Sheeran
- Neal Schon of Journey
- Phil Sgrosso of As I Lay Dying
- Martin Simpson
- Kanami Tōno of Band-Maid
- Pat Travers
- Mark Tremonti of Creed
- Ahmad Dhani and Andra Ramadhan of Dewa 19
- Dany Villarreal of the Warning
- Dustie Waring
