= Cutaway (guitar) =

Indentation on the guitar body

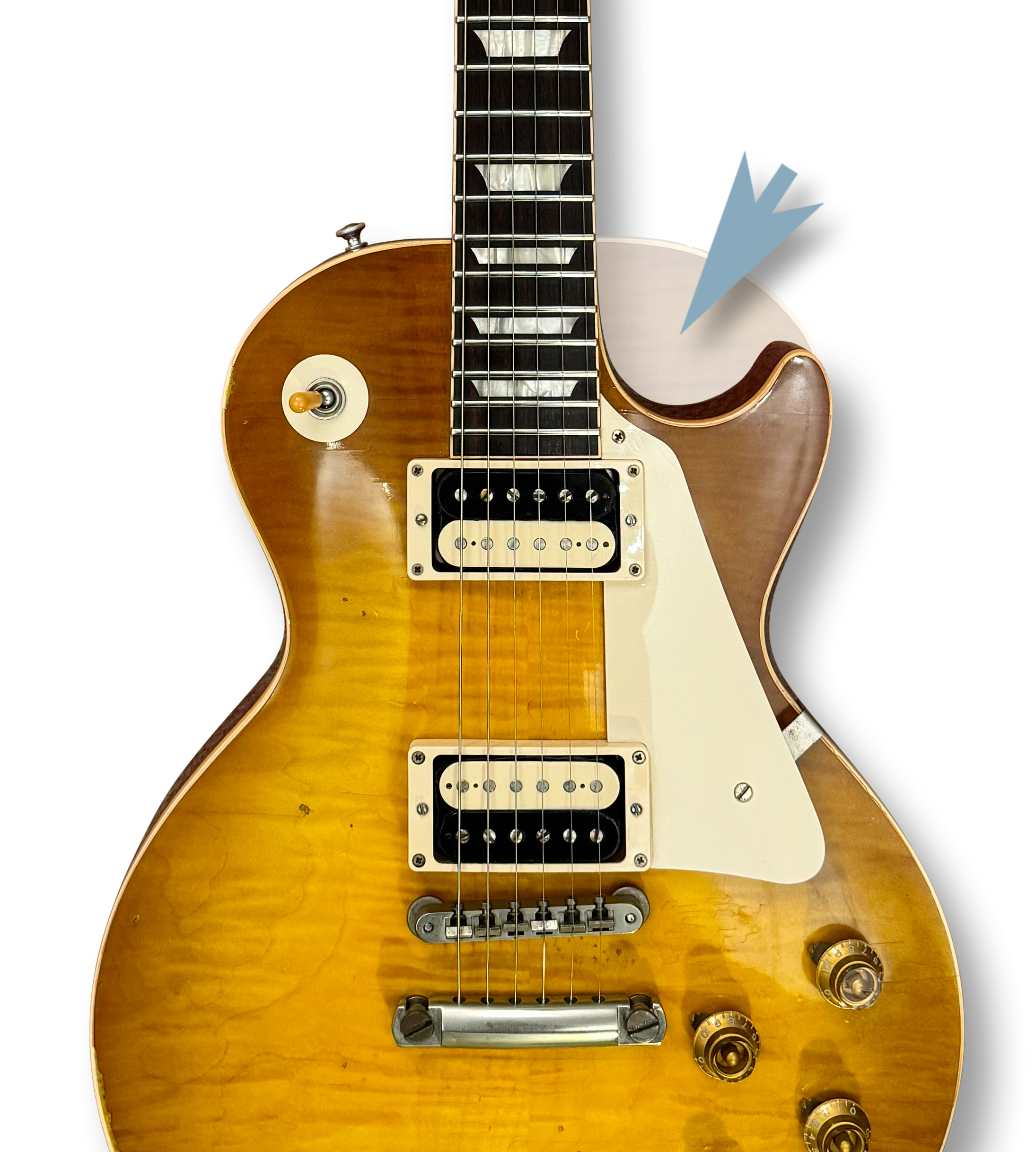
Cutaway on a Gibson Les Paul guitar.

A cutaway on the guitar construction is an indentation in the upper bout of the guitar body adjacent to the guitar neck, designed to allow easier access to the upper frets.

== Overview ==
Cutaway bodies are mainly of interest when discussing acoustic guitars and semi-acoustic guitars; virtually all solid body guitars either have at least one cutaway, or have a body shape (such as the flying V guitar) which does not intrude into the upper neck area.

Some manufacturers denote instrument models with cutaway using the suffix C, such as the Gibson L5C or the Maton CW80C.

== Types ==
Single cutaway types

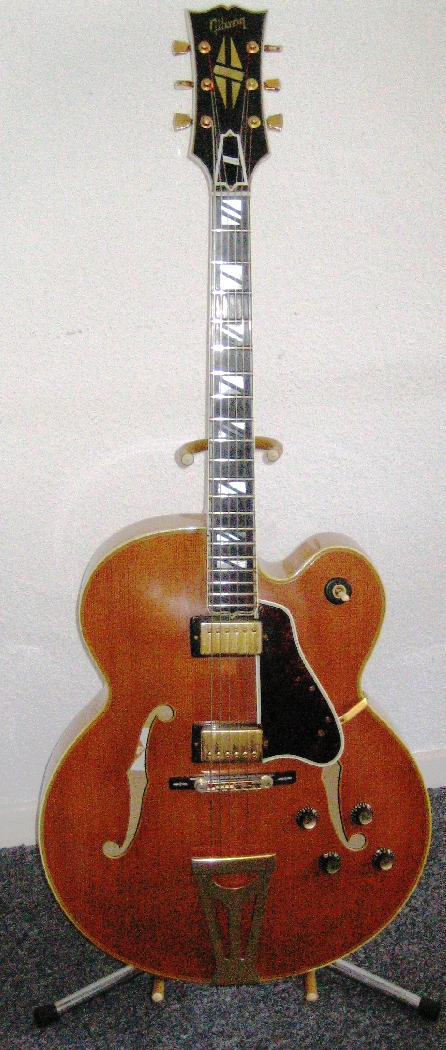
Venetian cutaway (rounded bout) on Gibson Super 400 CES

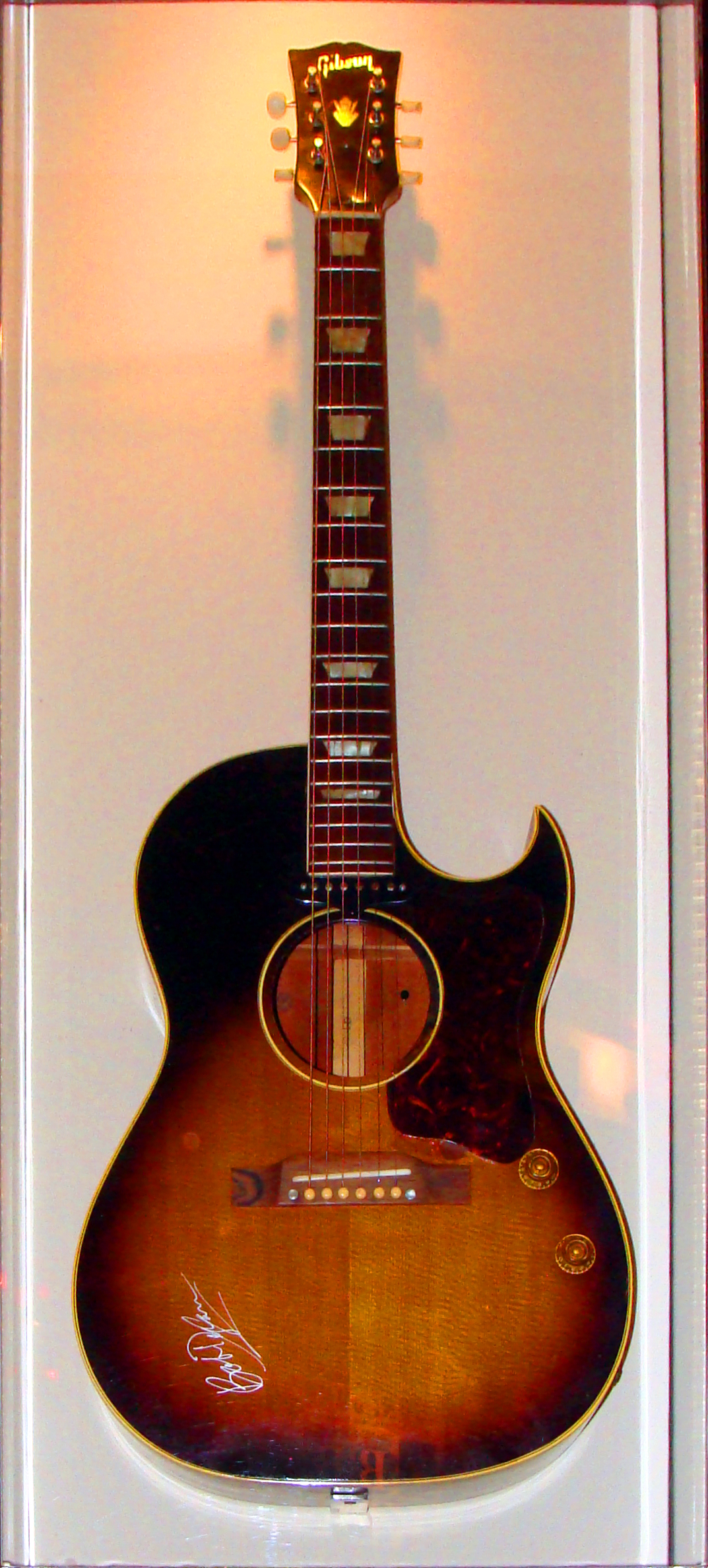
Florentine cutaway
(sharp bout, or pointed cutaway)
on Gibson CF-100E

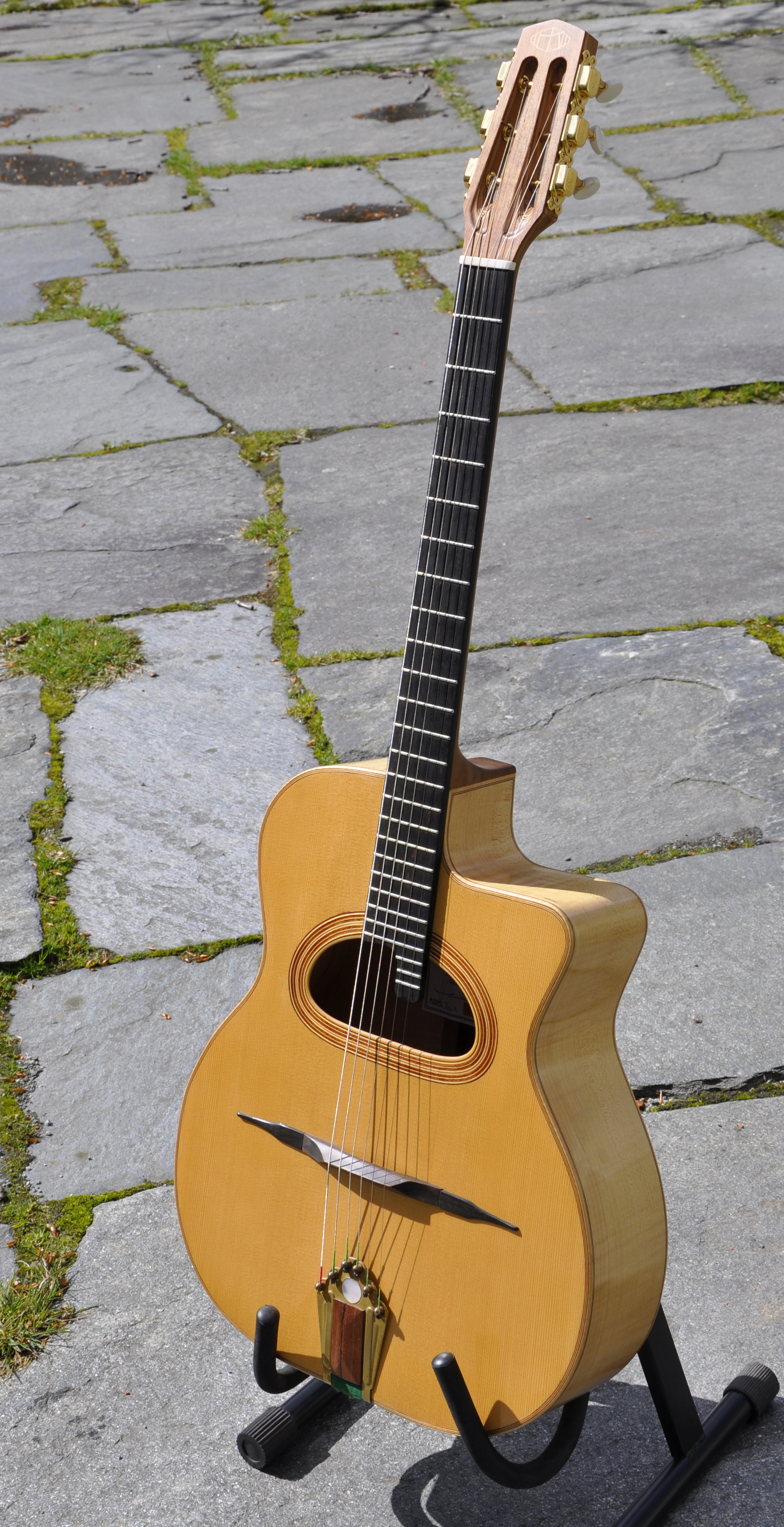
Squared-off cutaway on Selmer-Maccaferri guitar by Hanno Kiel

There are two main types of cutaways: Venetian and Florentine. A Venetian cutaway has a rounded bout. A Florentine cutaway has a sharp bout. The terms probably originate with the Gibson Guitar Corporation and probably do not reflect historic instrument-making practices of Florence and Venice.

A less common third type is the squared-off cutaway, used on the Selmer-Maccaferri guitar and some nylon-string guitars.

== Number ==
Instruments with only a lower cutaway are known as "single cutaway" instruments, and guitars with both are called "double cutaway". These terms are sometimes shortened to "single cut" (such as in the model name for a solid-body electric guitar called the "PRS Singlecut", produced by the Paul Reed Smith company) or "double cut".

=== Double cutaway ===
Double cutaway guitars

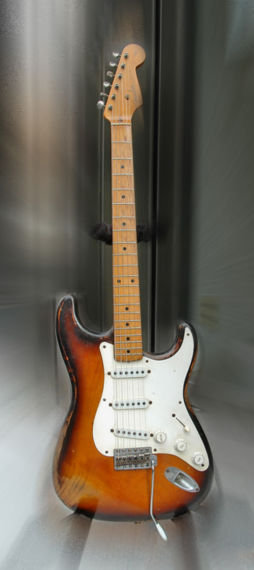
Fender Stratocaster

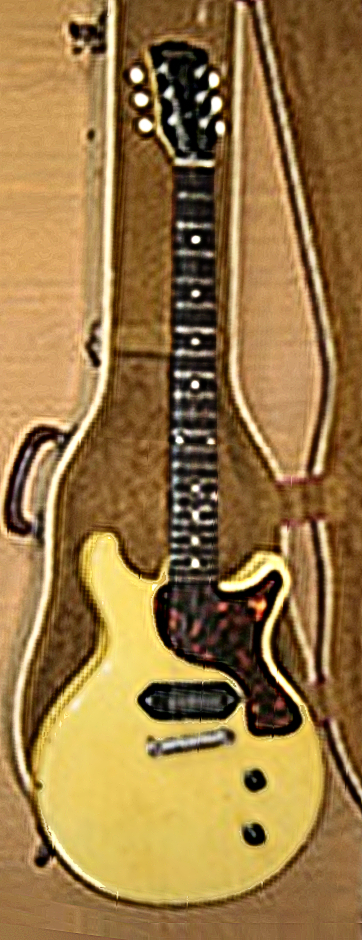
Gibson Les Paul Junior DC

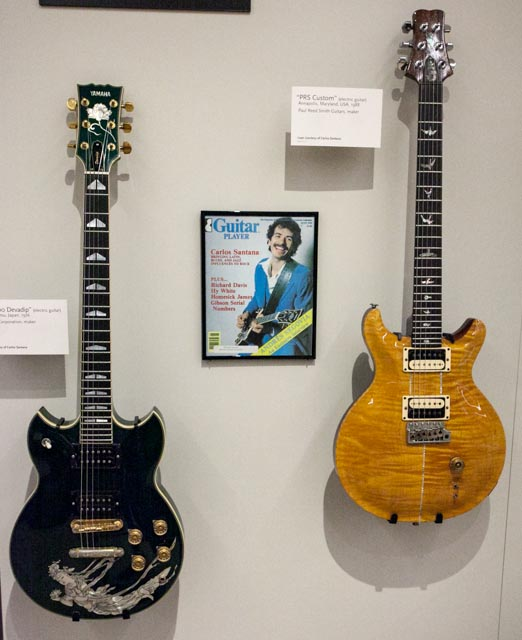
left: Yamaha SG,
right: PRS Custom

Single cutaway guitars

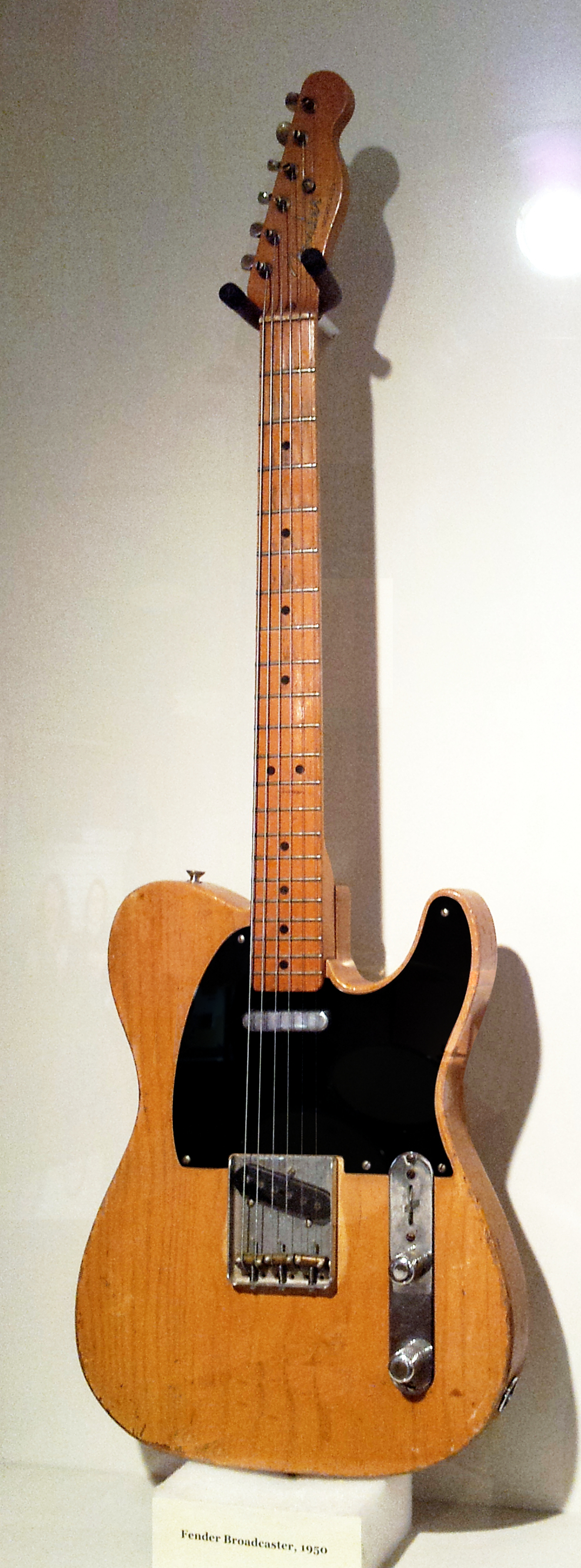
Fender Telecaster

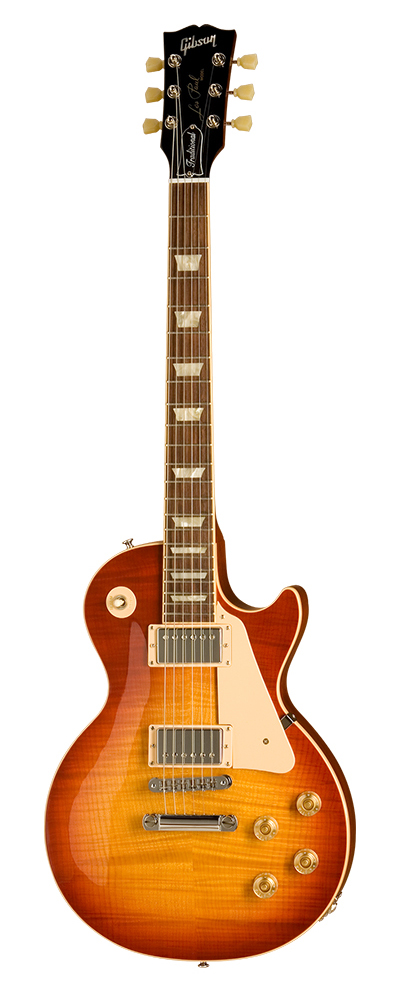
Gibson Les Paul

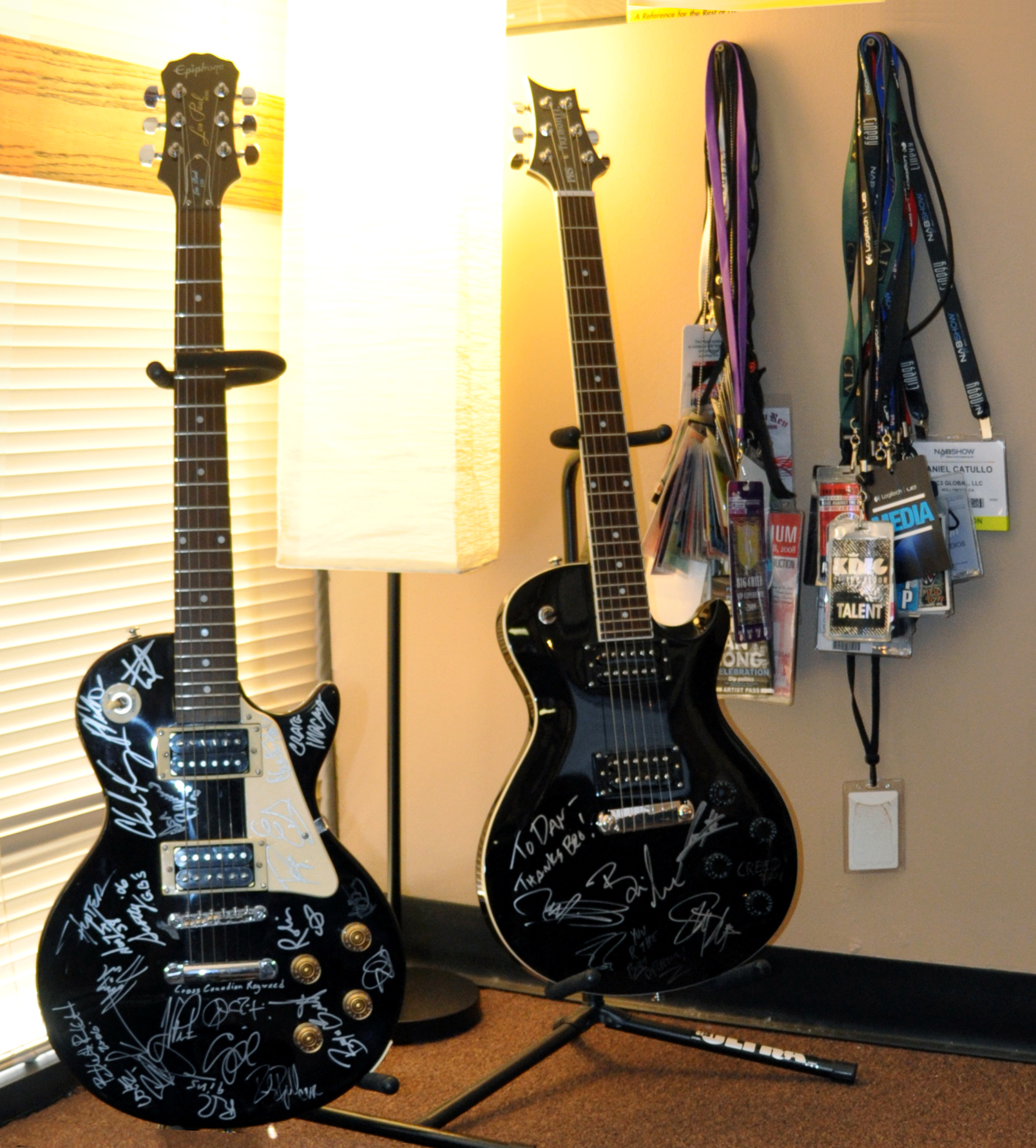
left: Epiphone Les Paul,
right: PRS Mark Tremonti sig.

As well as the more common lower cutaway, many instruments have an upper cutaway, sometimes smaller than the lower one, or sometimes about the same size. This is mainly seen on electric guitars, as the reduction in body size resulting from a double cutaway would be detrimental to the sound quality of an acoustic guitar. Double cutaways allow the thumb as well as the fingers to move past the neck-body join. In addition, the strap button on double cutaway guitars is typically positioned on the end of the upper horn, further up the neck than on guitars without a cutaway. This improves the instrument's balance when played with a strap. A double cutaway also facilitates left-handed use of right-handed instruments.

In some Gibson guitars, models with two cutaways are abbreviated with a "DC" after the name, such as in the Les Paul Studio DC, the Les Paul Standard DC, the Les Paul Special DC, and the Les Paul Junior DC. Since more single cut versions of these guitars are produced than the doublecut versions, if the model name of these guitars is not followed by "DC", "double cut", or "double cutaway", the assumed reference is to the single cutaway models.
