= Gibson Les Paul Special =

Electric guitar

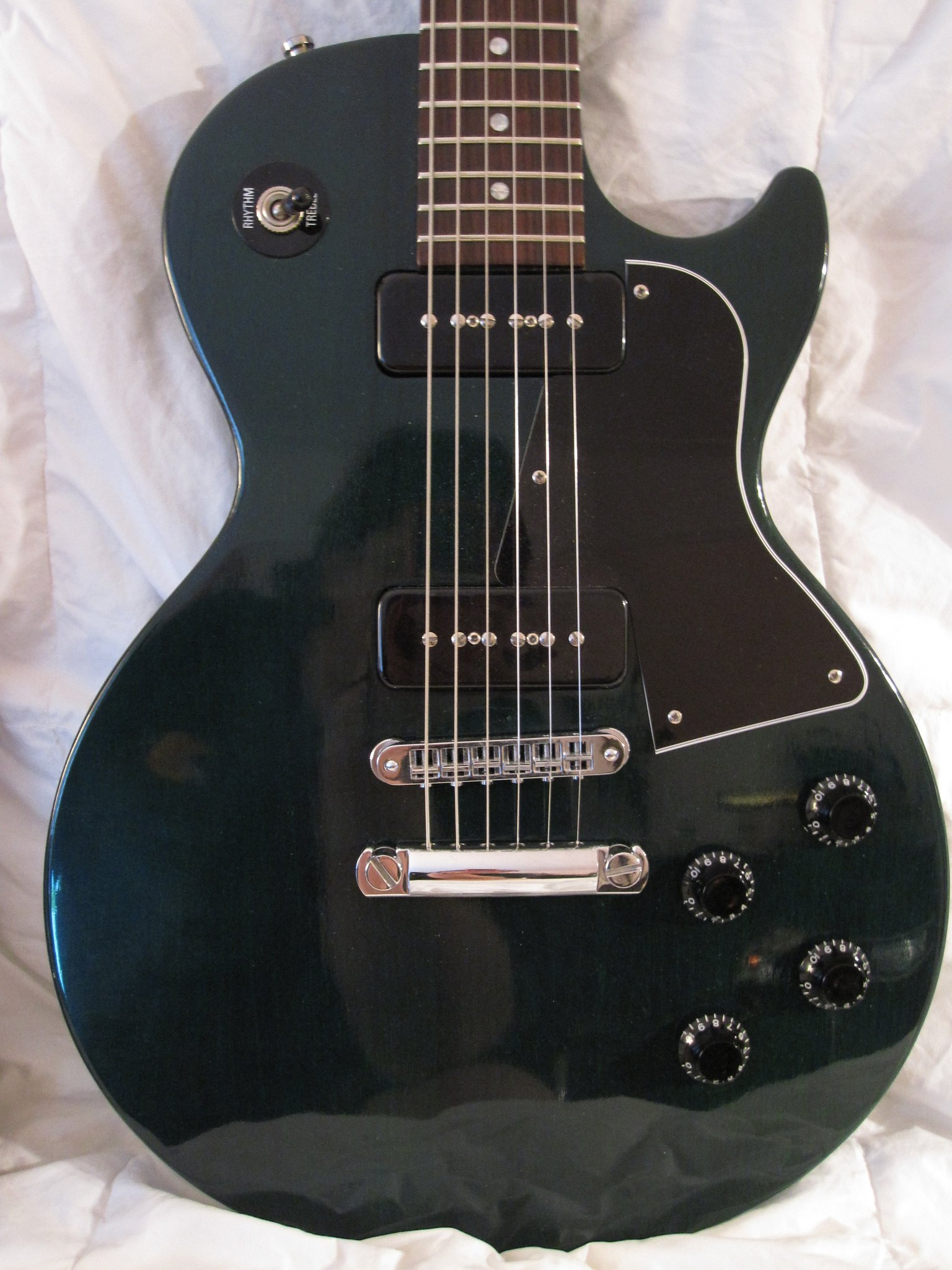
- Gibson Les Paul Special Singlecut in Spearmint (1998)
- Manufacturer: Gibson
- Period: 1955–1959; 1959–1961 (as SG Special); 1972/1974/1976; 1977/1978–2013; 2015–present

Construction
- Body type: Solid
- Neck joint: Set
- Scale: 24.75"

Woods
- Body: Mahogany
- Neck: Mahogany
- Fretboard: Rosewood

Hardware
- Bridge: Wraparound / Tune-o-matic (reissue)
- Pickup(s): 2 Single-coil, P-90

Colors available
- TV yellow, white, cherry red

The Gibson Les Paul Special is a variation of the Gibson Les Paul guitar. It was introduced in 1955. It is designed to be an intermediate level instrument, at a price point and trim level between the low-cost Les Paul Junior and the standard Les Paul.

== Overview ==
Like most of Gibson's other budget models, the Les Paul Special was produced in a TV Yellow finish, which was made by Gibson as a finish that would look good on black and white television. In 1958, the model received a major change when it was introduced as a doublecut model instead of the traditional singlecut.

In 1961, the Les Paul received a drastic change when it was redesigned into what would become known as the Gibson SG. Les Paul's contract had expired by 1963, bringing a change to the submodels. When the contract was renewed in 1968, the original models were rebooted.

== Models ==
The list of Special models manufactured since 1955.

=== Single Cutaway ===
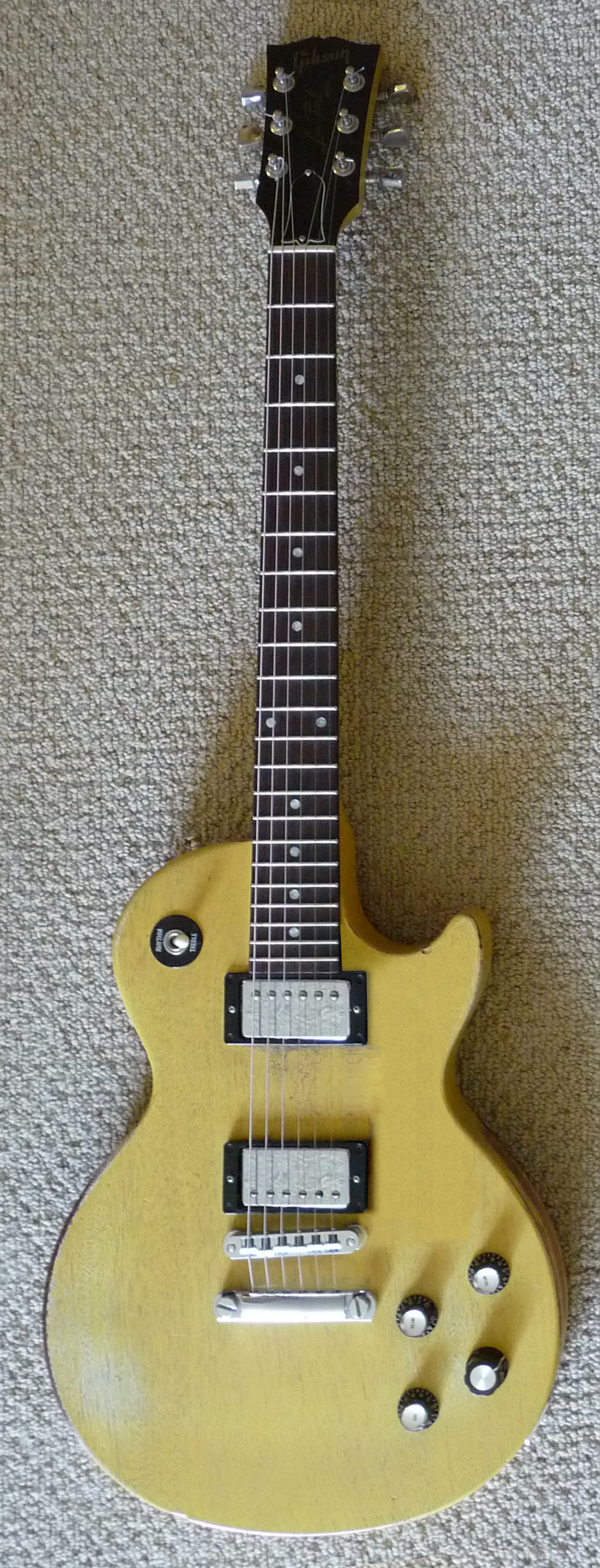
Gibson Les Paul Faded Special TV Yellow (speed knobs were swapped for SG Top Hat knobs)

- 1955–1958: Les Paul Special (Single Cutaway)
- 1974: Les Paul '55 Special limited edition
- 1974/1977/(1978)–1981: Les Paul '55 (Special Single Cutaway Reissue)
- 1989–1998: Les Paul Junior II (Les Paul Special Single Cutaway Reissue)
- 2019–present: Les Paul Special (reissue with wrap tailpiece; vintage cherry and TV yellow finishes)

variations

- 1996–1999: Les Paul Special SL
- 1999–2003: Les Paul Junior Special
- 2001–2005: Les Paul Junior Special Plus
- 2001–2002: Les Paul Junior Special With Humbucker
- 2003–(2005): Les Paul Special Faded With Humbucker
- 2003–2006: Les Paul Junior Special Faded With Humbucker
- 2006–2008: Les Paul Special New Century
- 2009–2011: Les Paul Junior Special Robot
- 2011: Les Paul Special Humbucker
- 2012–2013: Les Paul Junior Special Humbucker
- 2012–2013: Les Paul Junior Special P-90
- 2014: Les Paul Special AAA Flame Top Semi-Hollowbody

=== Double Cutaway ===
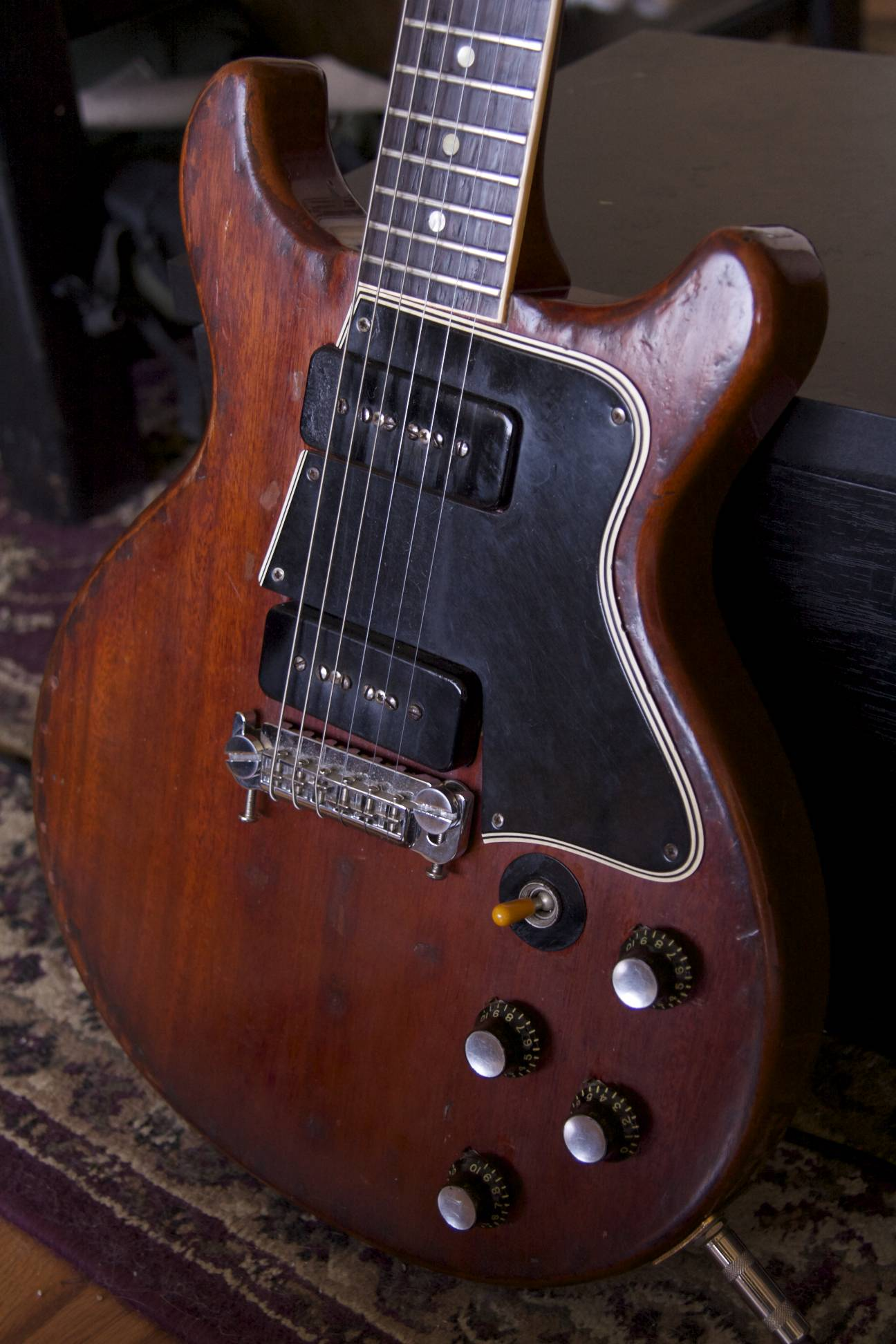
1960 SG Special (renamed from "Les Paul Special Doublecut" in 1959) The guitar on the photo features later aftermarket Badass tailpiece bridge, similar to so called "Pigtail" bridge.

- 1958–/1959 Les Paul Special (Double Cutaway)
- 1959: Les Paul Special 3/4 (Double Cutaway)
- 1959–1961: SG Special (Les Paul Special Double Cutaway)
- 1976–1989: Les Paul Special Double Cutaway (1st Reissue)
- 1993–1995: Les Paul Special Double Cutaway (2nd Reissue)
- 2015: Les Paul Special Double Cutaway 2015

variations

- 1994: Centennial Les Paul Special Double Cutaway
- 1999–2002: Les Paul Junior Lite
- 2003–2008: Les Paul Faded Double Cutaway
