= Gibson Spirit =

Guitar model (produced 1982-86)

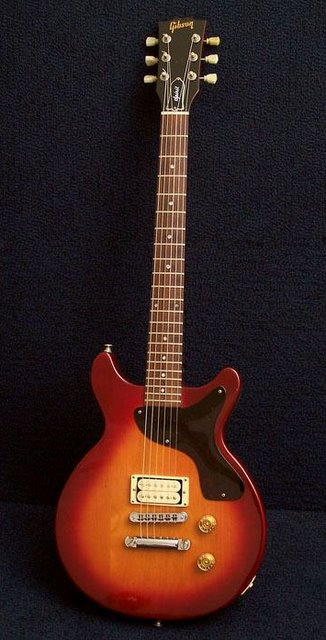
- 1984 Gibson Spirit I.
- Manufacturer: Gibson
- Period: 1982–1986

Construction
- Body type: Solid
- Neck joint: Set

Woods
- Body: Poplar, Mahogany, Maple, Alder
- Neck: Mahogany, Maple
- Fretboard: Ebony, Rosewood

Hardware
- Bridge: Schaller 2-piece wrap-around or Tune-o-matic with stop-bar or Kahler tremolo
- Pickup(s): 1 or 2 Humbuckers, or S/S/H

Colors available
- Various solid, natural, and sunburst finishes

The Gibson Spirit was a guitar model sold under Gibson and Epiphone USA nameplates in the 1980s. This article does not refer to the made-in-China Spirit guitar sold under the Gibson Baldwin Music Education nameplate.

== Origins ==
The Gibson Spirit is a lesser-known model produced from 1982 to 1986 by Gibson in the Nashville, Tennessee, and Kalamazoo, Michigan, factories. It was initially produced in the Kalamazoo factory under the Epiphone nameplate. In response to poor sales, some Epiphone models were changed to Gibson, and a faint Epiphone logo can be seen under the Gibson logo on the peghead. Later models were produced as Gibsons in Nashville. The Spirit appears to have been modelled after the Les Paul Junior double-cutaway model, with the primary differences being the use of modern single-coil and humbucker pickups, and cutaways at the 20th fret rather than the 22nd.

== Models and variations ==
Common to all Spirit models is the flat top and back. One control cavity is routed into the rear of the guitar. All spirits have a double-cutaway design, with the upper horn slightly longer than the lower. The neck is set (glued) into the body and has 22 frets with pearl dot inlays. Some models have flamed/tiger maple tops and transparent/sunburst finishes. Truss rod covers on Spirit models vary, with most simply saying "Spirit" or "Spirit Made By Gibson" (on Epiphone models). Humbuckers are Gibson 1959 Les Paul Reissue models (sometimes called "Tim Shaw" pickups after the Gibson engineer who led the design team). Some of these pickups have white coils and get mistaken for Dirty Fingers, but they are medium-output alnico pickups, whereas Dirty Fingers are high-output ceramic pickups. Early models have the upper strap button located on the back of the guitar at the neck joint, while later models have a strap button at the tip of the upper horn. Tuners are typically the Kluson-type "tulip" knob tuners, though some Spirits (particularly XPL models) have enclosed tuners.

=== "Spirit I" ===
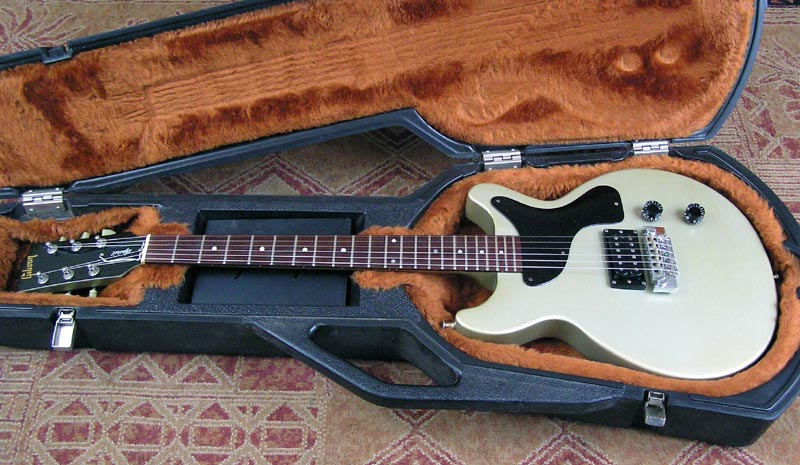
1983 Gibson Spirit I

This model is characterized by a single humbucker in the bridge position. The peghead is the standard Gibson shape on both Gibson and Epiphone models, with three tuners per side. A tortoiseshell-colored pickguard covers the neck joint and protects the upper body. Early models are said to have poplar bodies, with later ones being produced in mahogany or alder, some with maple tops. Early models also have maple necks. The original bridge was the Schaller 455, a combination bridge/wraparound tailpiece with six brass saddles. Some 1984 models came with a Nashville Tune-O-Matic and separate stop tailpiece. There is one tone and one volume control. This model was first produced beginning in 1982 and ending in 1984.

=== "Spirit II" ===
This model differs from Spirit I only in that it has a humbucker in the neck position as well as one in the bridge position, and there is no pickguard. Sunburst finishes are more common in the Spirit II model than in the Spirit I. Body binding is also more commonly found on Spirit II models than on Spirit I. There are two volume controls, one tone control, and one Les Paul style Rhythm/Treble switch.

=== "Spirit XPL" ===
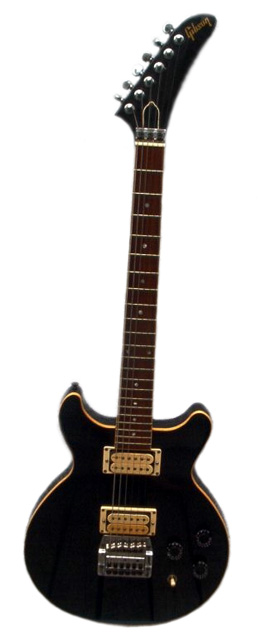
Two-Humbucker Spirit XPL

This model differs from normal Spirit models in that it has an Explorer-like headstock with six inline tuners. This model commonly has a Kahler Flyer tremolo and locking nut, with the body routed to accommodate the tremolo. Made to compete with Super-Strat metal guitars, it is rumored to have been available with an S/S/H pickup configuration, though is commonly found with either only a lone humbucker or dual humbuckers. This model was produced in 1985 and early 1986, only under the Gibson nameplate. A custom shop version of a red Spirit XPL with one humbucker, a Kahler/Gibson tremolo bridge that used standard Gibson bridge posts, and body binding but no neck binding was observed on eBay in July/August 2010 bearing a 1983 serial number.

=== The "SR-71": Spirit or not? ===
The SR-71 is mentioned in some Spirit research but generally does not fit the mold of the traditional Spirit. If the XPL is a step toward a Super-Strat, the SR-71 was the final destination. The SR-71 has a bolt-on neck, Floyd Rose tremolo, S/S/H pickups, and took on more of a Strat shape. The guitar was actually designed by a member of the Charvel family who had no affiliation with the Jackson/Charvel company at the time. Other Gibson models that are more reminiscent of the SR-71 are the WRC, the U2, and the US-1; all of which are Super-Strats.

== Notable Spirits ==
On April 18, 2010, a blue prototype Spirit II (double-humbucker) XPL originally sold to Chris Hayes of Huey Lewis's News fame was sold on eBay. The auction included the original Gibson invoice with Hayes's name and shipping address, as well as a letter of appraisal from vintage guitar expert George Gruhn. The guitar's humbuckers had been changed to rail types, and the tremolo system was a floating Kahler style that used standard Gibson adjustable bridge posts, rather than the production Flyer tremolo that mounts to the body with a trim ring. A coil-tap switch had also been added amongst the guitar's standard controls. The guitar's serial number identified it as a very early 1985 model, and included an "Original Gibson Prototype" stamp screened on the back of the headstock.
