= P-90 =

Guitar pickup

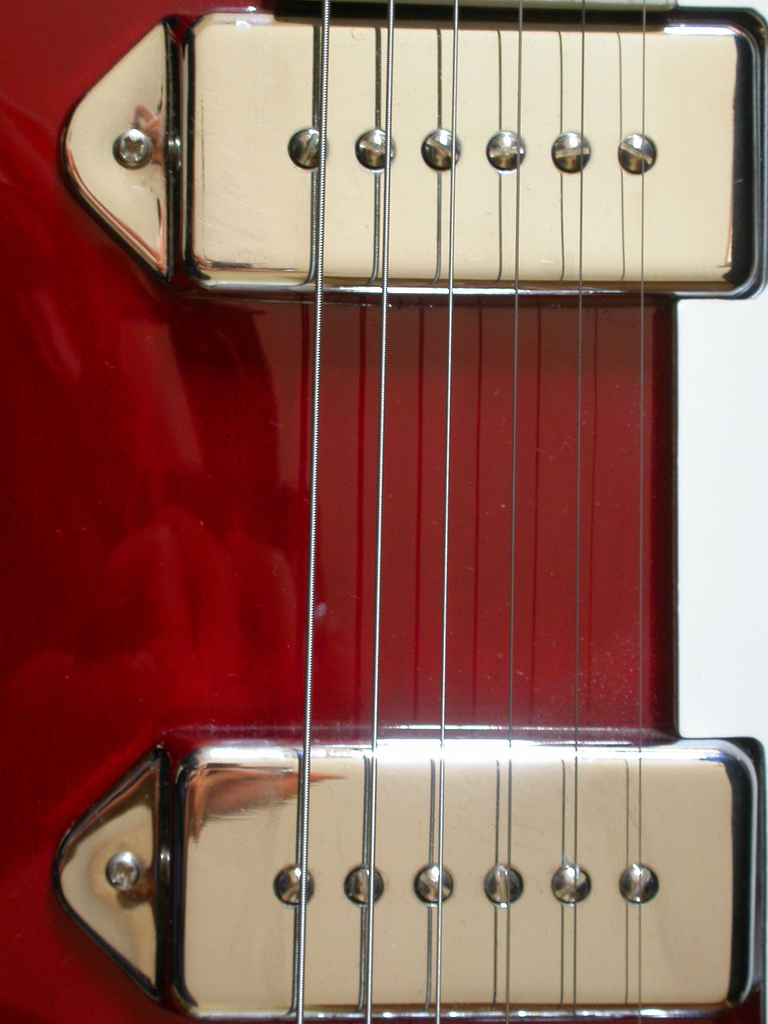
- Manufacturer: Gibson
- Period: 1946-present
- Type: Passive single-coil
- Magnet type: Alnico 3 (early), Alnico 5 (later); aftermarket pickups with other magnets are available

Output specifications
- Voltage (RMS), V: 241.1mV at 6.405kHz resonant frequency
- Impedance, kΩ: 7.5kΩ to 8.5kΩ

Sonic qualities
- Resonant frequency, Hz: 6.405kHz

The P-90 (sometimes written P90) is a single-coil electric guitar pickup produced by Gibson Guitar Corporation since 1946, as well as other vendors. Compared to other single coil designs, such as the Fender single coil, the bobbin for a P-90 has a wider, shallower bobbin. The Fender-style single-coil has a taller, narrower bobbin, with the windings positioned closer to the individual pole pieces. This makes the P-90 produce a tone seen as a midpoint for pickups: "Sharper" than humbuckers, but with less top-end than single-coils. As with other single-coil pickups, the P-90 is subject to AC-hum unless some form of cancelation is used.

== History ==
Officially, P-90 pickups were introduced in 1946, when Gibson resumed guitar production after World War II. The name refers to the part number as designated by the company. They were initially used to replace Gibson's original "bar" or "blade" pickup, also known as the Charlie Christian pickup, on models such as the ES-150, and by the end of the 1940s it was the standard pickup on all models. The soap-bar-style P-90 debuted with the Les Paul electric guitar in 1952.

The P-90's reign as the Gibson standard pickup was short-lived, as a new design of pickup, the humbucker, was introduced in 1957. Equipped with double-coils, the new pickup boasted less output ( 125 mv ) and less hum, although with less high-end-response. This new pickup, occasionally named PAF ("Patent applied for"), very quickly took over as the preferred choice for all Gibson-models, relegating the P-90 to budget-models such as the ES-330, the Les Paul Junior and Special, and the SG Junior and Special, such as those used by Pete Townshend and Carlos Santana for their brighter, rawer sound. This trend continued throughout the 1960s and particularly in the early 1970s, where the P-90 all but disappeared from the entire Gibson-range. By the 1970s, smaller single-coil pickups, mini-humbucking pickups, and uncovered humbucking pickups began replacing the P-90 pickups on Gibson's budget and lower-end models.

In 1968, Gibson reissued the original, single-cutaway Les Paul, one version being a Goldtop with P-90 pickups. In 1972, they produced Limited-Edition-reissues, called the "58 Reissue" though actually based on the 54 Goldtop Les Paul, with a stopbar tailpiece; and the 54 Custom, the "Black Beauty", equipped with a P-90 in the bridge and an Alnico V pickup at the neck. Total production of these guitars was quite small. In 1974, Gibson put the P-90 pickup in their Les Paul '55, a reissue of the Les Paul Special from that era. It was followed in 1976 by the Les Paul Special double-cutaway (DC) model and in 1978 by the Les Paul Pro (which had an ebony fingerboard with trapezoid inlays). Since the 1970s, the P-90 pickup has seen some success in various models in the Gibson line, mostly through reissues and custom versions of existing models. Currently it is featured most-prominently on the Les Paul Faded Doublecut, and certain models in the Historic range.

In the early 1970s, punk rock guitarists such as Johnny Thunders of The New York Dolls began using Les Paul Juniors and Les Paul Specials equipped with P-90s because of the cutting overdriven sound and the inexpensive nature of the guitars. In both The Dolls and The Heartbreakers, Thunders influenced younger punk rock guitarists who adopted his look and choice of guitar. Mick Jones of The Clash and Steve Jones of The Sex Pistols both owned Les Paul Juniors, and the double-cutaway Junior became the first choice for punk rock guitarists.

The P-90 was also marketed by Gibson in the 1970s as the "Laid Back" pickup, as part of a line of "named" pickups.

For the 2014 model year, the Les Paul Melody-Maker featured a variant of the P-90 pickup called the P-90S, inspired by the original pickup of the Gibson ES-125. This variant possesses six rectangular Alnico-slug-pole-pieces with no individual height-adjustment.

== Varieties ==
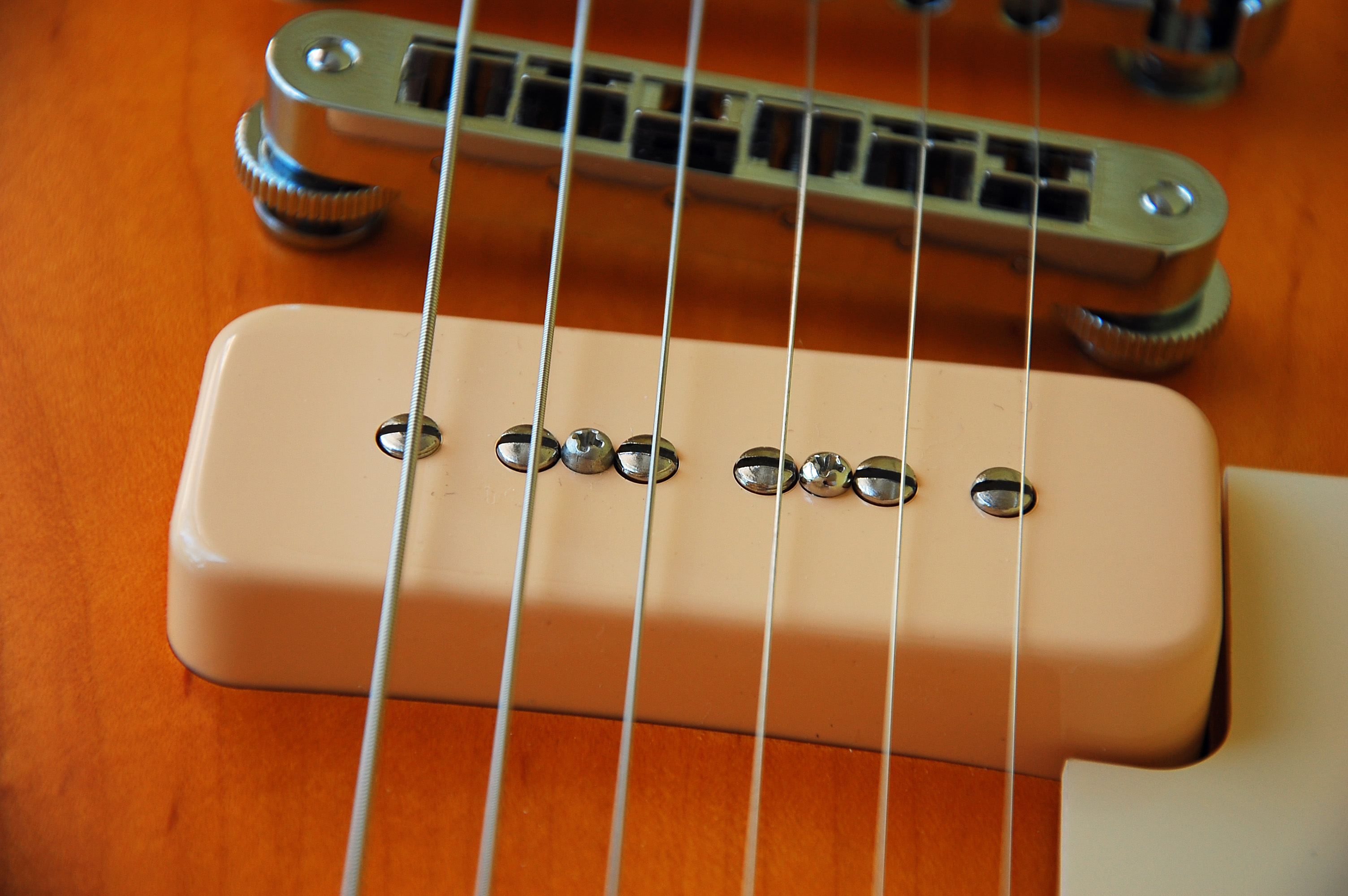
Gibson P-90 soap bar

There are three major varieties of P-90 casing:

- Soap-bar, which have a rectangular shape and mounting-screws contained within the coil-perimeter, is positioned between the pole-pieces of the second and third, and fourth and fifth, strings. The soap-bar nickname comes from its shape and proportions, and that the P-90s shape and white color on the original Gibson Les Paul as a means of distinguishing them and others sharing their basic configurations from latter generation P90 pickups.

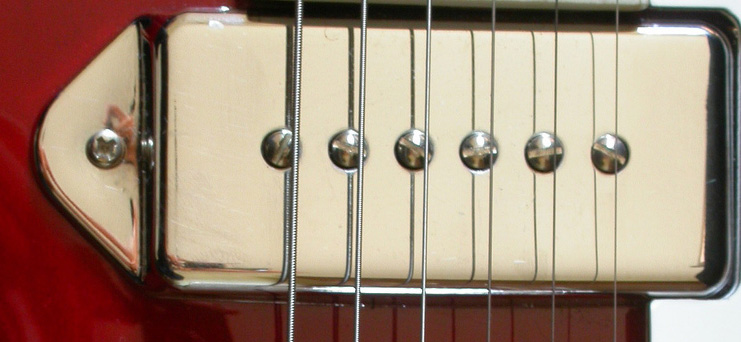
P-90 dog ear

- Dog-ears have mounting-screw extensions on both sides of the pickup. These were commonly mounted on Gibson's hollow-body guitars like the ES-330 and occasionally on solid-body models like the Les Paul Junior. The same pickups were also available on Epiphone-models (since Gibson was building Epiphone guitars in the 1950s).
- Humbucker-style allows a P-90 to be retroactively installed on guitars that came with humbuckers. The existing routing in the guitar-body must be altered to fit a standard P-90; the humbucker-style casing minimizes the effort to install one and any potential alignment-issues. As a result, pseudo-P-90s in a humbucker-style casing are common (see below).

== Sound ==
Being a single-coil-design, the tone of a P-90 is somewhat-brighter than a humbucker, though not quite as crisp and bright as Fender's single-coil pickups. The tone therefore shares some of the single coil traits, but having large amounts of midrange and often described as “thick". The reason behind the tonal difference between P-90s and Fender single-coil pickups is due to P-90s using bar-magnets set under the pole-pieces, much like a humbucker, whereas Fender single-coils use rod magnets as the polepieces. Popular guitars that use or have the option of using P-90s are the Gibson SG, Gibson Les Paul, and the Epiphone Casino. Fender Jazzmaster pickups are often confused with the P-90; however, their only similarity is cosmetic, since there are many significant visual, dimensional, and electrical differences.

The placement of the guitar pickups by Gibson before World War II emphasized the treble-response to compensate for the low frequencies of the electronics in the bass. The increased output and high end afforded by the P-90 design allowed the company to position the pickup closer to the neck.

All Gibson P-90 pickups (vintage and otherwise) were machine-wound on Leesona coil-winding machines, although their electrical specifications may vary slightly due to variations in the winding. In common with many other modern pickup-types, there are two versions of modern P-90s: Neck and bridge. Their DC resistance tends to be around 8kΩ. Early P-90 pickups made before approximately 1974 were manufactured with no difference in the bridge and neck position and were interchangeable. After winding, pickups were hung on a rack holding twenty pickups and assembled according to the model of guitar they were to be used on (Soap-Bar or Dog-Ear). Earlier pickups (around 1952) had Alnico 3 magnets, but in 1957 Gibson switched to the stronger Alnico 5.
