= Epiphone Wilshire =

Electric guitar

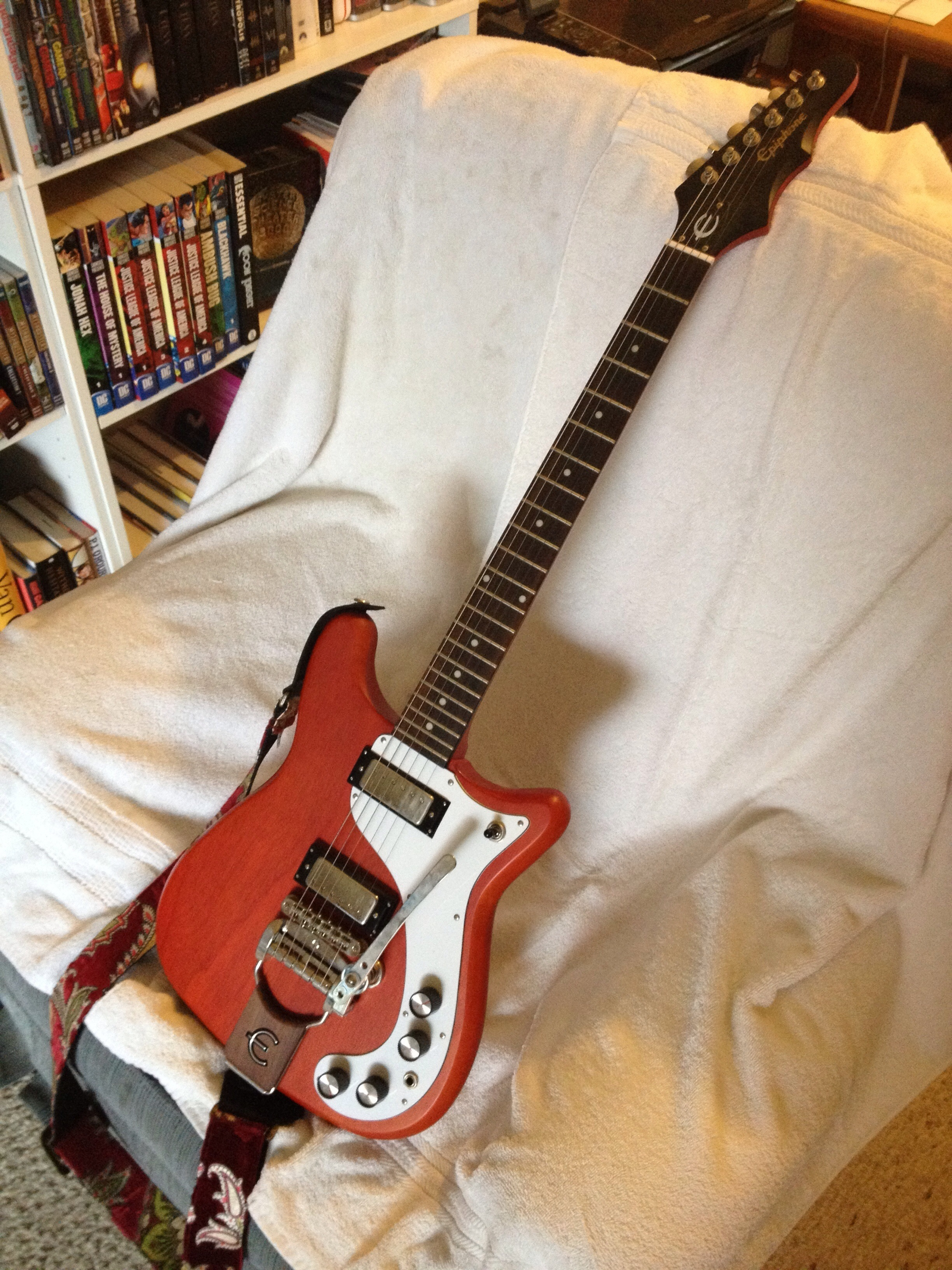
- Manufacturer: Epiphone
- Period: 1959-1970, 1982-85, 2008-current

Construction
- Body type: Solid body, double cutaway
- Neck joint: Set neck
- Scale: 24.75"

Woods
- Body: Mahogany
- Neck: Mahogany
- Fretboard: Rosewood

Hardware
- Pickup(s): 2 soapbar P-90s (1959-1962, 2020), 2 mini-humbuckers (1963-1970, 1982-1985, 2009-), 3 mini-humbuckers (1982-1985)

Colors available
- Polaris white, Cherry red, Various Sunbursts and custom finishes

The Epiphone Wilshire is a solid body electric guitar made by Epiphone from 1959 to 1970. After Epiphone was acquired by Gibson in 1957, this was one of the many models produced to rival the very popular Fender Stratocaster. The original Wilshire's sound was known for its pop, surf, and garage rock sound, although it could also be useful for "heavier" music of the 60's. It was positioned between the higher specification Crestwood and the lower specification Coronet. The Wilshire was reissued in two versions, the Wilshire II and Wilshire III, from 1982 to 1985. It was reissued again starting in 2009 and remains in the Epiphone catalog.

== History ==
The Wilshire was introduced in 1959 as a symmetrical, double-cut, solid body guitar with a square-edged body and two P-90 pickups. For the 1963 model year, the guitar was substantially changed to an asymmetrical shape with rounded edges and two alnico mini-humbucker pickups. It remained largely in this configuration for the remainder of its production run. In the 60s, Epiphone also experimented with new, vibrant colors such as California Coral, as seen on some 1965 Wilshires. The Wilshire was reissued from 1982 to 1985 as the Wilshire II and Wilshire III. The Wilshire II had two mini-humbucker pickups and the Wilshire III had three. Epiphone once again reissued the Wilshire beginning in 2009. Several models were introduced: the limited edition Pro, '66 Worn (with or without "tremotone" (vibrato)) and '62 USA. In 2011, Epiphone released the Frank Iero signature Wilshire "Phant-o-Matic".

Epiphone re-released the Wilshire, along with the Coronet and Crestwood in 2020. The re-issued Wilshire came with 2 P-90 pickups, and was available in two colours, being "Cherry Red" and "Ebony". Additionally, in celebration of the 150th anniversary of Epiphone, a Wilshire featuring 2 mini-humbuckers was released, available only in a "Pacific Blue" colour.

== Reception ==
Doug Robertson of Premier Guitar praised the Wilshire, saying it was "perfect for old-school garage rock." He also stated that it "is the epitome of functional design. It’s simple, durable and versatile, yet it’s stylish enough to leap off an album cover." Robertson also noted: "This neck works great for power chords and tight rhythm jabs, but it may not be the most lead-player-friendly." In reviewing the '62 Wilshire for the September 2009 issue of Guitar Player magazine, it was noted that "this thing really rings out acoustically, with a bright snap to the notes that is underpinned by a rich, woody resonance."

== Notable players ==
- Bruce Springsteen
- Frank Iero plays a modified Epiphone Wilshire, the Epiphone Wilshire Phant-o-matic.
- Jimi Hendrix played a few Wilshires, one of which is expected to sell for over one million dollars at auction as of August, 2023.
- MC5 guitarist Wayne Kramer can be seen playing an Epiphone Wilshire on the 1972 Beat Club sessions.
