= Roy Lanham =

American country and Western swing guitarist (1923–1991)

- Born: Roy Howard Lanham; January 16, 1923; Corbin, Kentucky, United States
- Died: February 14, 1991 (aged 68)
- Genres: Country, Western swing
- Occupation: Musician
- Instrument: Guitar
- Formerly of: The Fidgety Four; Whippoorwills; Archie Campbell (comedian); Archie Campbell; Sons of the Pioneers; Smiley Burnette

Roy Howard Lanham (January 16, 1923 – February 14, 1991) was an American guitarist. Best known for his work with the Western-style vocal band Sons of the Pioneers between 1961 and 1986, he had a long career that spanned from the prewar years to his death. His main style was early country and Western swing, although he could also play jazz remarkably well. His name never quite achieved widespread notoriety; but within the music industry and his peers, he was considered on a par with the likes of Merle Travis and Chet Atkins.

== Biography ==
=== Early years ===
Roy Lanham was born in Corbin, Kentucky. He learned to play the guitar at an early age, and by his teenage years he was playing rhythm guitar for different bands' radio performances. In 1939, country singer and humorist Archie Campbell auditioned Lanham for inclusion in his group, and was so impressed by the youngster's playing that Lanham left with Campbell's group on the very next day. After moving to Knoxville, TN, he worked with the band The Stringdusters, which included two eclectic musicians also well versed in jazz—Homer Haynes and Jethro Burns (who would later become the musical humor duo Homer and Jethro). The two introduced Lanham to jazz, and he soon became influenced by the guitar-playing of the likes of Charlie Christian and Django Reinhardt.

In 1940, Lanham formed a group called The Fidgety Four, which was soon joined by singer and composer Gene Austin. The name of the band was soon changed to The Whippoorwills because of a line from Austin's classic song My Blue Heaven. Lanham played with the Whippoorwills until 1955, when they disbanded. During the 1940s he also played with the Delmore Brothers and his Gibson L-5 guitar, electrified by means of a DeArmond pickup, can be heard in the majority of the brothers' King recording sessions, a guitar that he later discarded in favor of a hollow-body Epiphone Emperor. Other notable names for which he performed was Western swing Hank Penny's, in which Lanham's driving, jazzy guitar soloing were a signature feature; also, Loretta Lynn, Spade Cooley and others.

In 1950, a busy Lanham would join the Los Angeles cast of the Smiley Burnette radio show. He would appear in between 300 and 400 episodes of the show.

=== With The Sons of the Pioneers ===
Upon the death of Sons of the Pioneers' guitarist Karl Farr in 1961, Lanham joined the band—a band with which he would remain for nearly three decades. During this time, Lanham appeared in several motion pictures alongside the Pioneers, among which probably his most memorable performance was on 1963's short film 30 Minutes at Gunsight.

=== Later years and death ===
In the course of the 1980s, Lanham suffered several major health setbacks. In 1980, he had to have open heart surgery, which, however, did not stop him from returning to the stage alongside the Pioneers. Later in the decade, however, he was diagnosed with bladder cancer and shortly after surgery he suffered a stroke, from which he somewhat recovered, although not sufficiently to rejoin the band. Finally, in 1989 he was diagnosed with prostate cancer, of which he eventually died two years later.

== Legacy and style ==
Perhaps because of the circumscribed styles (Western swing, pre-Elvis rockabilly, vocal-quartet country, and country jazz) he played, and the fact that he almost never acted as the main member of bands, Lanham's skills far exceeded his posthumous fame. Perhaps unfairly, he was considered "too jazz for country and too country for jazz." Or perhaps it was because of his extensive work as a session guitarist. Still, Lanham befriended, collaborated with and earned high praise from some of the most respected guitarists of the 20th century:

Merle Travis said of Lanham: "I get out a couple of Roy Lanham albums and play them. Then I listen to some of my recorded efforts and come up with this sort of remark: Dadblame, buddy, that's awful!" Barney Kessel said of him, "take off your boots and hat, and you can be a great jazz player."

His signature guitar style consisted of swingy, driving single-string flatpick soloing, as well as fingerstyle chordal melodies. He himself described his playing in this manner: "I alternate between chord style and single-string style. I don't use my pick when I'm playing chord style; I use my thumb and three fingers. People ask me what happens to my pick when I go from a single-string to a chord chorus. A lot of guys stick the pick in their mouth, but I palm mine between my first two fingers."

== Selected discography ==
- Blues, stay away from me (Delmore Brothers, 1949) - electric guitar
- Hillbilly Boogie (Delmore Brothers, 1946) - guitar
- Roy Lanham - Sizzling Strings (solo Album, 1996 reissue)
- Hard Life Blues (with the Whippoorwills)
- The Most Exciting Guitar - (Dolton Records, 1962)
