= Gibson Theodore Standard =

Mahogany electric guitar by the Gibson Guitar Company

Theodore Standard
- Manufacturer: Gibson
- Period: 1957; 2022–present

Construction
- Body type: Solid
- Neck joint: Slimtaper
- Scale: 24¾ inches 628.65 mm

Woods
- Body: Mahogany
- Neck: Mahogany
- Fretboard: Rosewood

Hardware
- Bridge: Tune-O-Matic
- Pickup(s): '57 Classic Plus Humbuckers; Custom Soapbar P-90 (discontinued)

Colors available
- Antique Natural, Ebony and Vintage Cherry

The Gibson Theodore Standard is a Mahogany wood Electric guitar, manufactured by the Gibson Guitar Company. The Theodore Standard was designed by the president of Gibson Theodore McCarty on 18 March 1957, it wasn't made into a model or a standard line model until 2022. The design was found in Gibsons archives and made as a Gibson custom shop model but was made a part of the standard line of guitars, it is currently in production and an active model. It features a Mahogany body and a Set-in Slimtaper mahogany neck, Nickel-plated ABR-1 Tune-O-Matic bridge and Grover Mini Ratomatic tuners for tuning, '57 Classic Plus bridge Humbucker pickups for tones, managed via master volume and tone controls, wired with Orange Drop Capacitors.

== See also ==
- Gibson Les Paul
- Gibson ES Series
- Gibson
