= G400 =

G400 may refer to:

- Epiphone G-400, a solid body electric guitar model
- Matrox G400, a 1999 graphic processor
- Logitech G400, an optical gaming mouse
- Gulfstream G400/G500/G600, a business jet
