= Epiphone Demon V =

Electric guitar sold in 2001-2002

- Manufacturer: Epiphone

The Demon V was an electric guitar manufactured by Epiphone from 2001 through 2002. It was part of the short-lived "E-Series", which was composed of updated versions and so called "extreme" versions of popular Gibson & Epiphone guitars. The Demon V was based loosely on the Jackson Randy Rhoads guitar, with offset wings, and featured a first for Epiphone: a string-thru body.

Epiphone produced a limited number of set-neck (perhaps neck-through body) offset V-shaped guitars similar to the Jackson RR1 in the mid-80s. Their production numbers were likely limited, as few surviving examples can be found today.

This guitar is rare and very hard to find, but can be bought used in places like eBay, and local music stores. There is also a V-FX series that has onboard chorus and overdrive functions. Production was limited to 1000 units worldwide, and of those 1000, 200 were the limited V-FX series.
