= Epiphone =

American musical instrument company

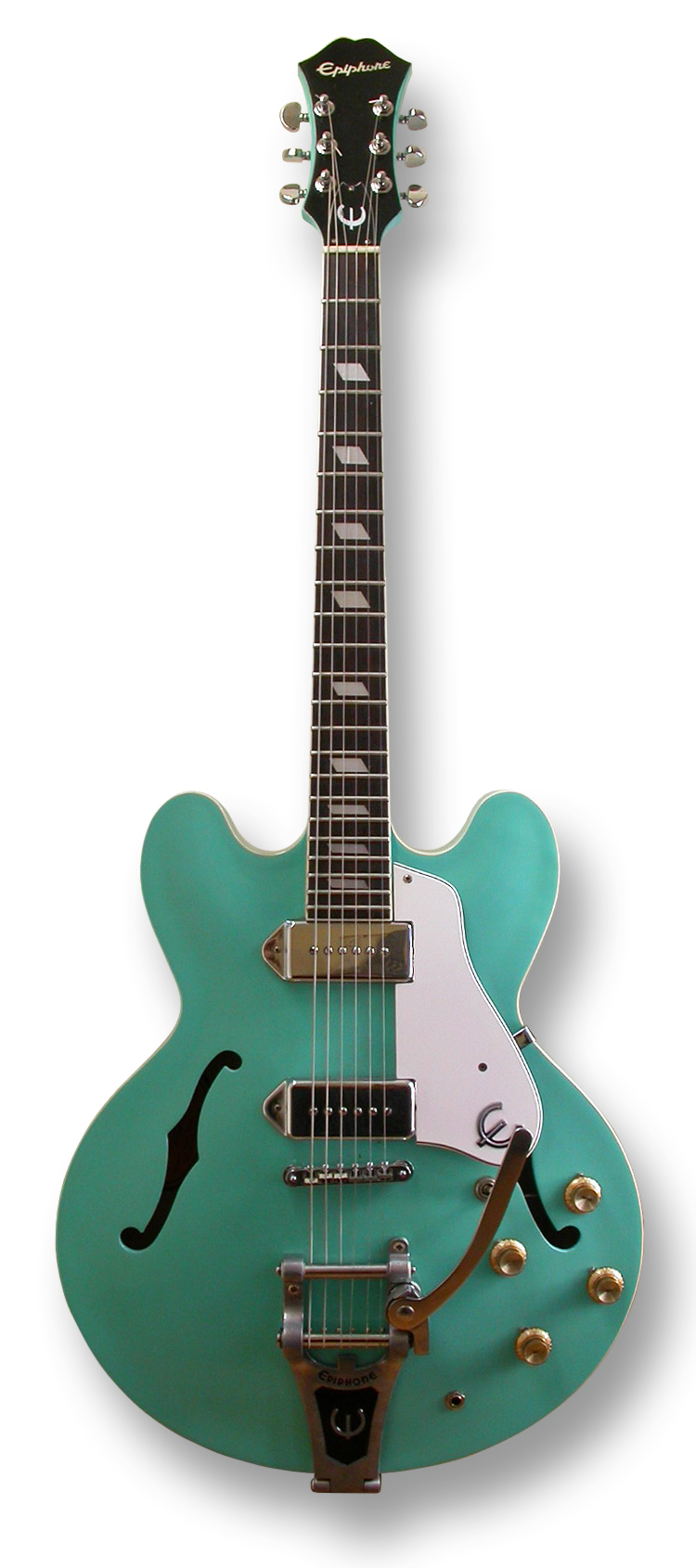
- An Epiphone Casino, one of the brand's best known models
- Formerly: Epiphone Banjo Company (1928)
- Industry: Musical instruments
- Founded: 1873; 153 years ago in Smirna, Ottoman Empire
- Founder: Anastasios Stathopoulos
- Fate: Acquired by Gibson in 1957, becoming a brand
- Headquarters: Queens, New York City, New York (1908–1957); Kalamazoo, Michigan (1957–1975); Nashville, Tennessee (1975–present), United States
- Area served: Worldwide
- Key people: Jim Rosenberg (president)
- Products: Electric, acoustic, archtop & resonator guitars Basses; Banjos; Mandolins; Ukuleles; Amplifiers; Effects units
- Parent: Gibson Brands, Inc.
- Website: epiphone.com

Epiphone (/ˈɛpɪˌfoʊn/) is an American musical instrument brand originally founded in 1873 by Anastasios Stathopoulos in İzmir, Ottoman Empire, and moved to New York City in 1908. After taking over his father's business, Epaminondas Stathopoulos named the company "Epiphone" as a combination of his own nickname "Epi" and the suffix "-phone" (from Greek phon-, "voice") in 1928, the same year it began making guitars. From the 1930s through to the early 1950s, Epiphone produced a range of both acoustic and (later) electrified archtop guitars that rivalled those produced by Gibson and were the instruments of choice of many professionals; a smaller range of flat-top guitars were also produced, some designations of which were later continued during the Gibson-owned era for the company.

In 1957 Epiphone, Inc. was purchased by Gibson, its main rival in the archtop guitar market at the time. Gibson relocated Epiphone's manufacturing operation from Philadelphia to Gibson's Kalamazoo, Michigan, factory, where production of both ranges took place until 1969, with Epiphone instruments—some with "sister" models in the Gibson line, some unique to the Epiphone line—generally considered equal in construction quality to those produced under the Gibson brand. From 1970 onwards, Gibson ceased production of Epiphones in its U.S. factory and moved production offshore for a range of cheaper models. Today, Epiphone is still used as a brand by the Gibson company, both for budget models of other Gibson instruments and for several Epiphone-exclusive models. Aside from guitars, Epiphone has also made double basses, banjos, and other string instruments, as well as amplifiers.

== History ==
Epiphone began in 1873, in Smyrna, Ottoman Empire (now İzmir, Turkey), where Greek founder Anastasios Stathopoulos made his own fiddles and lutes (specifically, the oud and the laouto). Stathopoulos moved to the United States in 1903 and continued to make his original instruments, as well as mandolins, from a factory at 35-37 36th Street in Long Island City, Queens, New York. Anastasios died in 1915, and his son, Epaminondas ("Epi"), took over.

After two years, the company became known as "The House of Stathopoulo". Just after the end of World War I, the company started to make banjos. The company produced its recording line of banjos in 1924 and, four years later, took on the name of the "Epiphone Banjo Company". It produced its first guitars (the "Epiphone Recording" models) in 1928. In 1931 the company commenced production of its "Masterbilt" range of archtop guitars which became very popular and competed successfully with the equivalent range produced at the time by Gibson, its main rival in the archtop market. After Epi died in 1943, control of the company went to his brothers, Orphie and Frixo. In 1951, a four-month-long strike caused a relocation of the company from New York City to Philadelphia. A number of Epiphone employees decided to remain in New York rather than relocate to Philadelphia, and spearheaded by George Mann, former Epiphone Vice President and Secretary, formed the nucleus of the new Guild Guitar Company, whose early archtop guitar designs owed a lot to Epiphone.

In 1957 the company was acquired by Gibson parent company CMI, who merged Epiphone operations with Gibson. Between 1957 and 1969, the Gibson-owned production of Epiphone instruments took a parallel path to those marketed under the Gibson brand, with many equivalents between the two lines but also some instruments unique to the Epiphone range. The marketing strategy used was that since the number of Gibson dealerships was limited by design, equivalent quality instruments under the Epiphone label could be offered for sale through other dealerships thus in principle increasing market share overall. This arrangement lasted until 1969 at which point Gibson decided to cease production of the high grade, U.S.A.-made Epiphone instruments in favour of a cheaper range of lower grade instruments still bearing the Epiphone label, but now sourced in Japan.

By the late 1970s, Epiphone production began moving to Korea, and by the mid-1980s, all Epiphones were Korean-built. Beginning in 1997, Epiphone moved its production to China and Indonesia. Since merging with Gibson, the brand has been used for a number of different guitars, some manufactured by Gibson itself in its own factories, and some manufactured by other companies such as Matsumoku under contract to Gibson and marketed under the Epiphone brand.

== Products ==
=== Guitars ===
==== Pre-Gibson era ====
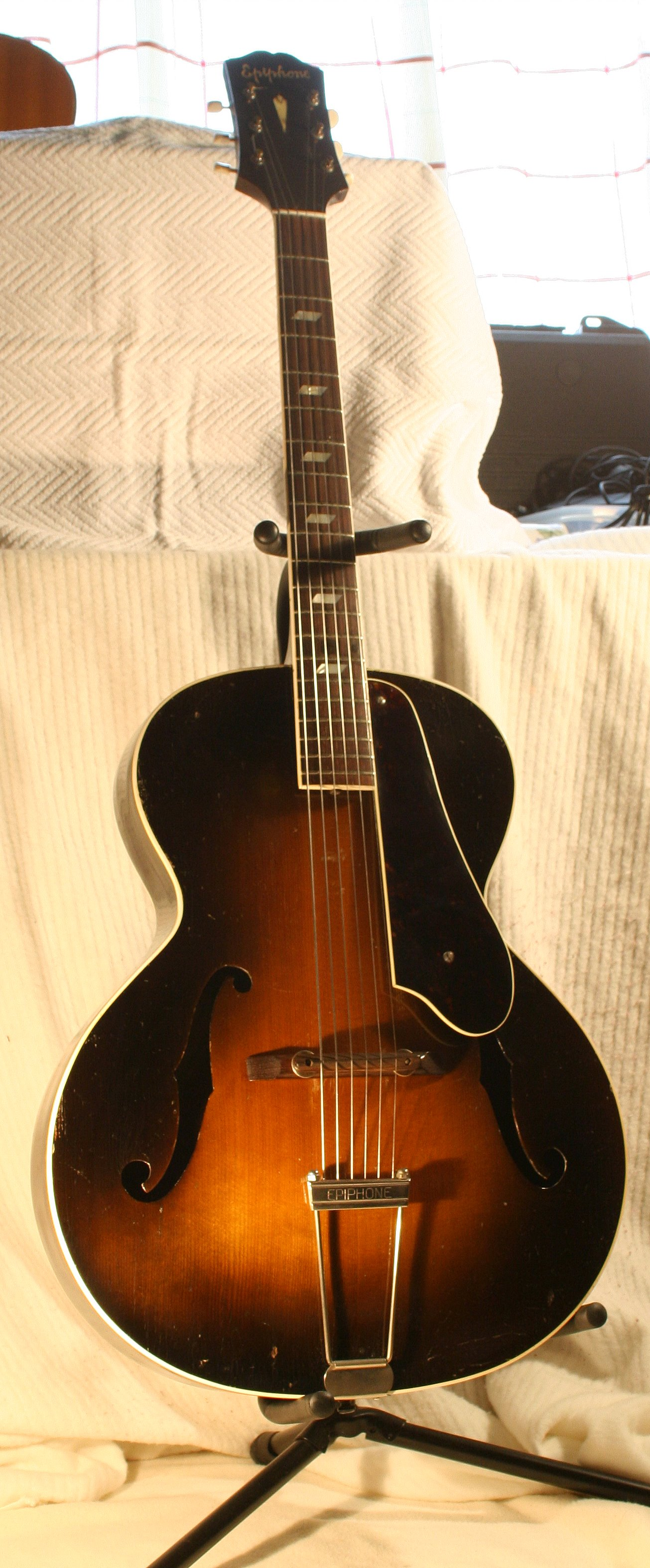
Epiphone Blackstone (non cutaway), 1947

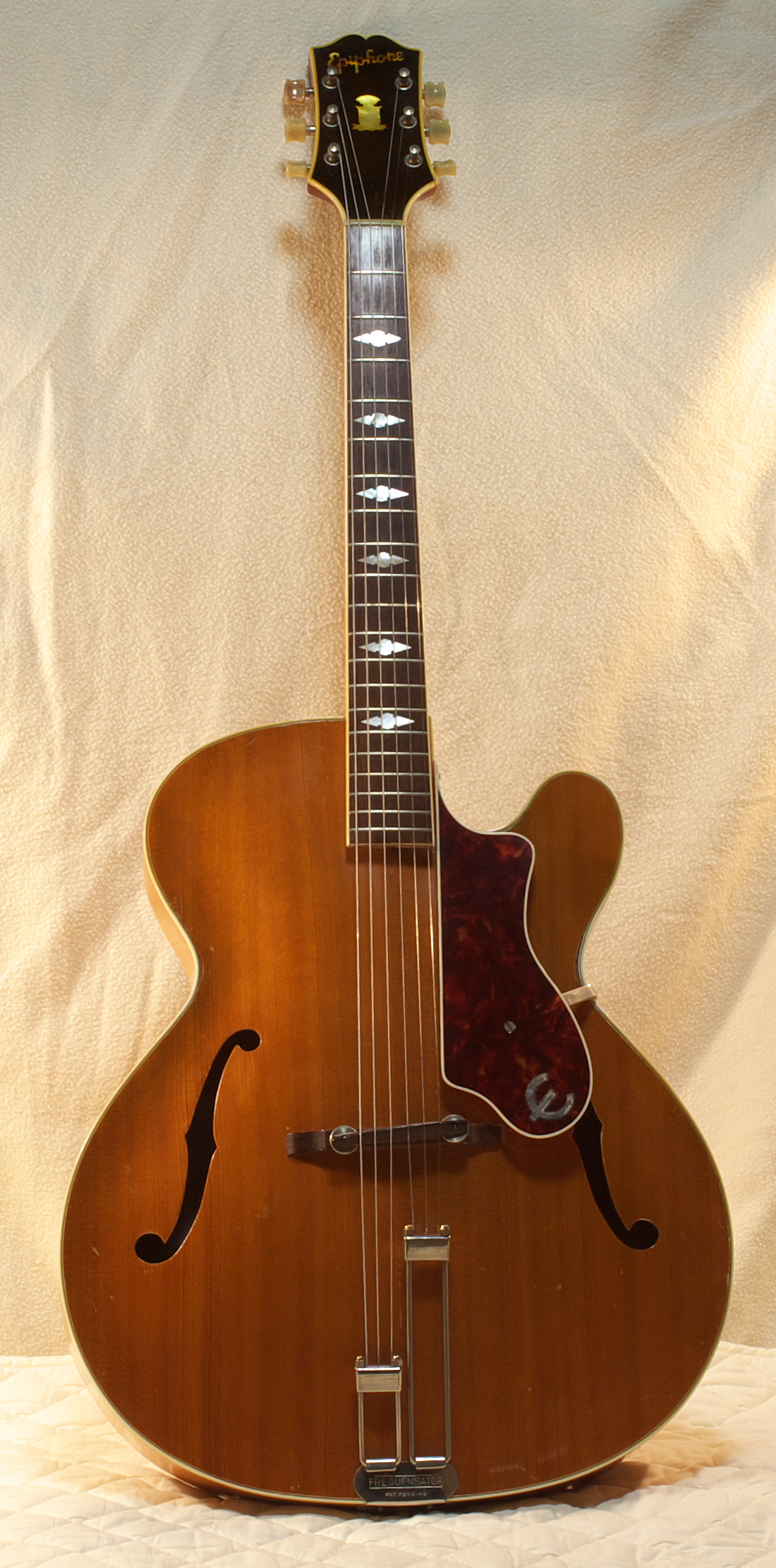
Epiphone Triumph Regent, 1951

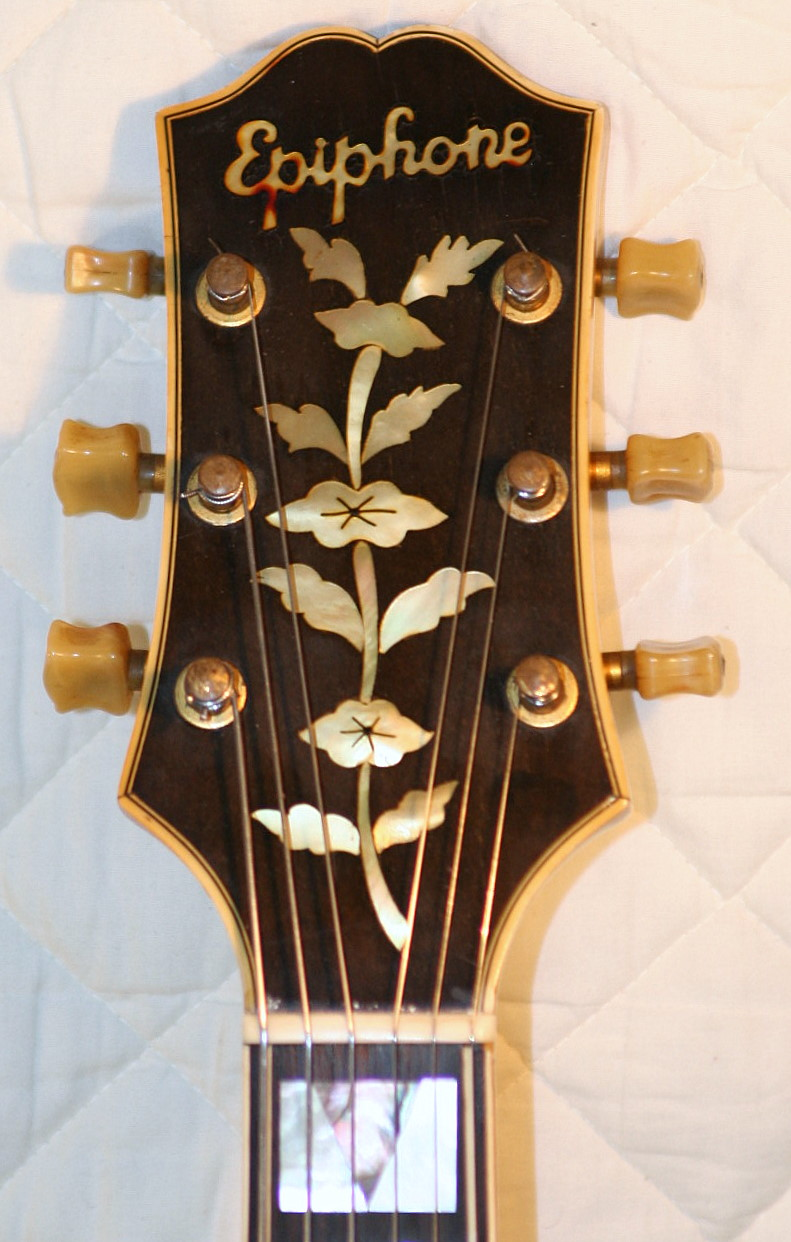
headstock of Epiphone Zephyr Deluxe, 1951

Epiphone's first foray into the guitar market came in around 1928, with the release of the "Recording" range, styled models A through E. These guitars featured an unusual asymmetric body shape with what was in effect a strongly sloping cutaway on the upper treble bout, and either a trapeze tailpiece or a pin bridge, together with pegheads and tuners reminiscent of the company's banjos. The cheapest model, the A, featured a flat top and back, the B had an arched back and a flat top, while the remainder had arched tops and backs; additionally, they appear to have been available in two different sizes. These guitars had a distinctive sound but were not very successful commercially, and are rarely seen today.

Commencing around 1931, Epiphone decided to release a new range of full body archtop guitars in direct competition with Gibson, the leading factory manufacturer of archtop guitars of the day. The newly announced "Masterbilt" series comprised the Deluxe (with its tenor version named the Empire), Broadway (tenor version the Bretton, later named the Broadway Tenor), Triumph (tenor version the Hollywood, later the Triumph Tenor), Royal, Spartan (tenor version the Regent, later the Spartan Tenor), Blackstone, Zenith (tenor version the Melody, later the Zenith Tenor), Olympic, and Beverly. Other models introduced a little later comprised the Emperor (1936), Byron (1938), Ritz (1941) and Devon (1951). These instruments were initially offered in acoustic, non-cutaway form, with cutaways appearing (often with the additional designation "Regent") from the late 1940s onwards, and with the addition of pickups, by the added designation of "Zephyr", thus an "Zephyr Emperor Regent" would indicate the (top of the line) Emperor model with added cutaway and pickups. Other archtops appeared solely in the amplified form, being the Zephyr, Century and Coronet (all 1939), Kent (1950) and a signature model named for Harry Volpe (1955).

Accompanying the archtop line were a range of flat top instruments, although these never acquired the cachet of their archtop companions. These included 2 Hawaiian models (the Madrid and the Navarre), plus the flat top FT 75 (introduced by 1935, discontinued 1942), FT 37 (1935-1942), FT 27 (1935-1941), FT De Luxe (1939-1942), FT 110, FT 79 and FT 45 (all 1942, all continued into Gibson era), FT 50 (1941-1950) and FT 30 (1941-1954, then reactivated in the Gibson era). Several cutaway flat top instruments were also made, designated the De Luxe Cutaway (also as the FT 210) and the Zephyr Cutaway. It seems that Epiphone used ladder- rather than X-bracing for the tops of their flat top models, which may account for their less success in the market than comparable instruments by the Martin and Gibson guitar companies.

==== Gibson (Kalamazoo) era ====
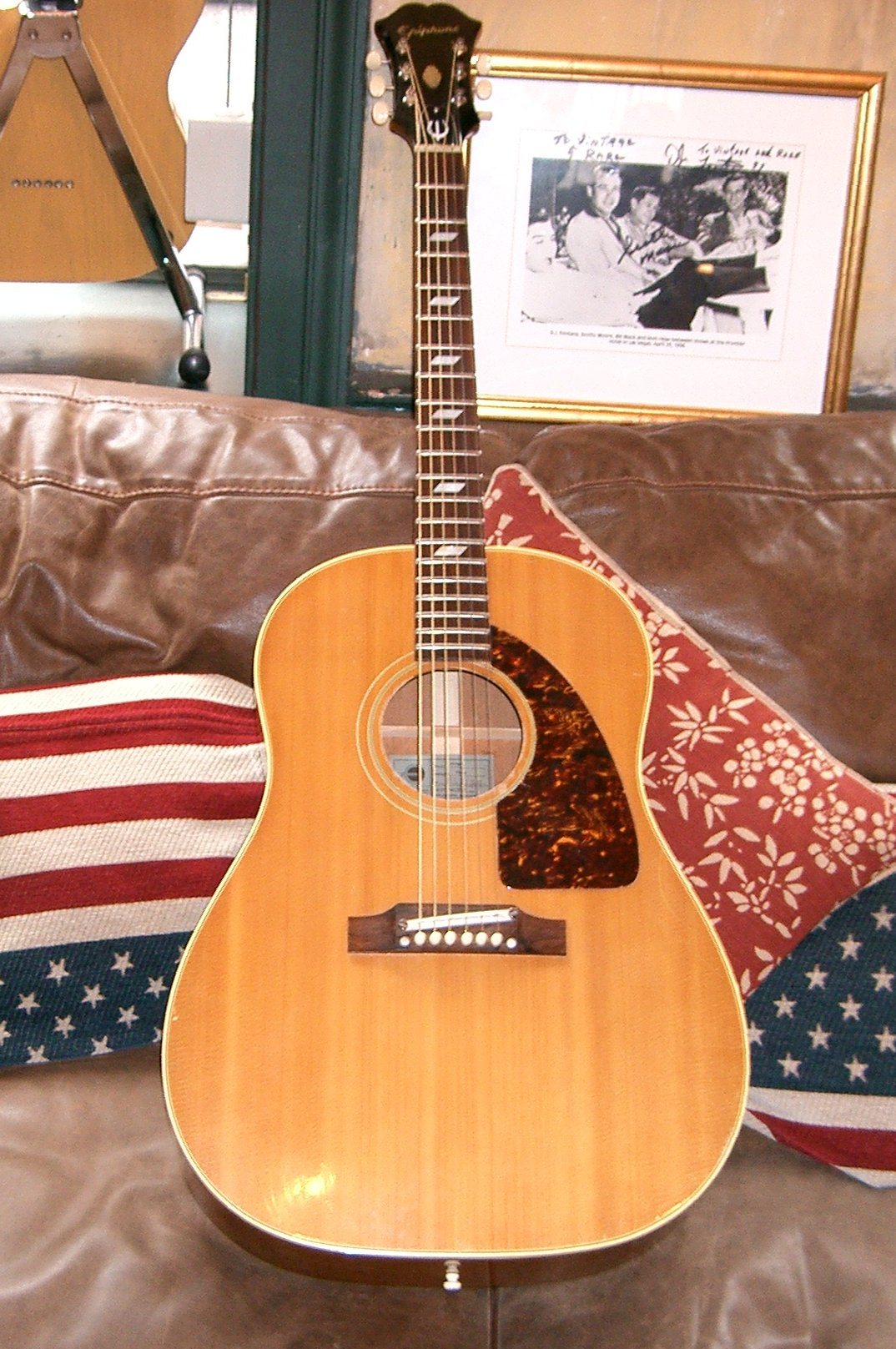
A Gibson (Kalamazoo) era Epiphone Texan (1966)

Following Epiphone's purchase by Gibson in 1957, the lines of both electric and acoustic guitars were considerably revamped, with the introduction of new thinline hollow-body (semi-acoustic) guitars, solidbody electric guitars, and a much improved range of flat-top acoustic guitars, incorporating elements of Gibson's own designs. The 1961 catalog shows that the Emperor, Deluxe, Triumph and Zenith were still available as acoustic archtops, the Emperor, Sheraton, Broadway, Zephyr and Century together with new models the Windsor, Casino and Sorrento as electric archtops, the new models Crestwood Custom, Wilshire, Coronet and Olympic as electric solidbodies, while the acoustic range comprised the Seville (a nylon string instrument), and the steel string Frontier (continuation of FT 110), Texan (continuation of FT 79), Cortez (continuation of FT 45) and Caballero (continuation of FT 30). Subsequent additions to these lines included the semi-acoustic Granada, Professional and Riviera models (all introduced 1962); as well as artist-endorsed models for Al Caiola (the "Caiola", introduced 1963) and Howard Roberts (1964), the latter with an unusual oval shaped soundhole. The Riviera was also available in a 12-string version (1965 onwards). New acoustic instruments comprised the Excellente, El Dorado, Troubador and Folkster, along with new "folk oriented" 12-strings the Bard (1962) and Serenader (1963); additions to the classical line comprised the Espana and Madrid (both 1962) and the Barcelona and Classic (both 1963). None of these instruments survived the termination of manufacturing of Epiphone instruments in Gibson's Kalamazoo plant in 1969, at least in their original form (subsequent Japanese models, some even re-using Kalamazoo-era model names, were of generally cheaper construction, for example using laminated woods and bolt-on necks as compared with their U.S.-made predecessors).

While some of the 1960s, U.S.A. built Epiphones had near-equivalents to models in the Gibson range of the day—for example the Riviera and Casino were very similar to the Gibson ES-335 and ES-330, respectively, the Frontier was somewhat similar to the Gibson Dove, while the Texan, Cortez and Cabellero were generally equivalent to the Gibson J-45, LG-2 and LG-0, respectively—others had no equivalent in the Gibson range, the Sheraton (semi-acoustic thinline version) and Excellente (acoustic) being top-of-the line instruments without any real parallel in the Gibson line/s of the day.

In England in the 1960s, several Epiphone models were brought to particular prominence via their use by The Beatles, Paul McCartney favouring a 1964 Epiphone Texan that he purchased in 1965 and used for the writing of "Yesterday" among other songs, while John Lennon, Paul McCartney and George Harrison all performed using Epiphone Casinos through much of the group's years of early commercial success.

==== Post-Kalamazoo era (1970s-current) ====
From the 1970s onwards, production of Epiphone guitars has largely taken place in Japan, Korea and China (refer section "Manufacturing", below), with a very small number of models also produced in the U.S.A. Since the 2000s, Epiphone branded guitars have fallen broadly into three categories. Firstly, Epiphone is used as a "budget brand" for Gibson, producing identically-named but lower-priced versions of popular Gibson models, such as the Epiphone Les Paul, which serves as a budget model comparable to the Gibson Les Paul. Secondly, Epiphone has also been used to brand models under alternate names, but are otherwise similar to more expensive Gibson-branded guitars, for example the Epiphone G-400 is functionally equivalent to the Gibson SG, and the Epiphone Dot is essentially a budget version of the Gibson ES-335. Thirdly are models which are exclusive to the Epiphone brand without equivalent models produced under the Gibson brand, such as the Epiphone Coronet.

As of January 2021, Epiphone was marketing guitars under several lines, including several categorized on their website as "inspired by Gibson" for models that serve as the budget Gibson version. Historically, hundreds of different models have borne the Epiphone brand, and many are available in the used guitar market.

=== Gibson-equivalent electric guitars ===
- Les Paul
- ES Series
  - ES-125TDC
  - ES-335
  - ES-339
- SG
- Flying V
- Firebird
- Explorer
- Thunderbird bass

=== Epiphone-exclusive electric guitars ===
- Archtop, hollow body and semi-hollow body guitars
  - Sheraton
  - Casino
  - Riviera
  - Wildkat
  - Emperor
  - Zephyr
  - Dot
- Solid body
  - Coronet
  - Wilshire
  - Crestwood
  - G-400
  - ET-270T
  - Les Paul and SG Special I, and II
  - Les Paul and SG Muse
  - Les Paul and SG Tribute E1 and Plus
- Bass guitars
  - Jack Casady bass
  - Viola bass (modeled after the Höfner 500/1)
  - Allen Woody Rumblekat bass
  - Embassy bass
  - AccuBass (A P-Bass configuration)
  - RockBass (A Jazz Bass configuration)
  - PowerBass (A P/J configuration)

=== Gibson-equivalent acoustic guitars ===
- Hummingbird 6- and 12-string models
- Dove
- J-200
- Gibson J-45 in full and single-cutaway models

=== Epiphone-exclusive acoustic guitars ===
- Texan
- Classical E1
- Songmaker
- Pro-1
- Masterbilt Series
- L'il Tex (travel-sized Texan)
- El Nino (travel-sized)
- Excellente (rare, only 139 ever made from 1963 until 1970, reissued in 2021 as part of the "Masterbilt" series)
- Frontier (made from 1958-1970, reissued briefly in the 1990s, and reissued again in 2020 as part of the "Masterbilt" series and in 2021 as part of the "Made in USA" collection)

=== Gallery of historic Epiphone models ===
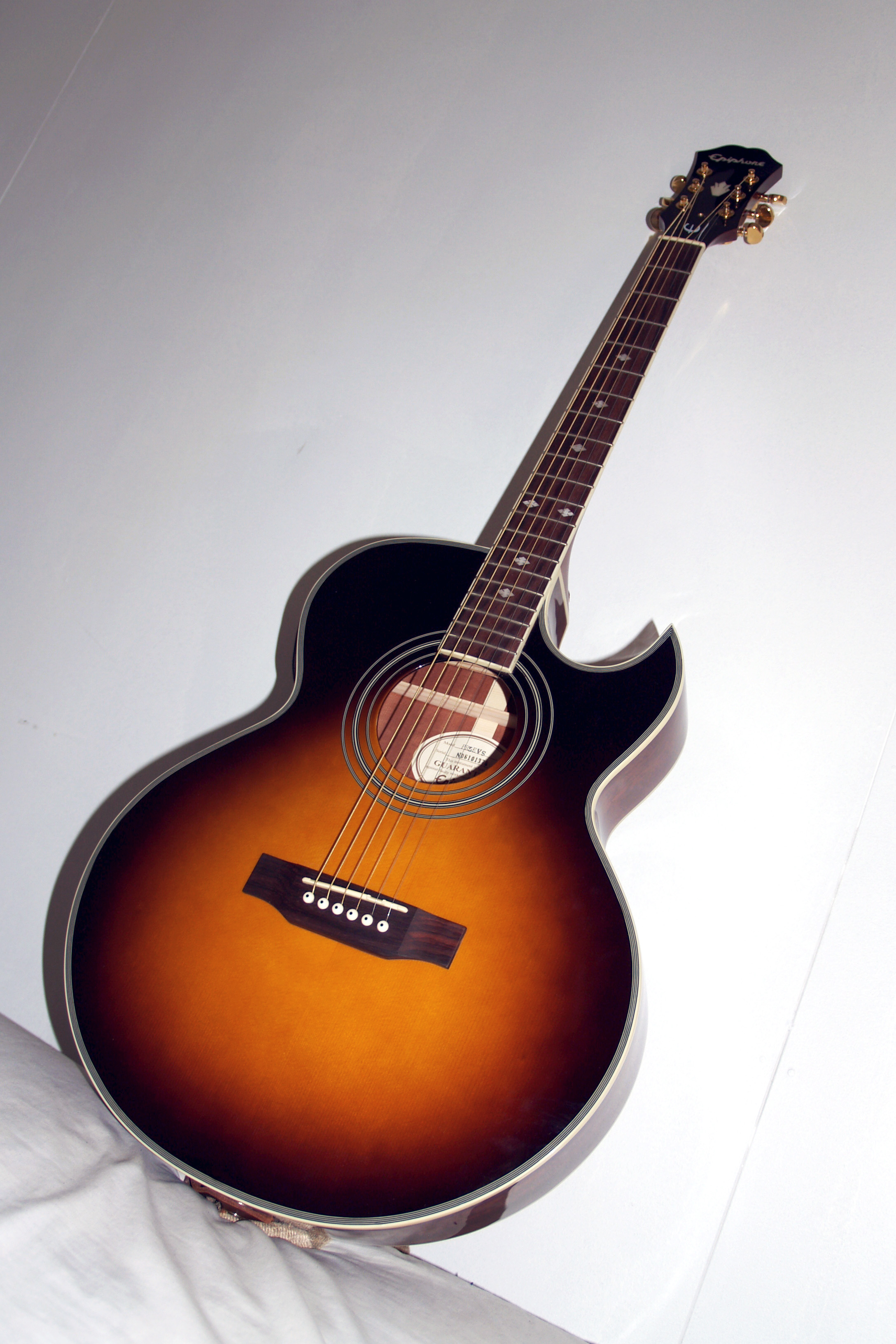
PR-5E VS Cutaway Acoustic.

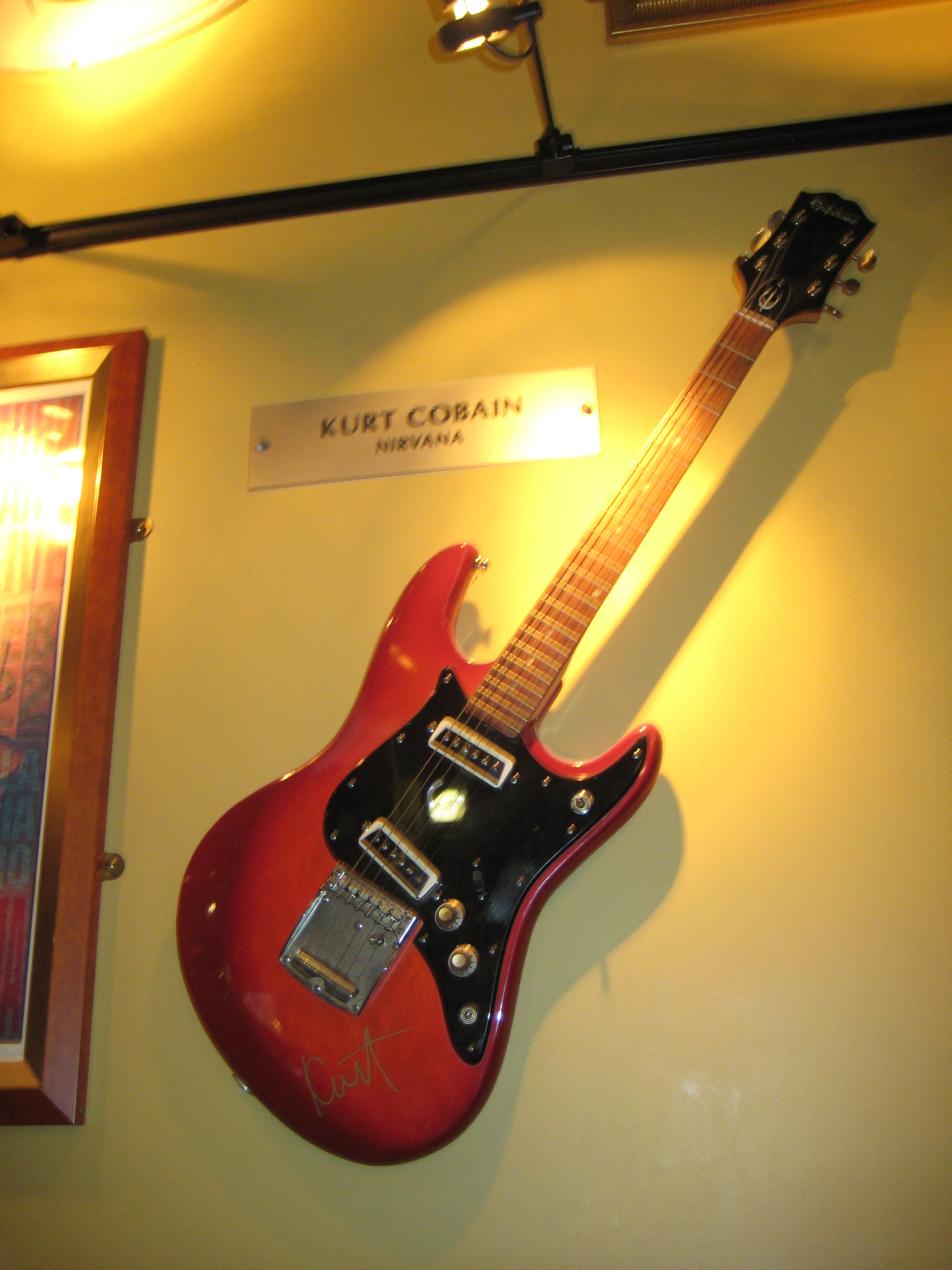
ET-270T with Kurt Cobain's autograph.

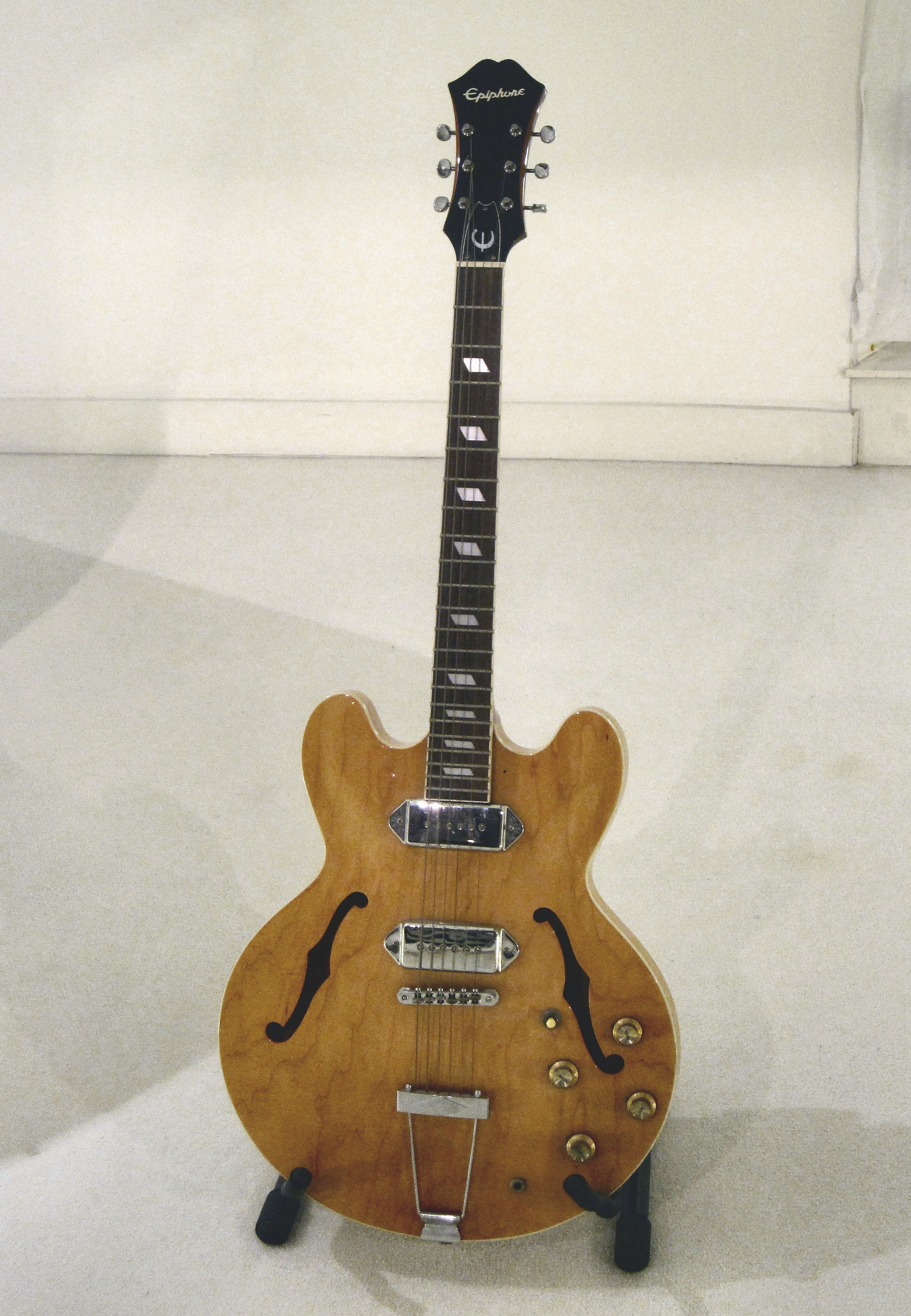
Casino model, used by John Lennon.

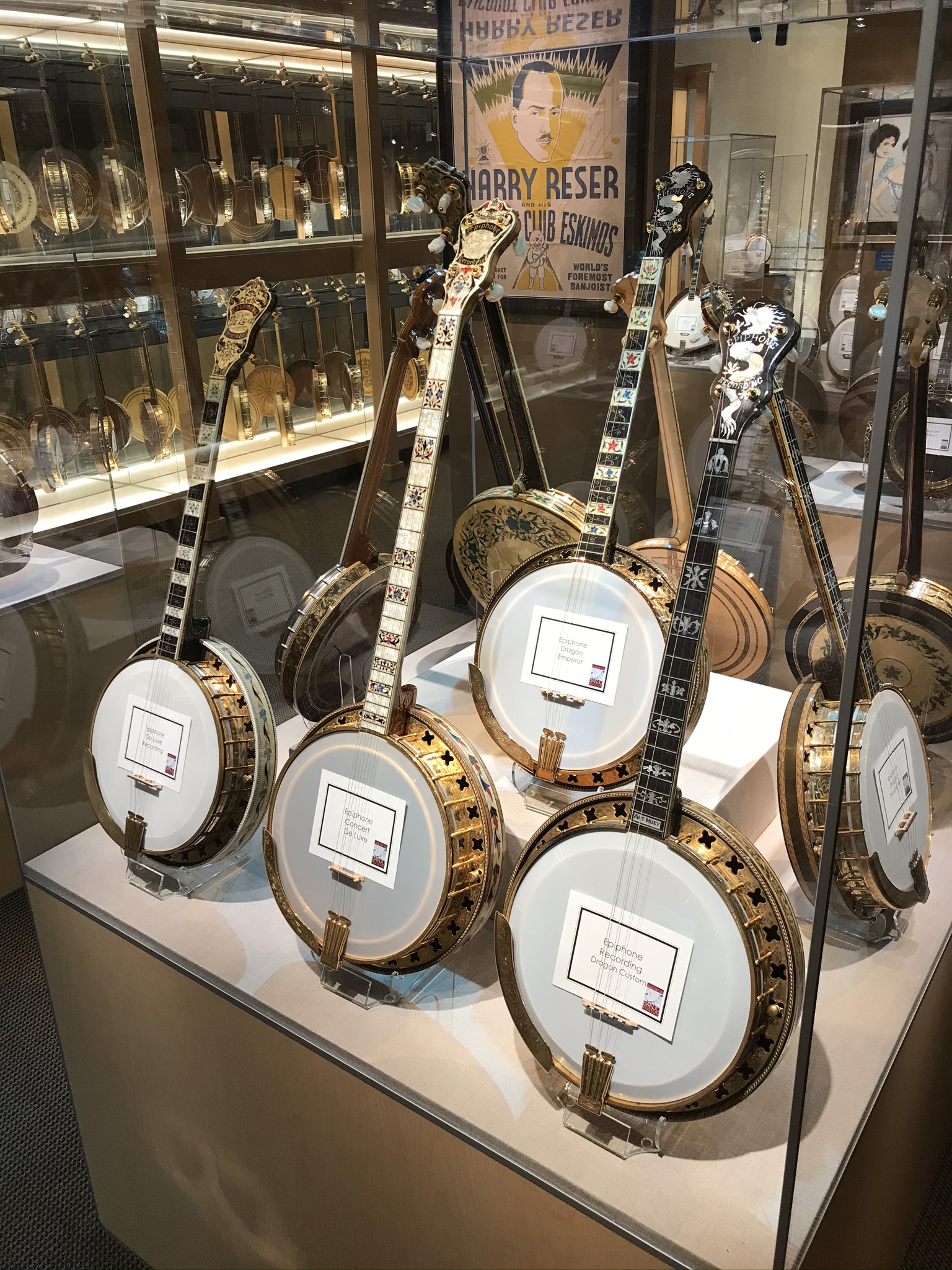
Jazz Age Epiphone banjos at the American Banjo Museum, “Recording”, “Concert Deluxe”, “Dragon Emperor”, “Recording Dragon Custom” models.

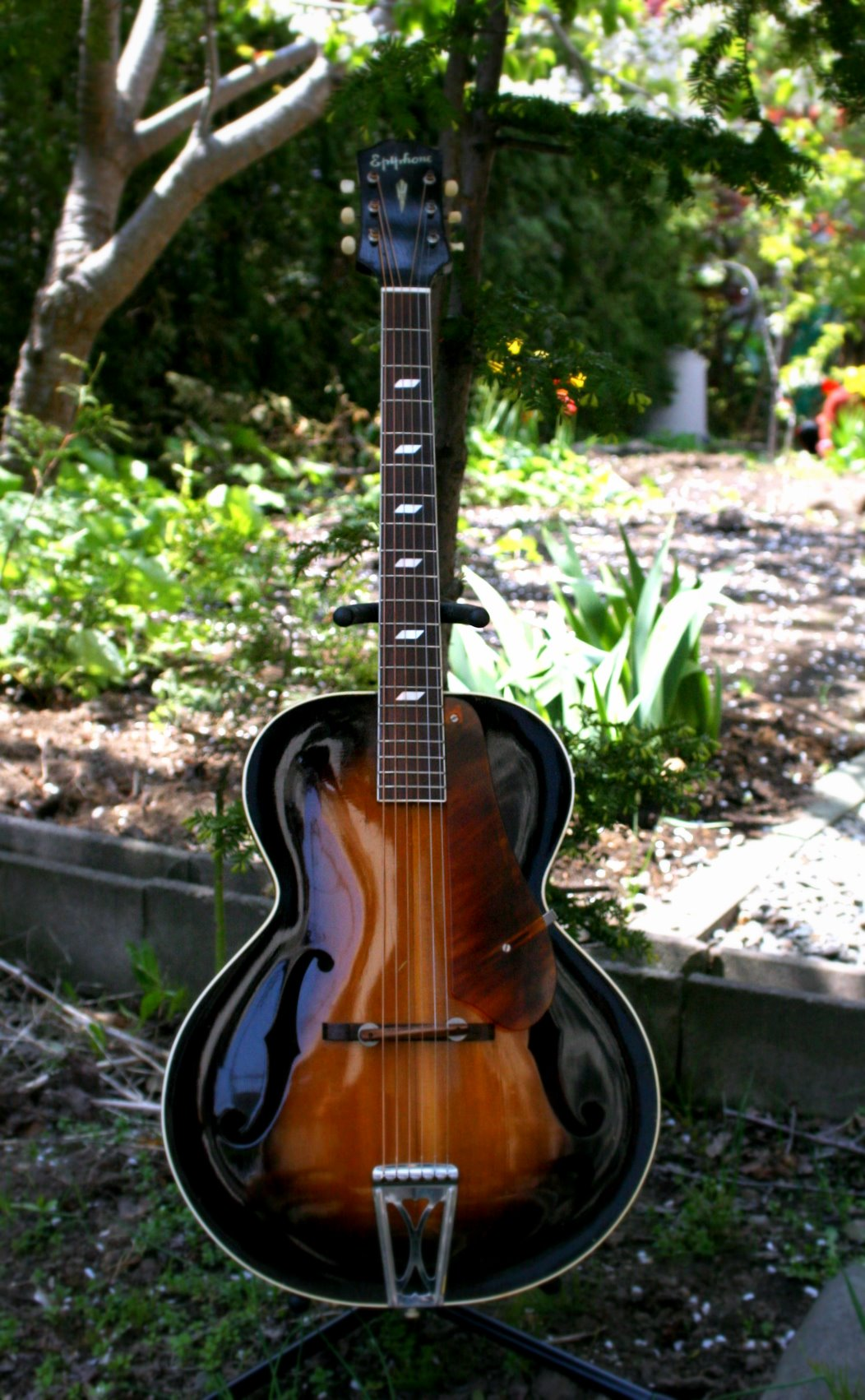
1945 Epiphone Blackstone archtop guitar, made in New York.

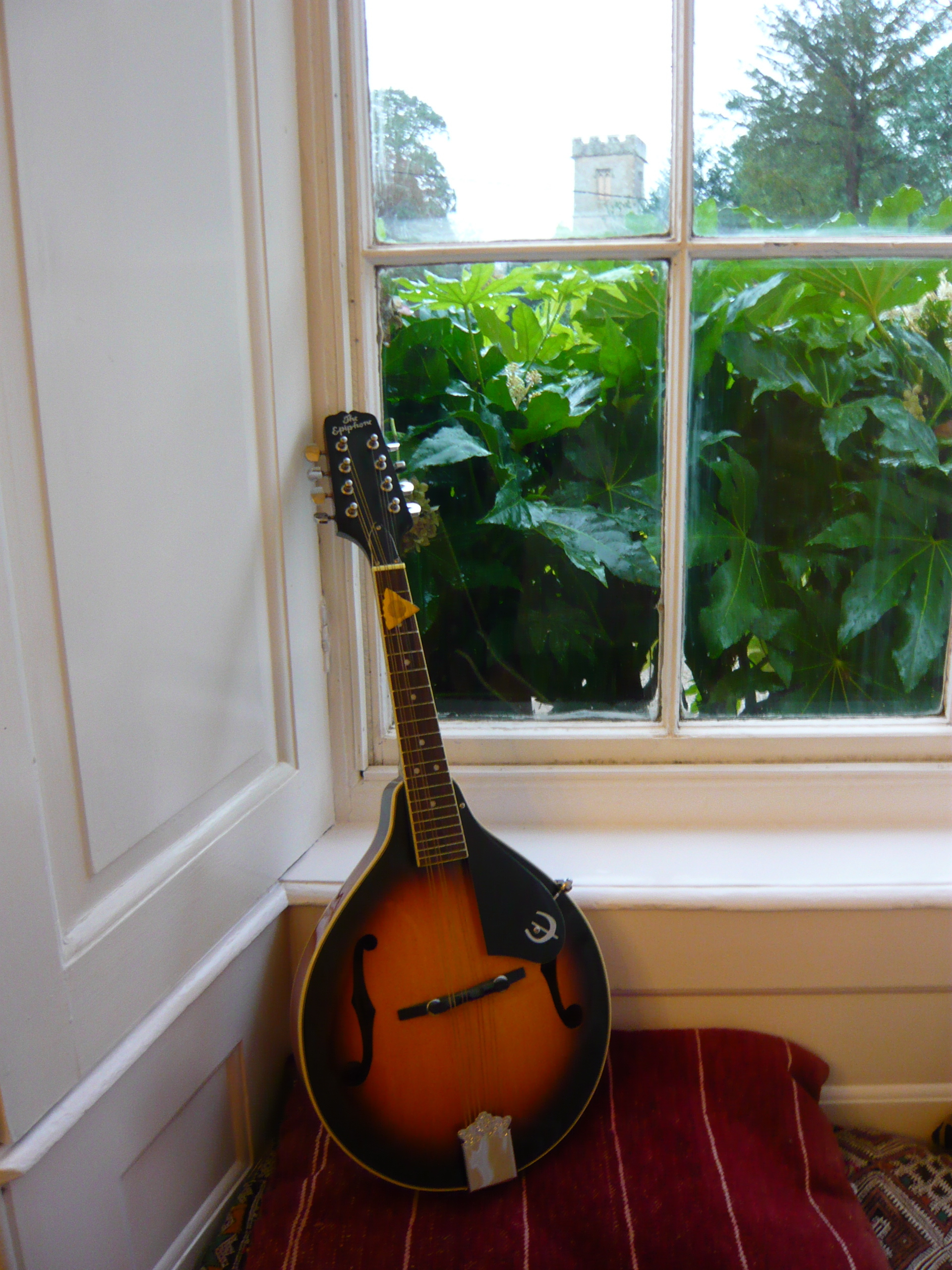
Modern Epiphone mandolin

=== Amplifiers ===
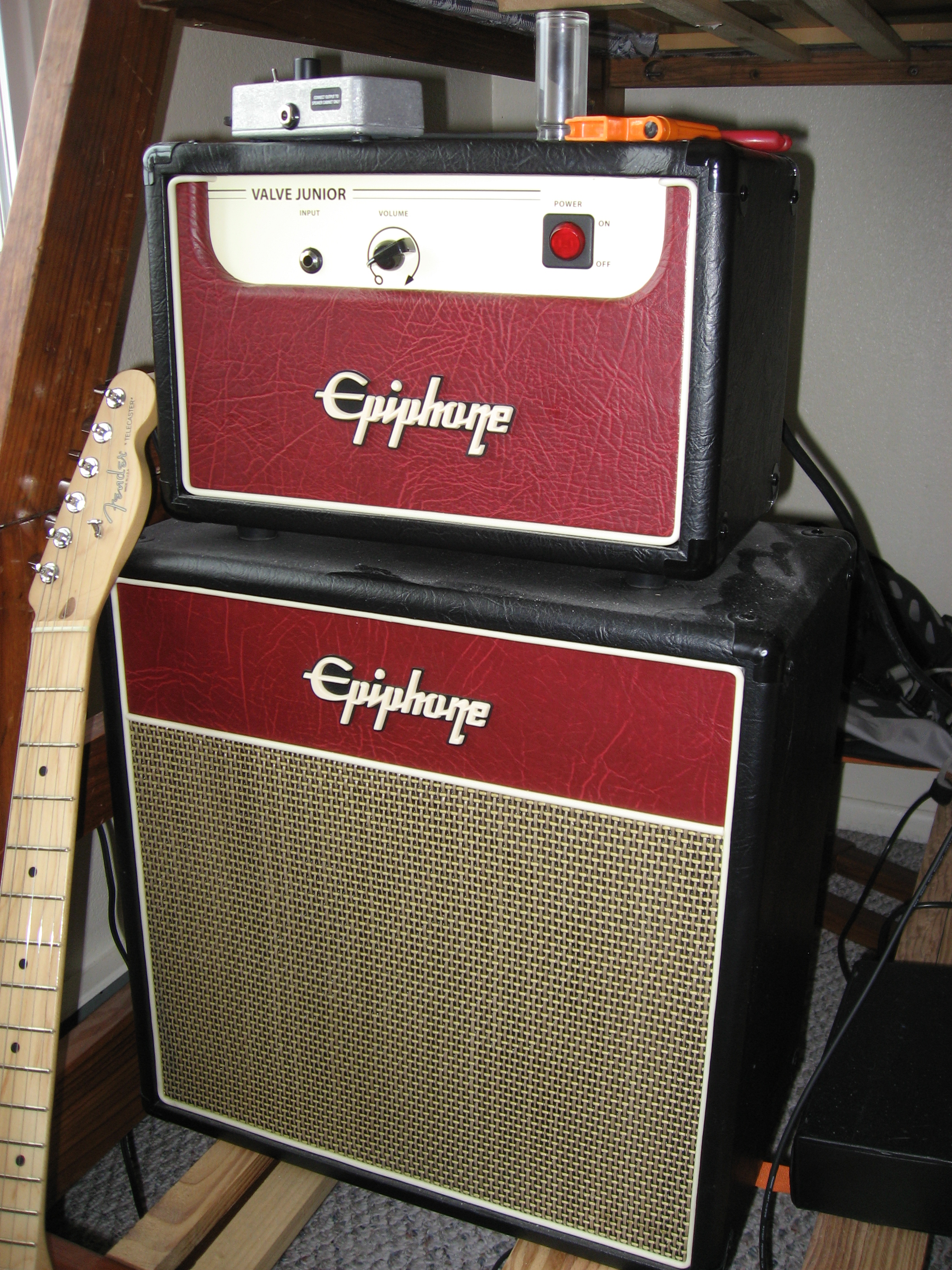
Valve junior stack

Epiphone began producing amplifiers in 1935 with the Electar Hawaiian Lap Steel Guitar Outfit. This outfit was an amplifier, case and lap steel guitar stand all rolled into one unit and was supplied by a suitcase manufacturer of the time. Electar Century and Zephyr amplifier models followed.

Gibson produced Epiphone amplifiers in the 1960s. These were copies or variations of Gibson and Fender amplifiers. They used a tube design, and some had reverb and tremolo. Gibson decided to launch a new line of Epiphone tube amplifiers in 2005 with models including the So Cal, Blues Custom, Epiphone Valve Junior and the solid state Triggerman range. The Valve Hot Rod and Valve Senior followed in 2009. The Valve Hot Rod is a 5 watt amp like the Valve Junior, but has a gain and reverb control. The Valve Senior offers 20 watts of power, with a full equalizer, gain, volume, reverb, and presence control.

As of 2012, Epiphone has ceased production of their line of amplifiers with the exception of the Player and Performance Pack practice amplifiers, available only in Epiphone's starter packages. These Amplifiers were under the Epiphone Electar brand. In 2014 the 1939 Electar Century 18-watt valve amplifier was reissued in an updated 75th anniversary Limited Edition.

== Manufacturing ==
=== United States ===
Epiphone instruments made between 1957 and 1970 were at Gibson facilities on Parsons Street and Eleanor Street in Kalamazoo, Michigan. Solid body guitars with flat tops and backs were made at the Eleanor Street plants (both Gibson and Epiphone). Some of these Epiphone instruments were effectively identical to the relevant Gibson versions, perhaps made with same timber, materials and components as the contemporary equivalent Gibson guitars. Epiphone also continued its production of archtop guitars using the same patterns and molds from Epi's New York era.

Some specific examples of Gibson-era Epiphone instruments from this period includes the Epiphone Sheraton (co-developed with the Gibson ES-335 & sharing its semi-hollow body, but with, Epiphone's pre-Gibson "Frequensator" tailpiece and "New York" mini-humbucker pickups, and significantly fancier inlays) and Sheraton II (replacing the Frequensator with Gibson's "stop-bar" tailpiece), the Epiphone Casino (similar to the Gibson ES-330), the Epiphone Caballero (similar to the Gibson LG-0), the Epiphone Cortez (similar to the Gibson LG-2), the Epiphone Frontier (similar to the Gibson Hummingbird), the Epiphone Olympic Special (similar to the Gibson Melody Maker), the Epiphone Sorrento (similar to the Gibson ES-125TC, except for a few cosmetic changes), and the Epiphone Texan (similar to the Gibson J-45, apart from a change in scale-length). The other Kalamazoo-made Epiphones had technical or cosmetic relationship with the similar Gibson version.

Several Epiphone guitars have been produced in the United States after 1971. The Epiphone Spirit and Special were produced in the early 1980s in Kalamazoo. In 1993, three historic Epiphone acoustic guitars, the Texan, Frontier, and Excellente, were produced by Gibson Acoustic in Montana. The Paul McCartney Texan was produced in 2005, and in 2009, the Epiphone Historic Collection was created, beginning with the 1962 Wilshire, built by Gibson Custom. Several other models, such as the Sheraton and John Lennon Casinos, were built in Japan and assembled and finished by Gibson USA.

=== Japan ===
In the early 1970s, Matsumoku began to manufacture Epiphone instruments in Japan with the production and distribution being managed by Aria, in cooperation with Gibson. At this time, Epiphone ceased production of all of its traditional designs and began manufacturing markedly less expensive guitars, many of which had less traditional bolt-on style necks and unspecified wood types. Some of these guitars had similar body shapes to traditional Epiphone and Gibson designs but had different names while other models retained certain model designations, such as the FT (Flat Top) guitars. Construction of these guitars differed greatly from past Epiphone models. For the first several years of production in Japan, Epiphone guitars were actually rebranded designs already produced by the Matsumoku Company.

By 1975, the Japanese market started seeing some of the more familiar designs and names being reintroduced. These guitars were of higher quality than that of the previous years of production in Japan and included models such as the Wilshire, Emperor, Riviera and Newport bass. These models were available to the Japanese market only. By 1976 new designs of higher quality were being introduced for export but did not include the current Japanese market models. Notable new designs from this era were the Monticello (Scroll Guitar), the Presentation (PR) and Nova series flat tops and the Genesis solid body guitar. By 1980, most Japanese-only designs were available for worldwide distribution. One in particular, the ES930J, was made at the famed Terada factory and was a superior instrument. The Matsumoku-made archtops, such as the Emperor, Riviera, Sheraton and Casino, were available into the mid-1980s.

=== Korea ===
From the 1980s, Epiphones were manufactured mainly in South Korea and Japan by contractors licensed by Gibson. One of the contractors was Samick, which also built instruments under license for other brands, and in its own name. The brand was primarily used to issue less expensive versions of classic Gibson models.

The guitars were constructed using different woods, generally only distantly related to true mahogany, and were fastened with epoxies rather than traditional wood glues. Gibson and Epiphone guitars all use Titebond resin glue, which is simple carpenters' wood glue, and were finished in hard, quick-to-apply polyester resin rather than the traditional nitro-cellulose lacquer used by Gibson. Epiphone guitars assembled or made in the US use lacquer finishes (except, perhaps, for SL models, made around 2000 and said to be finished "sans lacquer," in polyurethane), but those made outside of the US use a polyurethane finish because of pollution requirements. Those particular budget considerations, along with others such as the use of plastic nuts, and cheaper hardware and pickups, make for a more affordable instrument.

After 1996, Epiphone guitars were manufactured by Peerless Guitars Co., Ltd., a company established in 1970 in Busan, South Korea. Some models produced at the Peerless facility, including the 125th Anniversary instruments released in 1998, have been noted for their build quality and later became collectible. Other models from this period, such as the Sorrento, have also received positive assessments for their construction.

There is a controversial Epiphone guitar using "LU" serial number. It is said those guitars were made in Indonesia under license from Unsung Korea.

=== China ===
Between the Peerless period and the opening of the Qingdao plant, many Epiphones were constructed at the Zaozhuang Saehan plant in China. Guitars from his period are considered to be of high quality and, because of the relative rareness and quality factors, are sought after by Epiphone fans and collectors.

In 2004, Gibson opened a factory in Qingdao, China, which manufactures Epiphone guitars. With few exceptions, Epiphones are now built only in the Qingdao factory.

Also in 2004, Epiphone introduced a series of acoustic guitars named Masterbilt, after a line of guitars of the 1930s, which are built in the same factory.

=== Imperial Series and Elitist ===
During the early 1990s, Epiphone released a series called the Imperial Series. These were remakes of the classic Epiphone archtops of the 1930s and '40s. Each instrument was handmade in the FujiGen factory in Japan. This short-lived series was discontinued in 1993, after only 42 Emperors were made. Several other models, including De Luxe, Broadway and Triumph models, were also produced in varying quantities.

Production was moved back to Nashville and Bozeman for a similar limited run of instruments (250 each of Sheratons, Rivieras, Frontiers, Excellentes and Texans). These guitars were the "Nashville USA Collection" (archtops) and the "Anniversary Series" (acoustics). Contrary to popular information, this line was related to, but not part of the 1994 Gibson Centennial Series commemorating 100 years of the Gibson Guitar Corporation. The Nashville and Anniversary Collections were intended as reintroductions of original, USA built Epiphone models.

In 2002, Epiphone began producing a range of higher quality instruments under the "Elite Series" moniker which were built by Terada and FujiGen in Japan. After legal action by Ovation the name was changed to Elitist in 2003. As of 2008, all of the Elitist models have been discontinued with the exception of the Elitist Casino and the Dwight Trash Casino. The Epiphone Elitist guitars included features such as higher grade woods, bone nuts, hand-rubbed finishes, "Made in the USA" pickups and USA strings. Japanese domestic market Elitists used the Gibson Dove-wing headstock as opposed to the "tombstone" headstock used on exports.

== Serial numbers and factory codes ==
Current Epiphone serial numbers give the following information:

Korea

- I = Saein
- U = Unsung
- S = Samick
- P or R = Peerless
- K = Korea
- F = Fine
- C = Korea

China

- MR = CHINA
- DW = DaeWon
- EA = Gibson/QingDao
- EE = Gibson/QingDao
- MC = Muse
- SJ = SaeJung
- Z = Zaozhuang Saehan
- BW = China

Japan

- No letter or F = FujiGen
- J or T = Terada

Czech Republic

- B = Bohêmia Musico-Delicia

Indonesia

- CI = cort indonesia
- SI = Samick Indonesia

Example: SI09034853 SI = Samick Indonesia, 09 = 2009, 03 = March, 4853 = manufacturing number.

YYMMFF12345

- YY year
- MM month
- FF factory-code
- 12345 production#
- FACTORY NUMBER CODES—for some models starting in 2008, if serial # begins w/numbers
- [NOTE: The factories identified by these codes are based on patterns that forum members have observed. The numbers appear as the 5th and sixth digits in the serial number.]
- 11 = MIC sticker on a '08 Masterbilt
- 12 = DeaWon or Unsung (China—uncertainty remains as to which factory)
- 13 = Sticker: Made in China (Unknown factory; Epiphone LP-100)
- 15 = Qingdao (China) – electric
- 16 = Qingdao (China) – acoustic
- 17 = China – factory unknown MIC sticker on a J160E
- 18 = China – factory unknown found on one 2009 model bass
- 20 = DaeWon or Unsung (China—uncertainty remains as to which factory)
- 21 = Unsung, Korea
- 22 = ??? Korea (factory still unknown)
- 23 = ??? Indonesia (factory still unknown, probably Samick,)
- I = Indonesia (this letter has appeared as the 5th digit on two authentic new models made in Indonesia
