= Epiphone G-400 =

Solid body electric guitar model

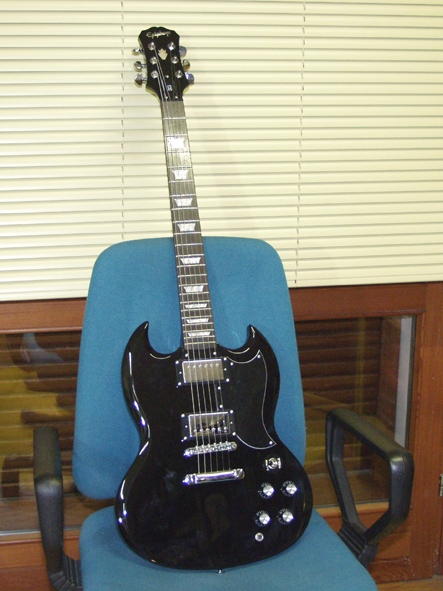
- Manufacturer: Epiphone
- Period: 1989–2019

Construction
- Body type: Solid
- Scale: 24.75"

Woods
- Body: Mahogany, Korina
- Neck: Mahogany, Korina
- Fretboard: Rosewood

Hardware
- Bridge: Tune-o-Matic with stopbar tailpiece, Maestro Tremolo
- Pickup(s): 2 "Alnico Classic" humbuckers with chrome covers and Alnico V magnets

Colors available
- Standard: ebony and cherry. Faded: worn brown and worn cherry. Deluxe: vintage sunburst. Other: Guitar Center sells an exclusive G-400 in alpine white finish, Pelham Blue

The G-400 (or sometimes G400) is an Epiphone solid body electric guitar model that was produced as a more modestly priced version of the famous Gibson SG. Epiphone is a subsidiary of Gibson and manufactured the G-400 and other budget models at a lower cost in Asia. Visually and ergonomically, it is almost identical to a 1962 SG. Since 2020, the G-400 model number is no longer used, as Asian-made, Epiphone-branded versions now use the same SG model name as US-made Gibson guitars. Now the successor to Epiphone SG Muse, the original Epiphone guitar.

== History ==
Introduced in 1989 after Epiphone production moved to Korea in cooperation with the Samick Corporation, the G-400 has been in continuous production for thirty years.

Upon introduction, it featured dot fretboard inlays, two open-coil humbuckers, green key tuners with the Epiphone logo stamped on their backs, a differently shaped truss rod cover with "Gibson" printed vertically, black "speed" knobs, and "narrow-open Book" headstock. By 1990, the G-400 was sporting the modern "clipped-ear" headstock with no holly inlay

In 1996, several features of the G-400 were changed. These changes included black "top hat" knobs with silver inserts, trapezoidal fretboard inlays, chrome covers on the humbuckers, and a "holly" headstock inlay.

Until 2002, the vast majority of G-400s were built in Korea by the Samick Corporation. Now, most G-400s are built in Epiphone's Qingdao, China plant.

In 2002, Epiphone began using Grover tuners on the G-400. In 2004, the truss rod cover was changed to the current shape with "SG" printed on it. In 2005, the logo ink stamped on limited edition models was changed. In 2009, the G-400 (along with several other Epiphone models) made the switch from chrome-plated hardware to nickel-plated hardware. Also, the neck was changed to a "slim taper" profile. In 2012, Epiphone introduced the G-400 Pro with Alnico Classic PRO™ 4-wire humbuckers.

=== Woods ===
The Epiphone G-400 is made of Philippine/Indonesian mahogany (more commonly known as Luan, Lauan or Meranti, botanic genus Shorea which has 196 subspecies), which is not actually related to the true mahogany species native to the neotropics. In 2005, Epiphone began putting thin veneers of African mahogany on the front and back of the Cherry finished G-400s. G-400 "Vintage" worn cherry / worn brown models manufactured in Korea from 2002 to 2005 (UnSung and SaeIn plants, serial numbers starting with U or I) have solid three-piece bodies made from Nyatoh (palaquium spp.) without a veneer.

== Features ==
The design of the G-400 follows that of the Gibson SG. Features include dual pointed cutaways, smaller pickguard (but in some cases, such as the 1966 model or any limited-edition model, there is still a large pickguard), set neck, trapezoidal fingerboard inlays (late 80s and early 90s models as well as the 1961 reissue models had dot inlays), dual humbucker pickups, and beveled mahogany body. The biggest visual differences from the Gibson SG are the Epiphone headstock and wood-bound neck. The standard G-400, not limited edition, is available in two finishes: ebony and cherry. The Faded G-400 comes in worn brown and worn cherry. In addition, new models now have Grover-brand machine heads.

== Variants ==
The G-400 is available in many models, including G-400, Pro, Deluxe, Deluxe Flametop, Custom, Vintage, '66 Limited edition, SG Special, Tony Iommi Signature, Gothic and an Alpine White EMG pickup outfitted Limited Edition, the latter of which is very rare.

The Japanese-made Elitist G-400 has a slightly different shaped headstock than most Epiphone models.

=== Faded G-400 ===
The Faded G-400 features:

- Alnico Classic humbuckers
- Nickel hardware
- Licensed Grover tuners
- Mahogany neck and body
- Set neck construction
- Rosewood fingerboard with "trapezoid" inlays
- 24.75" scale
- 1.68" nut width
- Colors available: Worn Cherry and Worn Brown.

=== G-400 ===
The G-400 features:

- Alnico Classic humbuckers
- Nickel hardware
- chrome tuners
- Mahogany body with African mahogany
- "Slim taper" set mahogany neck
- Rosewood fingerboard with "trapezoid" inlays
- 24.75" scale
- 1.68" nut width
- Also available left-handed (since 2003, Cherry finish only)
- Colors available: Ebony, Cherry, Vintage White (discontinued), Worn Brown, and Metallic Light Blue (discontinued).

=== G-400 Custom ===
The G-400 Custom (introduced 2000, discontinued 2011) features:

- Three Alnico Classic humbuckers
- Gold hardware
- Licensed Grover tuners
- Set Mahogany neck and body
- Neck and headstock binding
- Rosewood fingerboard with "block" inlays
- 24.75" scale
- 1.68" nut width
- Colors available: Antique Ivory and Ebony.

=== G-400 Deluxe ===
The G-400 Deluxe features:

- Alnico Classic humbuckers
- Nickel hardware
- Licensed Grover tuners
- Mahogany neck
- Mahogany body with flamed maple veneer
- Set neck construction
- Rosewood fingerboard with "trapezoid" inlays
- 24.75" scale
- 1.68" nut width
- Colors available: Vintage Sunburst.

=== Tony Iommi G-400 ===
The Tony Iommi G-400 features:

- Gibson USA Tony Iommi humbuckers
- Black chrome hardware
- Licensed Grover tuners
- Mahogany body
- "Slim taper" set mahogany neck
- Tony Iommi's signature screened on truss rod cover
- Strap button relocated to top horn
- 24 fret rosewood fingerboard with mother of pearl "cross" inlays
- 24.75" scale
- 1.68" nut width
- Also available left-handed
- Colors available: Ebony.

== Limited Edition Models ==
Several Limited Edition models have been produced for different licensed Gibson/Epiphone dealers.

=== G-400 1966 Reissue ===
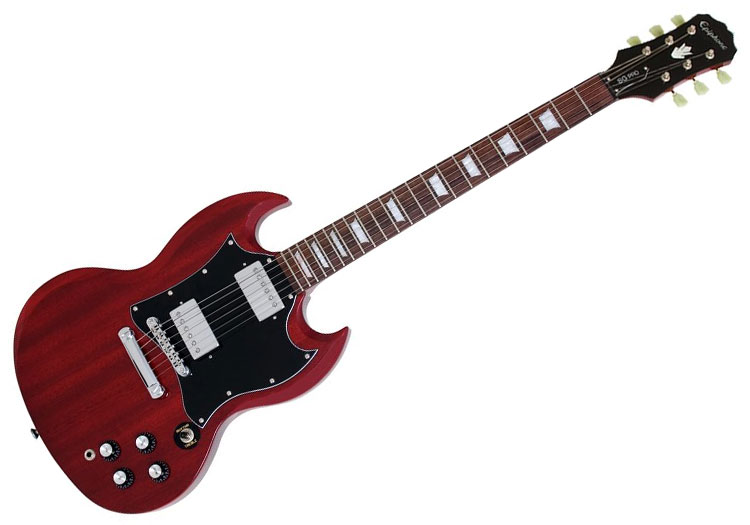
Epiphone G-400 1966 Reissue in Heritage Cherry

The G-400 1966 Reissue features:

- Neck Pickup Alnico Classic neck humbucker
- Bridge Pickup Alnico Classic Plus bridge humbucker
- Bridge Locktone Tune-O-Matic
- Tailpiece Stopbar
- Controls Neck pickup: 1-Volume with push/pull coil split, 1-Tone/ Bridge pickup: 1-Volume with push pull coil split, 1-Tone w/full-size 500K O potentiometers
- Hardware Nickel
- Colors Ebony, Heritage Cherry, Silverburst, Wood Grain, Alpine White and Pelham Blue
- Tuners Epiphone and Wilkinson Delux 14:1 ratio
- Neck Mahogany Set Neck
- Fingerboard rosewood(ebony on some models), 22 fret
- Body Mahogany
- Weight 6.9 pounds
- Strings D'addario 10, 13, 17, 26, 36, 46
- "Batwing" style pickguard

(Note: the neck joint used on this model is incorrect for a '66 SG)

=== G-400 w/EMGs ===
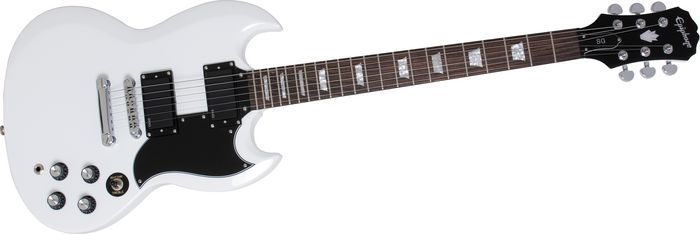
Epiphone G-400 with EMG pickups

The G-400 w/EMGs features:

- EMG 81/85 humbuckers
- Nickel hardware
- Licensed Grover tuners
- Mahogany neck and body
- Set neck construction
- Rosewood fingerboard with "trapezoid" inlays
- Colors available: Alpine White.

=== G-400 '65 Reissue w/Maestro Vibrola ===
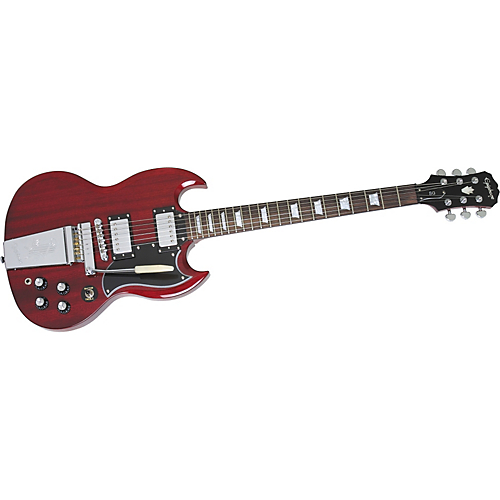
Epiphone G-400 '65 Reissue w/ Maestro Vibrola in Cherry

The G-400 '65 Reissue w/Maestro Vibrola features:

- Alnico Classic humbuckers
- Chrome hardware
- Licensed Grover tuners
- Mahogany neck and body
- Set neck construction
- Rosewood fingerboard with "trapezoid" inlays
- Maestro Vibrola tailpiece
- Colors available: Cherry, Ebony w/ gold hardware, Pelham Blue.

=== G-400 Korina (year 2000 spec.) ===
The G-400 Korina features:

- Alnico Classic humbuckers
- Gold hardware
- Korina body
- Set mahogany neck
- Rosewood fingerboard with "trapezoid" inlays
- Colors available: Natural.

=== SG G-400 PRO Deluxe Limited Edition "1961" ===
Specs and Features

- 1960s Era “SG” with Mahogany body and neck
- Exclusive Cobalt Fade Blue, Candy Apple Red, Metallic Gold, and Silverburst finishes
- Epiphone Alnico Classic PRO 4-wire humbuckers with coil-splitting
- Top Material: AAA Flame Maple Veneer
- Body Material: Mahogany
- Neck Material: Mahogany
- Neck Shape: "1960s" SlimTaper; D - Profile
- Neck Joint: Glued-In, Set Neck
- Scale Length: 24.75"
- Fingerboard Material: Pau Ferro with pearloid "Trapezoid" inlays
- Fingerboard Binding: 1 Ply Binding / Cream
- Fingerboard Radius: 12"
- Pickguard: 4-layer (Black/White/Black/White)
- Tuners: Wilkinson ™ Vintage Classics 18:1 tuners
- Hardware: Nickel
- Controls: Neck Pickup Volume with push/pull coil-splitting, Neck Pickup Tone
- Bridge Pickup Volume with push/pull coil-splitting, Bridge Pickup Tone
- Knobs: Premium Top Hats with metal inserts
- Bridge: LockTone™ Tune-o-matic/Stopbar
- Frets: 22 Medium jumbo
- LockTone™ Tune-o-matic bridge and Stopbar tailpiece

== Notable user ==
- Jus Oborn (Electric Wizard)
