= Epiphone Valve Junior =

Small 5 watt class A electric guitar amplifier

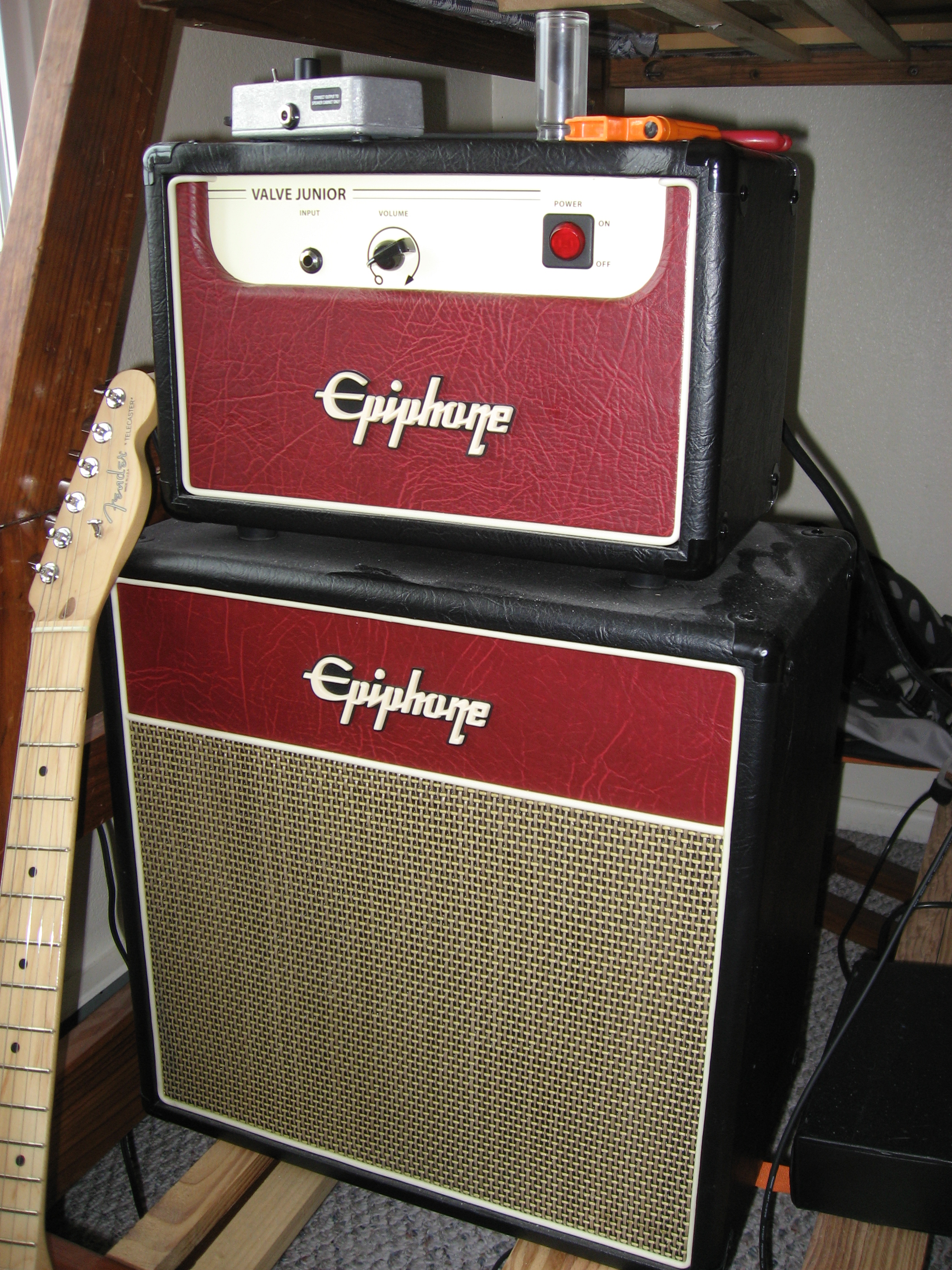
Epiphone valve junior half stack model

The Epiphone Valve Junior is a small 5 watt class A electric guitar amplifier. It is relatively inexpensive, and has relatively few features, but is somewhat popular in the DIY community for modification.

== Specifications ==
- Available as an 8 in (200 mm) speaker combo version or as a head only version.
- Weight: 20.9 lb (9.5 kg)
- Dimensions: 14.6 in × 8.7 in × 15.1 in (370 mm × 220 mm × 380 mm)
- Made in China

== History ==
The Epiphone Valve Jr. version 1 combo was released in 2005 as a part of Epiphone's line of amplifiers. In January 2006 a head version was released and also a version 2 combo. In June 2007 an updated head version and a version 3 combo were released. The first Epiphone Valve Juniors (version 1) were only combo amplifiers and received only a fair reception, due to such problems as buzzing and hum caused by the AC filament voltage. Epiphone then released a head version, correcting these issues and changed the AC filament voltage to DC voltage. Version 2 combos also featured these modifications. The version 1 and version 2 combos feature an 8 in (200 mm) 4 Ω ceramic speaker.

Epiphone released Combo version 3 and a newer version of the head with higher retail prices and feature a variety of tube brands based on availability including Electro-Harmonix, JJ, and Sovtek. The newer versions of the head and version 3 combos feature updated transformers with 4, 8, and 16 Ω outputs and the version 3 combos feature an 8 in (200 mm) 16 Ω Eminence Lady Luck speaker. In 2007, Epiphone released a speaker cabinet that can be used with the Epiphone Valve Junior, featuring a 12 in (300 mm) 16 Ω Eminence Lady Luck speaker rated at 70 W RMS.

- Combo version 1 has front panel stripes that run along the centre of the front panel and has a 4 Ω output only and an AC filament voltage.
- Combo version 2 has front panel stripes that run along the top of the front panel and has a 4 Ω output only and a DC filament voltage.
- Combo version 3 has front panel stripes that run along the top of the front panel and has 4, 8, and 16 Ω outputs and a DC filament voltage.
- Head only versions have 4, 8, and 16 Ω outputs.
- Early versions mainly have Sovtek tubes and later versions have a variety of tubes such as JJ, EH and Sovtek tubes.

== Modifications ==
The Epiphone Valve Junior has become very popular to modify in the amp modding community; numerous online guides and kits are available for this purpose. Some sites offer kits to match the gain characteristics of Marshall, Fender and Vox amplifiers.

These kits often do not include a bridge rectifier to convert the version 1 AC filament supply voltage to DC, instead they suggest twisting the AC leads together to cancel the generated electromagnetic fields, a technique used in twisted-pair Ethernet cable to eliminate crosstalk.

== Valve Junior Hot Rod ==
A somewhat limited edition of the Valve Junior head was produced by Epiphone, dubbed the Valve Junior Hot Rod. It was released as a response to the extensive number of modifications that were being applied to the regular Valve Junior. The circuitry was altered to include a second 12AX7 preamp tube, a gain control, and a spring reverb in addition to the single volume control, as well as a standby switch to preserve tube life. Thanks to a dual function jack on the amp's rear panel, the Hot Rod can also be used as a standalone reverb unit to be used in conjunction with another amplifier's input or effects loop. In this function, the gain knob becomes the unit's dwell control, the volume knob retains its level function, and the reverb knob becomes the mixture control. When used as a reverb unit, the Hot Rod does not need to have a speaker connected to its output jacks because an internal "dummy load" activates automatically when the Reverb output jack is used.

== Serial numbers ==
The first 4 digits of the serial number are the date code MMYY (MM = month, YY = year). Version 2 Valve Juniors have date codes starting at "0106" January 2006 up to June 2007 when version 3 was released.

== See also ==
- Epiphone
- Gibson
