= Epiphone Texan =

Model of acoustic guitar

Epiphone FT-79 (Texan)
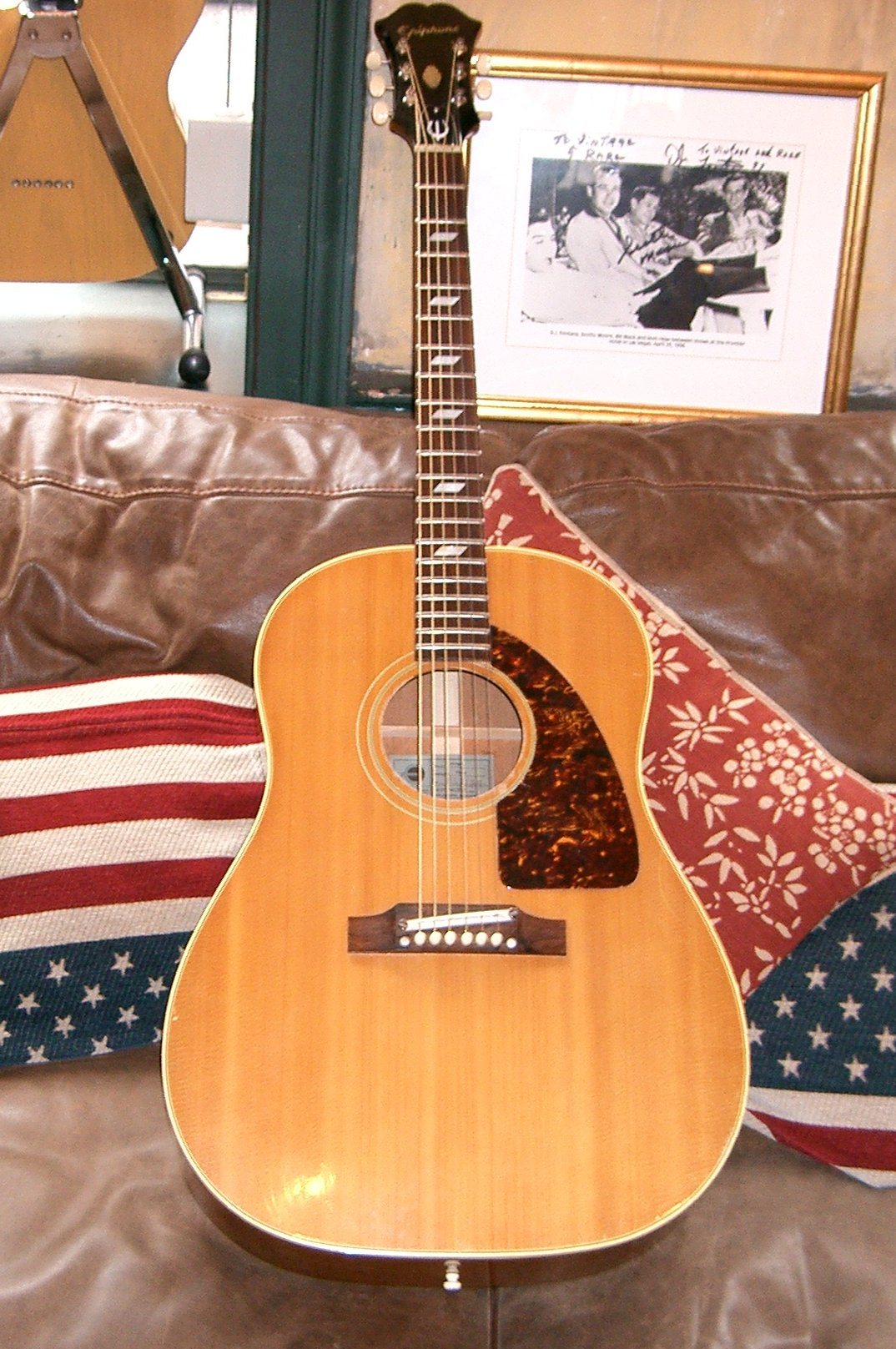
- An original 1966 Epiphone Texan
- Manufacturer: Epiphone
- Period: 1942–1970, 2006, 2010–present

Construction
- Neck joint: Set neck

Woods
- Body: Mahogany
- Neck: Mahogany, 25.5" scale
- Fretboard: Rosewood

Colors available
- Natural, Sunburst, Vintage Cherryburst

The Epiphone Texan is an acoustic flattop guitar of the (advanced) Jumbo type. Recent models have an integrated light-weight internal electric pickup fitted; The original model was acoustic only.

== History ==
The FT-79 was produced by the Epiphone company starting in 1942. After Gibson bought Epiphone in 1957, the Texan was produced in Kalamazoo, Michigan until 1970. There have been numerous reissues of the Texan since their primary production period in the 1960s.

The original, New York made Epiphone FT-79 is quite a different guitar. It was originally a walnut bodied guitar. Its body was a smaller jumbo model and is comparable to the later Guild F-47 (the Guild Guitar Company was started by ex-Epiphone employees after the company left New York). After the takeover by Gibson, the FT-79 type designation was retained, but the body shape changed to one that resembled the slope-shouldered Gibson J-45 (but that guitar has a shorter 24.75" scale length, compared to the 25.5" of the Texan).

The 1942 model had rectangular block fingerboard inlays and the original stick-pin Epiphone logo. In 1954 the model had parallelogram fingerboard inlays and a vertical oval peghead inlay. In the late 1940s to mid 1950s the FT-79 body was made with maple. In 1958 the Gibson-made FT-79 had 'Texan' added to the type name, the shape was changed as mentioned above, the epsilon 'slashed C' Epiphone logo was added to the pick guard and the truss rod cover, and the tuner knobs were changed to white plastic. In the late 1950s the body wood was changed to mahogany. All Texans in these years were solid mahogany with solid sitka spruce tops. In 1962 the adjustable bridge was introduced. In 1967 the tuner knobs were changed to metal. In 1970, the model was discontinued as a result of the acquisition of the Gibson company by Norlin, but in 1972, the Japanese-made FT-145 (Natural) and FT-145SB (Sunburst) was introduced and ended in 1980. Other models made by the Matsumoku factory included a 12-string dreadnought guitar (referred to as 'Texan-12', FT-160, FT-165, FT-365, and the FT-565).

In 2006, a Signature McCartney version of this guitar was manufactured in Bozeman, Montana in a limited edition of 250 copies. An Epiphone Elitist version, made in Japan, of 1,964 copies in honor of his original Texan which was made in 1964, were manufactured in tandem with the 250 Bozeman-built McCartney edition, minus the original signature of Sir Paul on the label. The McCartney edition is sold stringed for a left-handed player. In 2010 Epiphone released an "Inspired By" 1964 Texan. This model is still based on McCartney's original, and was manufactured in Indonesia. This model does not have the adjustable bridge, and adds a Sonic Nanoflex pickup and preamp.

== Players ==
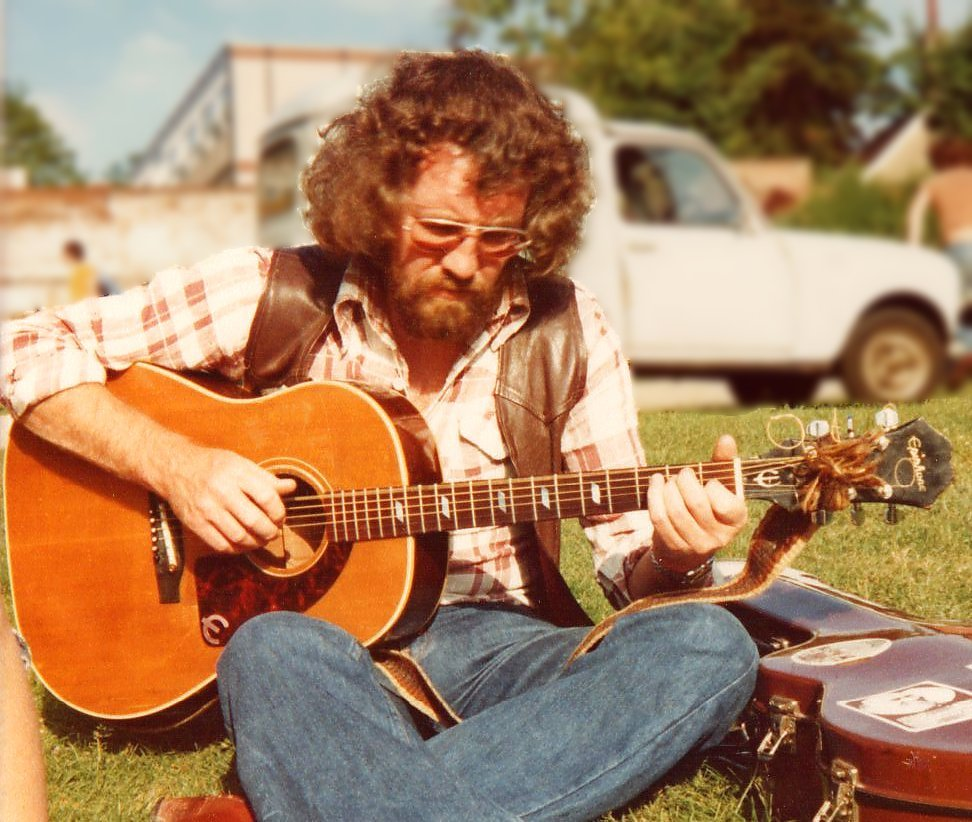
Wizz Jones playing his trademark 1963 Texan (purchased in 1967) at the 1978 Norwich Folk Festival, U.K.

The Texan was made popular by Paul McCartney for the recording and the live performances of the hit song from 1965 "Yesterday". It is also famous for being the acoustic guitar on which McCartney performed the signature "McCartney Picking" in some album pieces such as "Mother Nature's Son" (The Beatles "White Album"), "Calico Skies" (Flaming Pie), and more recently "Jenny Wren" (Chaos and Creation in the Backyard). Notably, British folk guitarist Wizz Jones has performed with a 1963 Texan (purchased in 1967) for most of his subsequent career. Bert Jansch, another prominent force in the British folk scene, played one briefly live in a 1965 concert. Also, Graham Nash used an early customized black (originally "cherryburst") Epiphone Texan while in The Hollies and during the beginnings of Crosby, Stills, Nash and Young. Other artists with which the Texan is identified are Benjamin Gibbard; Tom Rush; Al Stewart; Noel Gallagher; Jacques Dutronc; Stephen Bruton, who bequeathed his beloved first guitar to his longtime friend, T Bone Burnett; and Peter Frampton.

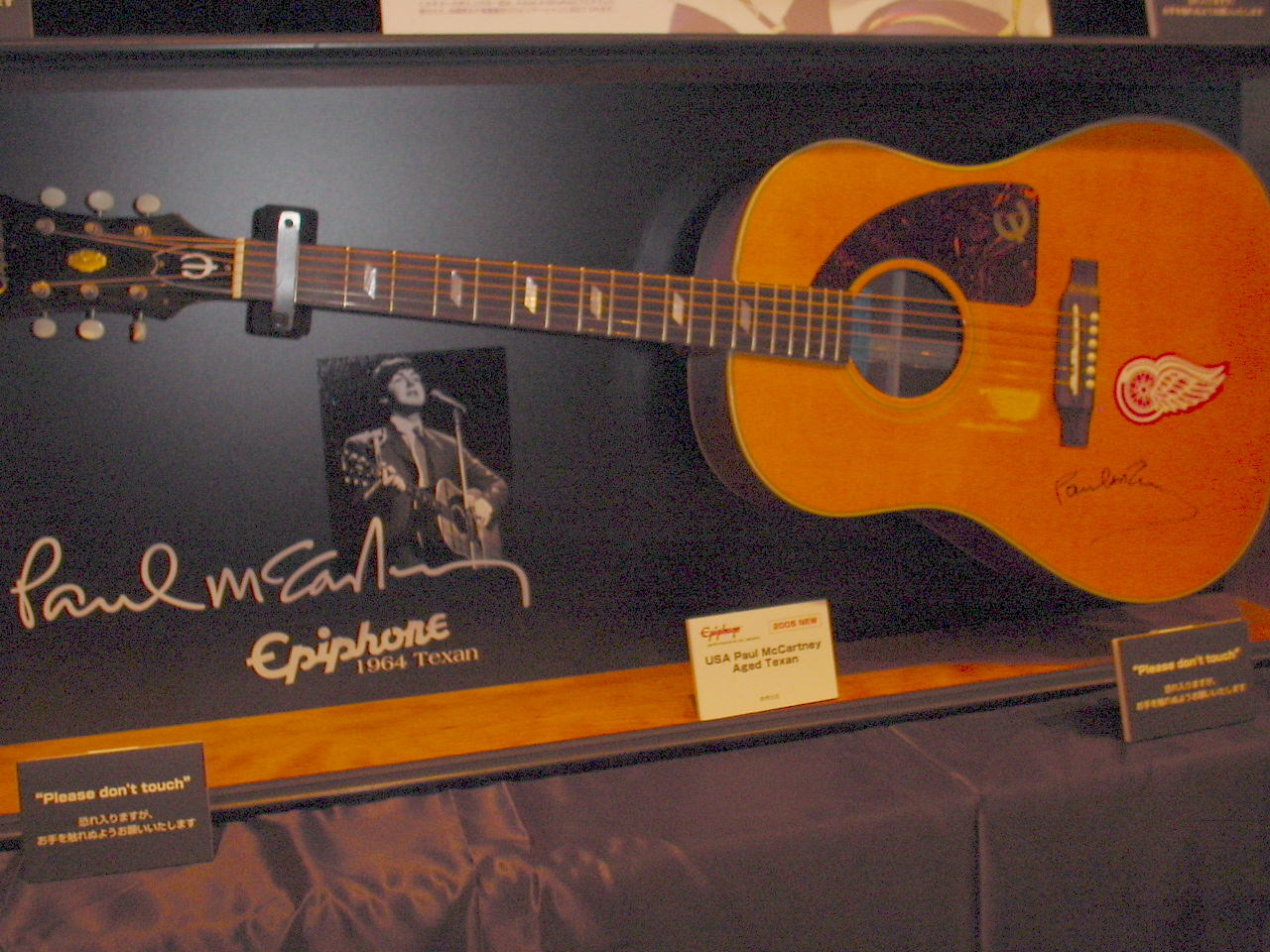
A reissue Epiphone Texan (Paul McCartney signature model)

In December 2010 a sunburst FT79 that belonged to Jimi Hendrix was auctioned at Bonhams. According to his girlfriend of the time, it was his favourite guitar. Another notable person that played this guitar was Justin Townes Earle.

In May 2013, Japanese singer-songwriter Rina Katahira also joined the family of artists, using this model.

While Kurt Cobain of Nirvana is popularly believed to have used an Epiphone Texan on the 1994 In Utero tour, he played an Epiphone FT-79 made between 1949 and 1955, before CMI/Gibson acquired the company and re-used the model number.
