= Epiphone Joe Pass Emperor II =

Korean electronic guitar model

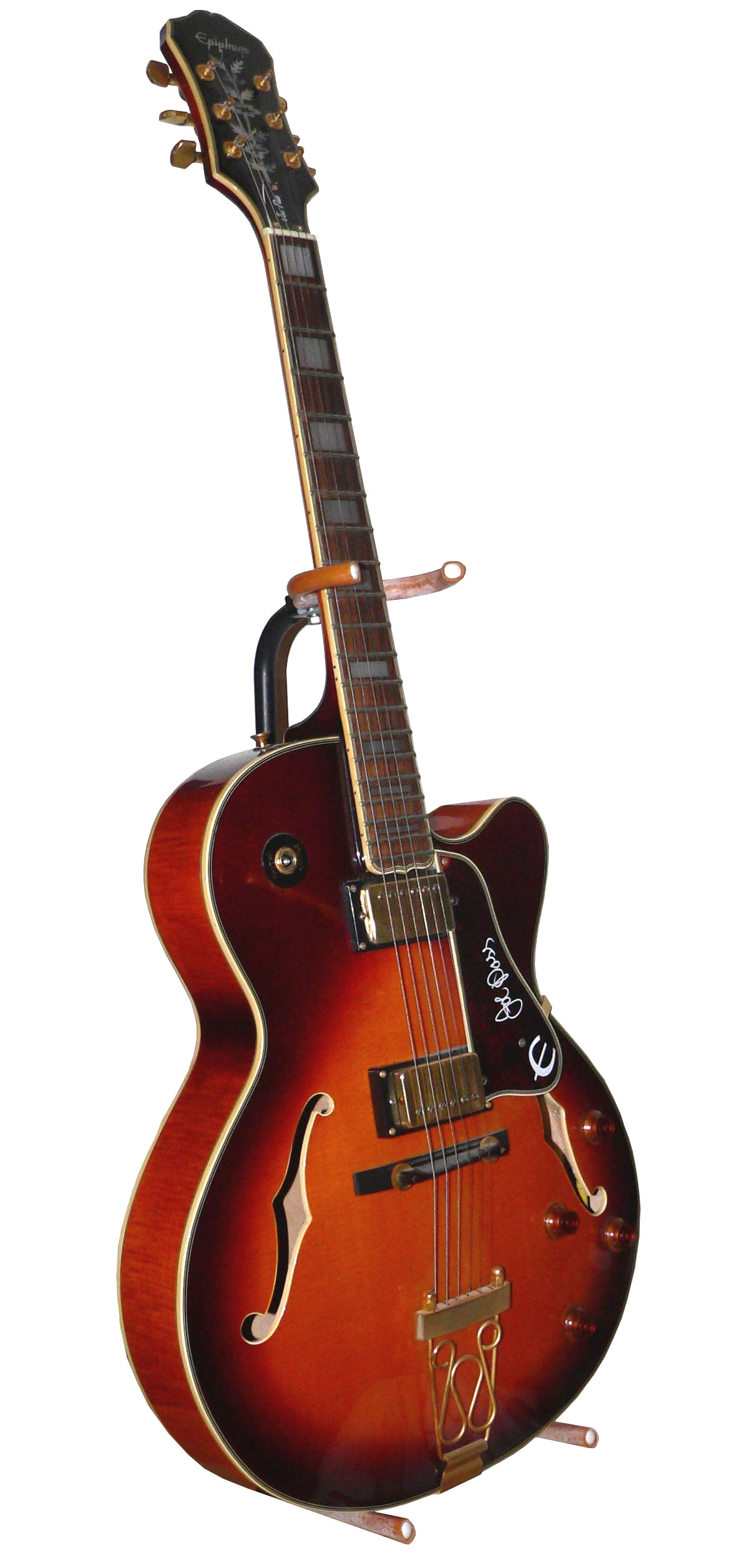
- Manufacturer: Epiphone
- Period: 1993 — present

Construction
- Body type: Archtop
- Scale: 24.75”

Woods
- Body: Maple
- Fretboard: Rosewood

Hardware
- Bridge: Rosewood
- Pickup: 2 Humbuckers

Colors available
- Polaris white, Cherry red, Various Sunbursts and custom finishes

The Epiphone Joe Pass Emperor II is an electric guitar model produced by Epiphone in Korea as Joe Pass's signature model. First released in 1994, just prior to Joe Pass's death, and was produced until 2015.

== Origins ==
Joe Pass was a Jazz guitarist becoming most well known for his solo work whilst also having recorded with a number of other artists such as Ella Fitzgerald.

Joe Pass previously had a relationship with the Ibanez guitar company, but in the late 1990s Epiphone released the Emperor II, claiming Pass had a hand in the design of the guitar. Epiphone had previously issued the guitar as just the Emperor and with Pass's endorsement some subtle changes to the guitar were made (such as moving the pickup selector switch). While Pass endorsed the Epiphone he was more commonly seen with a Gibson ES-175.

== The guitar ==
The Joe Pass Epiphone Emperor II is an archtop guitar, like a 175, but with certain unique features which included:

- Gold-plated hardware
- Multiple bound body (top and back), neck, f-holes, and peghead
- Laminated spruce top
- Maple laminate, hollow body (figured maple veneer)
- Dual humbuckers
- Raised pickguard with facsimile of Joe Pass' signature
- Gibson Byrdland style tailpiece
- Solid rosewood, floating bridge
- "Joe Pass" model name on truss rod cover
- Finishes: Natural, Vintage sunburst, Cherry sunburst (disc) Wine red (disc)
- Countries of origin: Korea (disc). Indonesia and China for the Epiphone Joe Pass Emperor II Pro
