= Epiphone Coronet =

Entry-level guitar

- Manufacturer: Epiphone
- Period: Original: 1959-1970; First reissue: 1990-99; Second reissue: 2020

Construction
- Body type: Solid body
- Neck joint: Set
- Scale: 24.25"

Woods
- Body: Mahogany
- Neck: Mahogany
- Fretboard: Rosewood

Hardware
- Pickup(s): 2 soapbar P-90s (1959-1962), 2 mini-humbuckers (1963-1970, 1982-1985, 2009-), 3 mini-humbuckers (1982-1985)

Colors available
- Polaris white, Cherry red, Various Sunbursts and custom finishes

The Epiphone Coronet is an entry-level guitar previously manufactured by Epiphone. The guitar has been manufactured a number of times since its first production on the 1950s.

== History ==
The Coronet was first manufactured by Gibson under the Epiphone brand in 1959. It was priced at approximately $120, and was seen as a reliable entry level guitar.

Originally the Coronet came with a single Epiphone New York pickup in the treble position. In 1959, Epiphone began shipping new Coronets with a P-90 pickup and began offering the Coronet with its signature cherry red finish.

Some Coronets that were manufactured in the 1960s (from 1961) were made under the Dwight brand. Dwight was a house brand used by Gibson for Sonny Shields Music in East Saint Louis (Illinois), which was owned by Charles “Dwight” Shields. The first version of these Dwight-brand Coronets featured a "D" on the pickguard and the "Dwight" logo on the headstock, the second version (introduced in 1963) of these "Dwight" Coronets had an Epiphone "batwing" headstock with "Dwight model" on the trussrod cover and no "D" on its pickguard.

In the 1970s, production of the Coronet came to a halt when Epiphone left its facilities in Kalamazoo, Michigan, to move overseas.

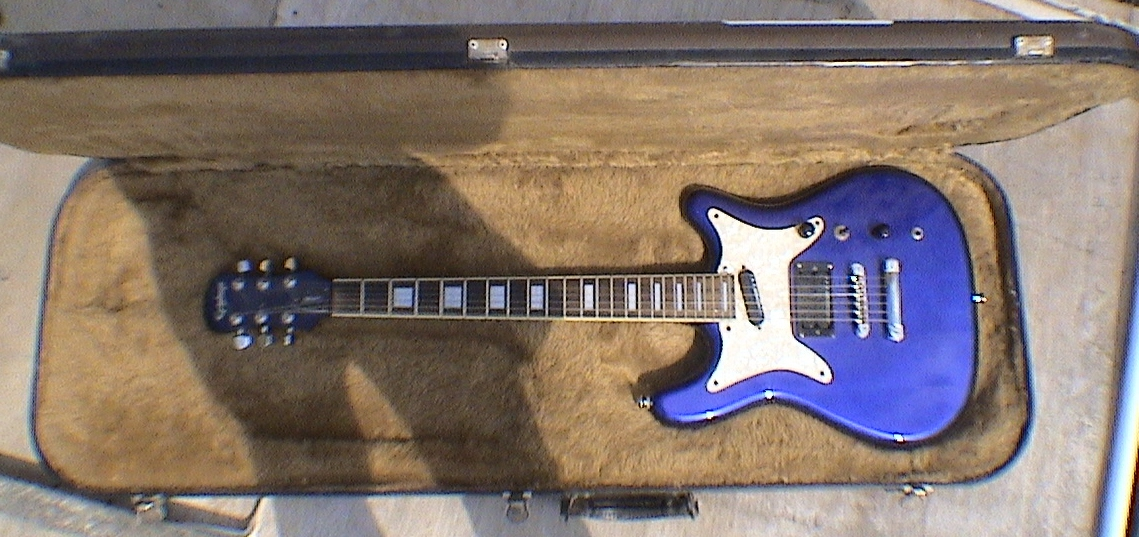
90's Epiphone Coronet with OBL pickups

There was a short run of Coronets in the late 1990s, which were made in Korea. These featured OBL model pickups, a single coil in the neck position and a humbucker in the bridge position, with a pull-out tone knob to tap the humbucker. As was the case with the original Coronet, the hardware and style of the Coronet varied through this short run. Some had six-on-a-side batwing-shaped headstocks, while others had more classic 3-on-a-side Gibson-style headstocks. The short-lived USA Coronet of 1990 had a similar pickup layout and matching electronics except for the addition of a two-octave rosewood fingerboard with rectangular block markers and a reverse droopy Explorer-style headstock. The USA Coronets came with the choice of gold hardware with stop tailpiece or black hardware with licensed Floyd Rose locking tremolo.

Epiphone reissued the Coronet again in 2020 fitted with a wrap-around bridge, a single P-90 pickup, and available in black and cherry red finishes.

Similar models

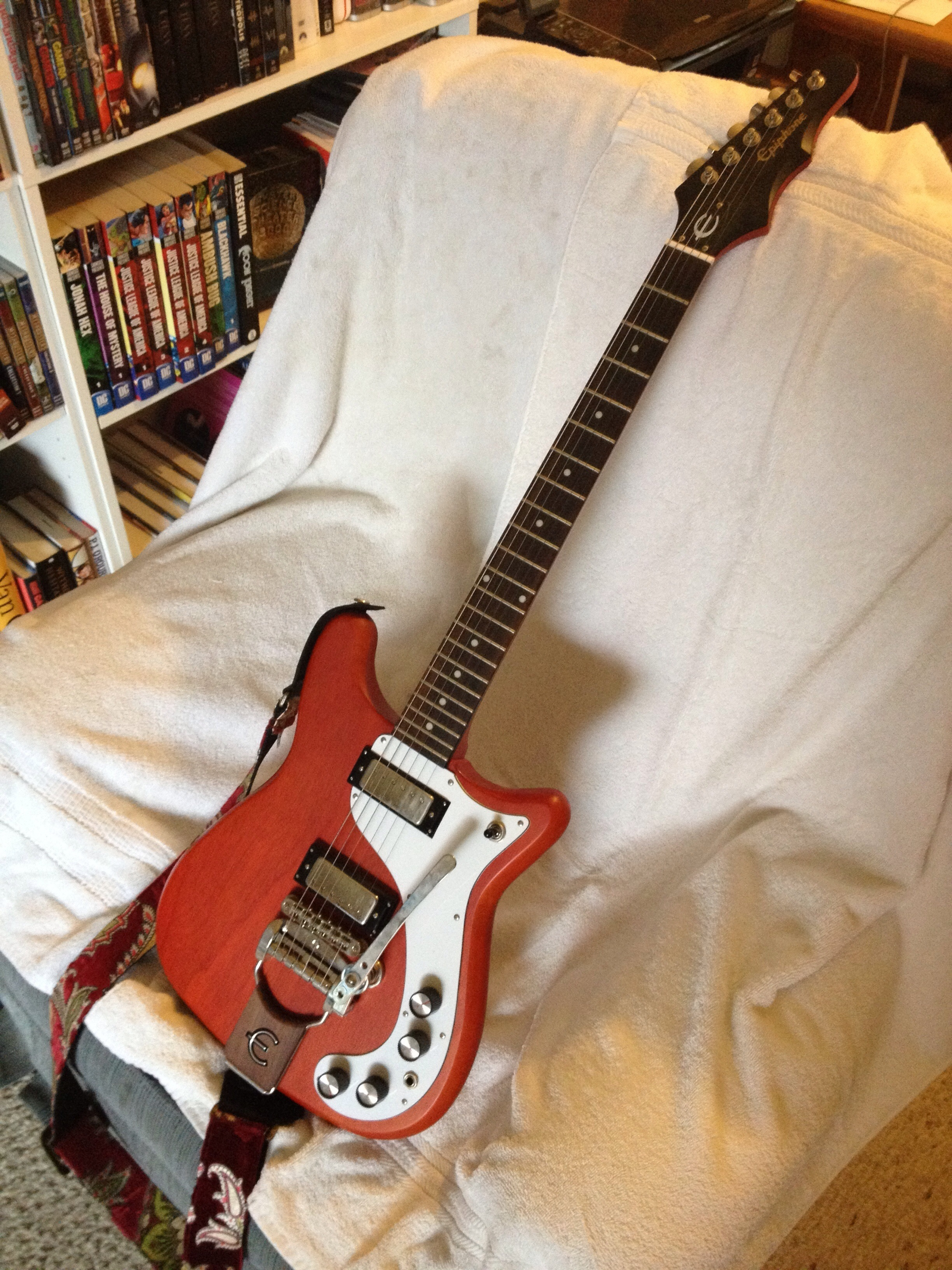
Epiphone Wilshire shares almost same body shape.

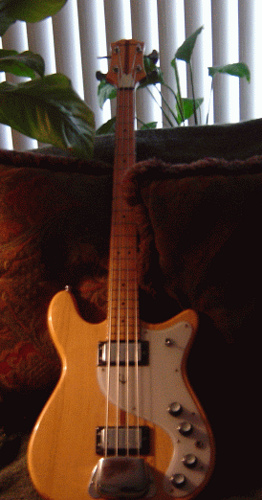
Epiphone ET-285 (ca.1974) also share similar body shape.

== Notable users ==
- Marshall Crenshaw
- Pete Doherty
- Carl Barat
- Jimi Hendrix
- Ryan Jarman
- Johnny Marr
- Ryan Ross
- Steve Marriott
- Kate Nash
- Frank Portman
- Del Shannon
- Ace Frehley
- Chris Walla
- Vigilante Carlstroem
- Grouper
- Wayne Kramer
- James McNew
- Kent Steedman
- Deniz Tek
- Pete Townshend
- Alex Turner (Arctic Monkeys)
