= Epiphone Genesis =

Genesis family of guitar models, produced by Epiphone in Taiwan

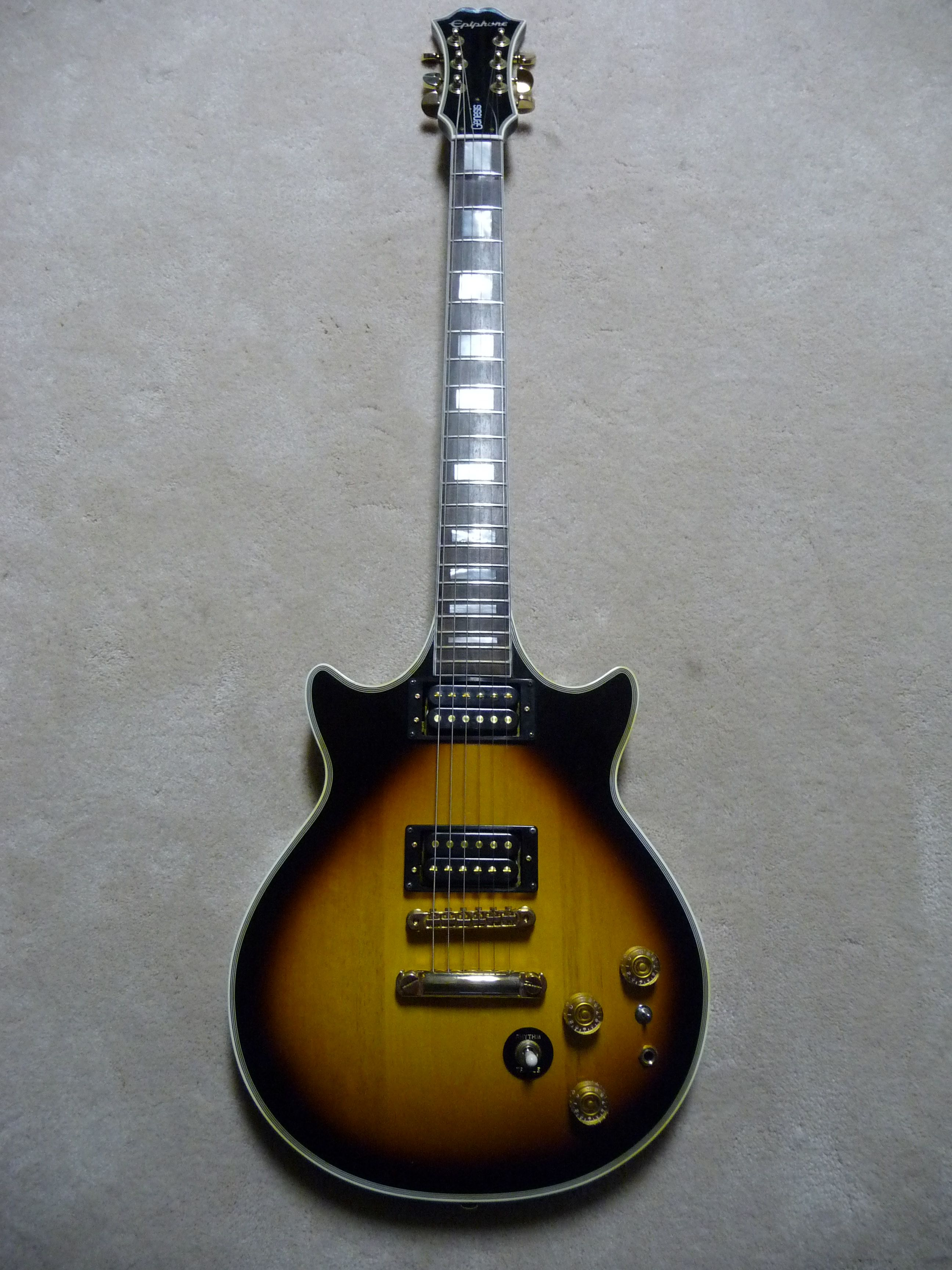
Epiphone Genesis Custom Guitar

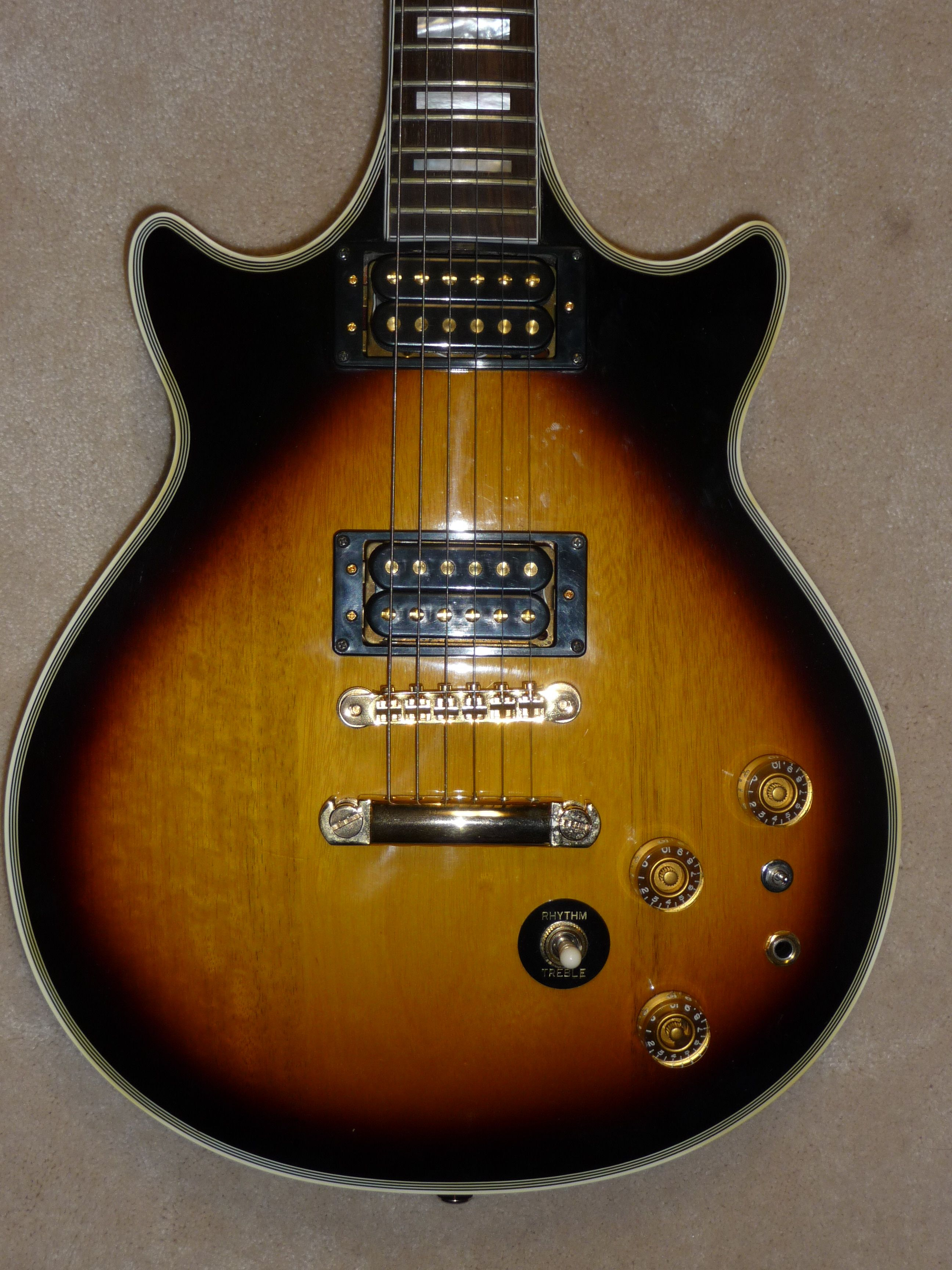
Genesis Custom Body

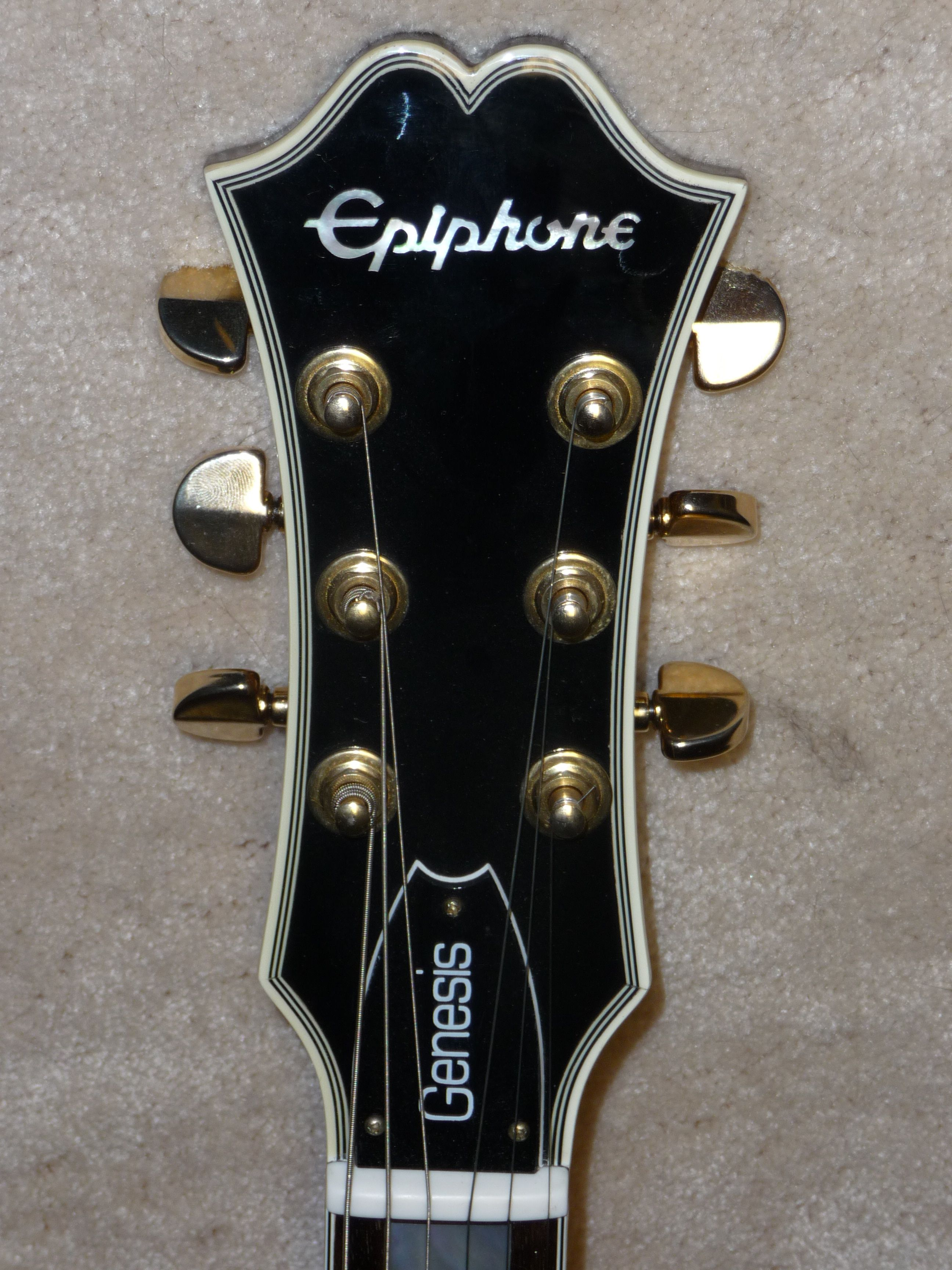
Genesis Custom Headstock

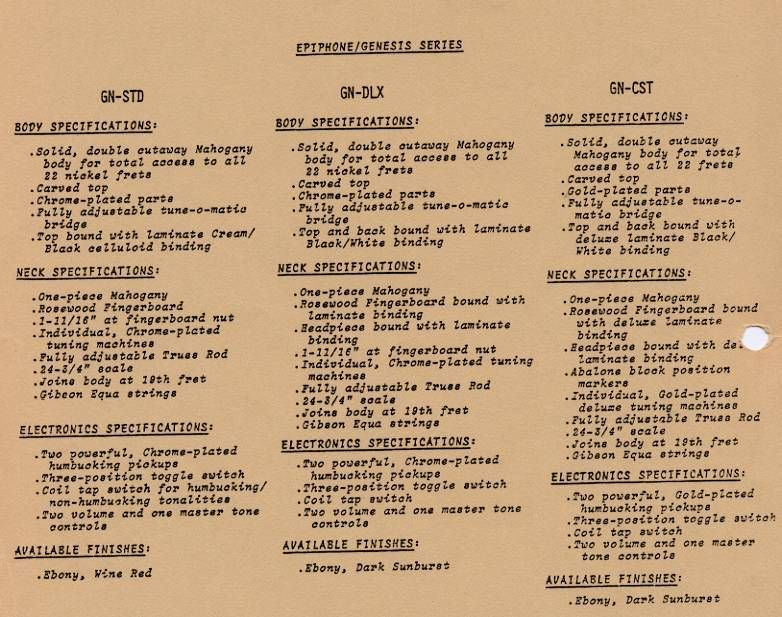
Catalog specs of Standard, Deluxe and Custom Genesis models

Epiphone Genesis refers to three Genesis Series models ever produced

== History ==
Three Genesis Series models (GN-CST, GN-DLX, GN-STD) first appeared in the 1979 Epiphone catalog and were produced in Taiwan until 1981. The 1980 price list indicates two additional Genesis Series models were offered briefly: The GN student model and the GN-BA bass. All models of the Genesis except the bass shipped with black open-coil humbucker pickups with three height-adjustment screws, rather than the plated pickup covers with two height-adjustment screws as shown in the Epiphone specification sheets. It is not known whether the student model guitar "The GN" went into production; no known examples have been identified.

The Genesis series was designed by Jim Walker, then Director of Marketing for Gibson. They were prototyped in Japan, but due to cost considerations were manufactured at a factory owned by Pearl Drums in Taichung, Taiwan.

In 2012, Epiphone reissued the model as the Limited Edition Genesis PRO.

== Construction ==
All models featured a solid mahogany body, solid mahogany set neck, rosewood fretboard, two humbucker pickups, two volume controls, one master tone control, and a DPDT switch used for coil tapping.
The Genesis also featured an elongated headstock with 3 + 3 tuners, 22 frets, a front-mounted output jack, a Tune-o-matic bridge, and stop tailpiece. The new PRO model includes two tone and two push/pull volume controls that coil split each humbucker individually. The jack has been relocated to the standard Les Paul position and the two humbucker pickups are covered on all models.

== Models ==
The Genesis was available in three models:

- The Standard had an unbound fretboard with dot inlays, single-ply binding on the body front and chrome hardware.
- The Deluxe had single-ply binding on the neck and headstock, double-ply binding on the body front and rear, chrome hardware and crown (trapezoid) inlays.
- The Custom had double-ply binding on the neck, triple-ply binding on the headstock, quadruple-ply binding on the body, rectangular block fretboard inlays and gold-plated hardware.

== Finishes ==
The Deluxe and Custom models were available in ebony (EB) and dark sunburst (DS) only.
The Standard model was available in ebony and wine red (WR).
In the July 1, 1980 catalog, the Standard model became available in dark sunburst, and an entry-level Genesis model and 4-string Genesis Bass guitar were offered.

SUGGESTED RETAIL PRICES:

January 15 and June 1, 1979
Standard: GN-STD, EB, WR $299.95
Deluxe: GN-DLX, EB, DS $349.95
Custom: GN-CST, EB, DS $399.95

January 7, 1980
Standard: GN-STD, EB, WR $329.95
Deluxe: GN-DLX, EB, DS $379.95
Custom: GN-CST, EB, DS $429.95

July 1, 1980
The Genesis: The-GN, EB, WR $279.95
Standard: GN-STD, EB, DS $329.95
Deluxe: GN-DLX, EB, DS $379.95
Custom: GN-CST, EB, DS $429.95
Bass: GN-BA, EB $349.95
