= Epiphone Crestwood =

Solid-body electric guitar

Crestwood, Crestwood Custom, Crestwood DeLuxe
- Manufacturer: Epiphone
- Period: 1958 - 1970

Construction
- Body type: Solid
- Neck joint: Set
- Scale: 24.75"

Woods
- Body: Mahogany
- Neck: Mahogany
- Fretboard: Rosewood or Ebony

Hardware
- Bridge: Tune-o-matic with Stop tailpiece optional vibrato
- Pickup(s): Two New Yorker pickups, two mini humbuckers, three minihumbuckers

Colors available
- Polaris white, Cherry red, Various Sunbursts and custom finishes

The Epiphone Crestwood was a solid-body electric guitar launched in 1958 and discontinued in 1970. After Epiphone discontinued the Crestwood, a number of re-issues and replicas has been available from different companies.

== History ==
The Crestwood was launched in 1958 by Epiphone. The guitar was a double cutaway solid-body construction in mahogany with dual New Yorker pickups, three-on-a-side headstock and a pickguard with the Epiphone logo. In late 1959 the guitar was renamed the Crestwood Custom and the body's edges were rounded off and the pickguard got a different design. In 1961 the dot markers were replaced with oval markers and the pickguard lost its Epiphone logo. By 1963 the body got a slightly longer upper horn, a six on-a-side headstock and the gold plating were replaced with nickel plating. Epiphone also launched the Crestwood DeLuxe which can easily be described as a three pickup version of the Crestwood Custom, it also featured an ebony fretboard with block inlays. The Crestwood DeLuxe was discontinued in 1969 and the Crestwood Custom the year after.

== Notable users ==
- Elliott Smith
- Vigilante Carlstroem - The Hives
- "Captain" Kirk Douglas - The Roots
- Robert Dahlqvist - The Hellacopters, Thunder Express
- Ray Hanson - Thee Hypnotics
- Wayne Kramer - MC5
- Fred "Sonic" Smith - MC5
- Deniz Tek - Radio Birdman
- Johnny Winter
- Sean Harrasser - Harvester
