= Grover Musical Products, Inc. =

- Company type: Private
- Industry: Stringed musical instrument parts
- Founded: 1952
- Headquarters: Cleveland, Ohio, United States
- Website: www.grotro.com

Grover Musical Products, Inc., is an Ohio based American company that designs, imports, and distributes stringed instrument tuners (machine heads) for guitars, bass guitars, banjos, mandolins, dulcimers, ukuleles, and other instruments. Grover also imports and distributes tuning pegs for violins and bridges for five-string and tenor banjos. The company has four divisions—former companies that they acquired: Trophy Music Co., Duplex Percussion Accessories, Grossman Music Corporation, and The Clevelander Drum Company. Grover adopted its name in 1952 when it acquired Grover Accessories Co. (formerly A. D. Grover & Son), following the death of Walter Grover.

== Acquisitions ==
- In September 1965, Grover acquired Oliver T. Knode Co. of Richmond, Indiana — manufacturer of banjo and guitar accessories.
- In December 1965, Grover acquired the Nick Lucas guitar pick line from Mills Music.

== Executives ==
Richard I. Berger (born 1952) is the president. Before becoming president, he had overseen the Trophy Grover Company and Grossman Musical Products, which in 1983, was one of the largest distributors of musical instruments in the U.S. Grossman Musical Products was founded in 1922 by his great uncle, Henry Saul Grossman (1898–1995) who, from 1953 to 1966, owned Rogers Drums. Dann William Skutt (born 1954) is the vice president.
