= Cinematix =

Studio album by Robby Krieger
- Released: October 17, 2000
- Genre: Jazz fusion
- Length: 62:01
- Label: Oglio

Robby Krieger chronology
Door Jams (1989)	Cinematix (2000)	Singularity (2010)

Professional ratings
Review scores
Source	Rating
Allmusic	3/5 stars

Cinematix is the fifth solo album by Robby Krieger, former guitarist of The Doors. The album was released in 2000.

It contains War Toad, a re-mixed, jazz-rap infused version of The Doors' Peace Frog.

== Track listing ==
1. "Snake Oil" - 4:41
2. "Idolatry" - 4:52
3. "Skip" - 4:12
4. "Missionary Jam" - 10:23
5. "Psychadelicate" - 7:56
6. "Haunted Spouse" - 3:42
7. "Red Alert" - 6:42
8. "Brandino" - 5:05
9. "Out of the Mood" - 7:57
10. "War Toad" - 6:31

== Personnel ==
- Robby Krieger - Guitar, synthesizer
- Edgar Winter, Gary Meek - Saxophone
- Arthur Barrow - Organ, bass
- Dale Alexander, T. Lavitz - Keyboards
- Kevin Brandon - Synthesizer, bass, drums
- Jeff Richman - Guitar
- Tony Newton, John Avila, Alphonso Johnson - Bass
- Bruce Gary, Richie Hayward, Johnny Hernandez, Billy Cobham - Drums
- Robbie Amar - Turntable
