= Charlie Sexton (album) =

Studio album by Charlie Sexton
- Released: 1989
- Genre: Rock
- Length: 46:47
- Label: MCA
- Producer: Bob Clearmountain, Tony Berg

Charlie Sexton chronology
Pictures for Pleasure (1985)	Charlie Sexton (1989)	Under the Wishing Tree (1995)

Professional ratings
Review scores
Source	Rating
Allmusic	4/5 stars

Charlie Sexton, released in 1989, is the second studio album released by singer and guitarist Charlie Sexton.

== Track listing ==
1. "Don't Look Back" (Charlie Sexton) – 4:42
2. "Seems So Wrong" (Arthur Barrow, Tony Berg, Charlie Sexton) – 4:30
3. "Blowing up Detroit" (John Palumbo) – 4:59
4. "I Can't Cry" (Marty Willson-Piper) – 4:28
5. "While You Sleep" (Steve Earle, Charlie Sexton) – 4:45
6. "For All We Know" (Arthur Barrow, Charlie Sexton, Danny Wilde) – 4:37
7. "Battle Hymn of the Republic" (Tony Berg, Steve Kirkorian, Charlie Sexton) – 5:05
8. "Question This" (Charlie Sexton, Scott Wilk) – 4:43
9. "Save Yourself" (Arthur Barrow, Charlie Sexton) – 4:10
10. "Cry Little Sister" (Michael Mainieri, Jr., Gerard McMann) – 4:48

== Personnel ==
- Charlie Sexton - Bass, Guitar, Piano, Keyboards, Programming, Vocals
- Arthur Barrow - Bass, Keyboards, Programming
- David Van Tieghem - Percussion

== Charts ==
Chart (1989)	Peak position
US Billboard 200	104
