= Arthur Barrow =

American musician (born 1952)

Arthur Barrow (born February 28, 1952) is a multi-instrumental musician, best known for his stint as a bass guitar player for Frank Zappa in the late 1970s and early 1980s.

== Early life ==
Barrow was born in San Antonio, Texas in 1952 and grew up in Alamo Heights. His father played piano and organ, as had his father, Arthur Barrow of Buffalo, New York, a strict piano teacher and organist. When he was 13, he washed neighborhood cars until he had saved enough money to buy his first electric guitar (an Alamo) and his first amplifier (a Kent). He learned how to play music by ear by copying surf guitar records like The Ventures, and later, Jimi Hendrix, and still later, Frank Zappa. He played in local bands through junior high and high school during the 1960s. He began to study classical organ in 1970.

While attending Alamo Heights High School, Arthur Barrow cut his musical teeth playing lead guitar in rock bands such as The Restless Ones (Jesse Childs on bass, Mike Maxwell on drums, and Jim Collins on rhythm guitar) and The Wisdom (Ian "Toby" French on vocals, Raymond Tolbert on bass, Tom Graham on keyboards, James Yeverino on drums, and Jim Collins on rhythm guitar) playing fraternity parties, high school dances, and small concerts in the San Antonio area. His fellow band members knew that Arthur was "marked for greatness" due to his outstanding talent and ability to quickly learn songs and teach them to the other band members. (source?).

He attended North Texas State University (now University of North Texas) in Denton, Texas from 1971 to 1975 where he studied composition and organ. He began teaching himself bass guitar in 1974 while at school there. He spent many hours in the electronic music labs learning about analog synthesis on the Moog modular systems there. He graduated cum laude, receiving a bachelor of music degree with a major in composition, specializing in electronic music.

== Career ==
In 1975, Barrow moved to Los Angeles to pursue a music career, with one of his main goals being to play in Frank Zappa's band. He took whatever kind of musical work he could get - night clubs, weddings, high school dances, a few sessions. He met Robby Krieger in 1976 and played synthesizer with The Doors on the album An American Prayer. He formed a jazz group with Bruce Fowler and Don Preston called Loose Connection in the latter 1970s. They made some recordings in Echo Park and performed a few times in Los Angeles. They did some recordings in Hollywood with Vinnie Colaiuta in December 1978.

In mid-1978, he passed the audition and began playing bass in Frank Zappa's band. In 1979, he also took on the duties of being the "clonemeister", or band rehearsal director. The band rehearsed for eight to ten hours a day, five days a week. He would run the rehearsals for the first half of the day, then Zappa would take over when he arrived. He did four tours with Zappa and can be heard playing bass, guitar and keyboards on about a dozen recorded albums.

In the early 1980s, he co-wrote music, recorded and toured the U.S. with Robby Krieger. They had a live band then for a short time called Red Shift that did only a few recordings and gigs in the LA area. By this time, having a 1/2" eight track tape recorder, an electric piano and some synthesizer gear, he devoted a lot of attention to writing and recording music at home.

He began working with Giorgio Moroder in the mid-1980s on albums and film sound tracks, including Scarface (1983) and Top Gun (1986). He was responsible for keyboards, programming, bass, and arranging for a wide range of artists including Joe Cocker, Diana Ross, Billy Idol, Berlin, The Motels, and others.

He opened his own Lotek recording studio in the Mar Vista district of Los Angeles in 1985. Through the latter 1980s and into the 1990s he has produced albums and composed sound tracks for films and television at his studio. He has composed and produced three solo CDs and he is currently working on a fourth CD as well as other projects, like the Strange News from Mars - feat. Tommy Mars and Jon Larsen, and The Mar Vista Philharmonic, featuring Tommy Mars, Bruce Fowler, Vinnie Colaiuta, and other Frank Zappa alumni, on the Zonic Entertainment label.

In 2010, he recorded an album with Robby Krieger called Singularity which was nominated for a Grammy. It includes performances by Vinnie Colaiuta, Bruce Fowler, Walt Fowler and Sal Marquez among others. Most of the album was co-written by Arthur Barrow and Robby Krieger and recorded at Barrow's studio.

In 2012 and again in 2015, Barrow held residencies at The University of North Texas in connection with a class on Frank Zappa which included concerts of Zappa'a music. View the 2015 concert here: He also held a Zappa residency and played a concert at The University of South Dakota in 2013.

In 2016, he published a memoir called "Of Course I Said Yes!" subtitled "The Amazing Adventures of a Life in Music." It describes his musical history from his youth up to the time of publication.

== Selected discography ==
=== Solo ===
- "In the Mood" (1985, artist, arranger, producer) - 12" dance remix of the Glenn Miller classic for MCA records.
- Music for Listening (1991)
- Eyebrow Razor (1995)
- AB3 (1999, artist, composer, arranger, producer, engineer, keyboards, bass, guitar, percussion)
- On Time (2003, artist, composer, arranger, producer, engineer, keyboards, bass, guitar, percussion)

=== Frank Zappa ===
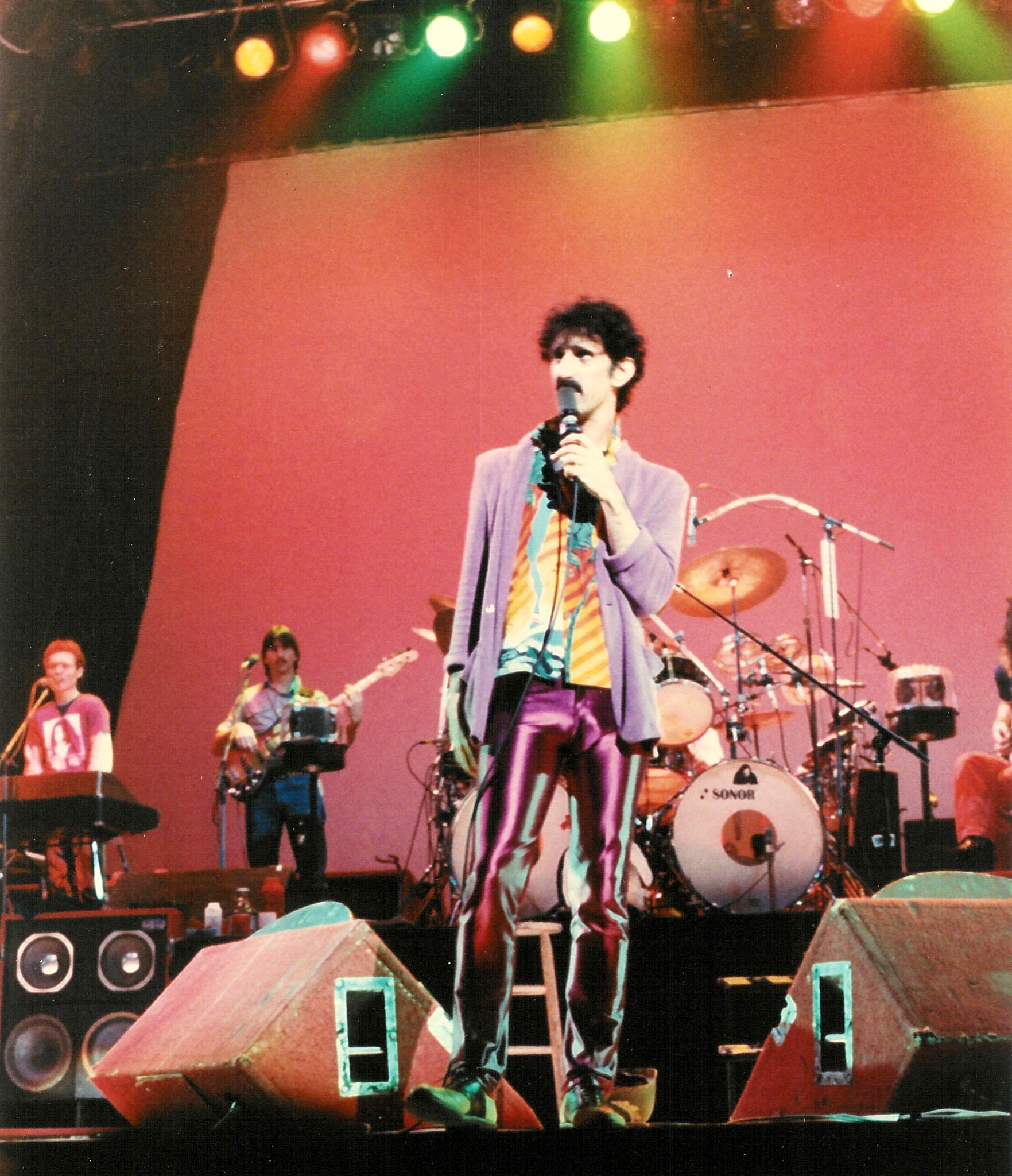
Arthur Barrow (second from left, with bass), backing Frank Zappa during a concert at the Memorial Auditorium in Buffalo, New York, October 25, 1980.

- Joe's Garage Act I (1979)
- Joe's Garage Acts II & III (1979)
- Tinsel Town Rebellion (1981)
- Shut Up 'n Play Yer Guitar / Shut Up 'n Play Yer Guitar Some More / Return of the Son of Shut Up 'n Play Yer Guitar (1981, 15 tracks recorded in 1979 and 1980)
- You Are What You Is (1981)
- Ship Arriving Too Late to Save a Drowning Witch (1982, on “No Not Now” and the first half of "I Come from Nowhere")
- The Man from Utopia (1983)
- We're Only in It for the Money (1968, overdubbed bass tracks c. 1983)
- Cruising with Ruben & the Jets (1968, overdubbed bass tracks c. 1983)
- Them or Us (1984)
- Thing-Fish (1984)
- You Can't Do That on Stage Anymore (select tracks on Vol. 1, Vol. 4 and Vol. 6)
- Guitar (1988, two tracks recorded in 1979)
- Trance-Fusion (2006, one track recorded in 1979)
- Buffalo (2007, recorded in 1980)
- One Shot Deal (2008, "Occam's Razor" 3/21/1979)
- Any Way the Wind Blows [authorized bootleg]
- Saarbrücken 1978 [authorized bootleg]
- "I Don't Want to Get Drafted" b/w "Ancient Armaments" (single)
- Chicago '78 (2016)
- Zappa '80 Mudd Club/Munich (2023)

=== The Doors ===
- An American Prayer (1978)

=== Robby Krieger ===
- Versions (1982)
- Robby Krieger (1985)
- No Habla (1989)
- Door Jams (1989)
- Singularity (2010)

=== Joe Cocker ===
- 9½ Weeks (1986, movie soundtrack) - "You Can Leave Your Hat On"
- Teachers (1984, movie soundtrack) - "Edge of a Dream"

=== Billy Idol ===
- Charmed Life (1990, keyboards, bass, arranger)

=== Diana Ross ===
- "Touch by Touch" (from the 1984 album Swept Away, co-writer, keyboards, bass, arranger)

=== Janet Jackson ===
- Dream Street (1984, co-writer of the title song)

=== Keith Emerson ===
- Musical transcription and unreleased recording. Bass

=== Jon Larsen / Tommy Mars ===
- 'Strange News from Mars' - a surrealistic concert, feat. Bruce Fowler, Jimmy Carl Black, etc.
- Willie Nickerson's Egg (2011) - a surrealistic audiobook.

=== The Motels ===
- Shock (1985, keyboards, bass)

=== Nina Hagen ===
- Fearless (1983, keyboards)

=== Berlin ===
- Love Life (1984, "No More Words" and "Dancing in Berlin")
- "Take My Breath Away" - Oscar-winning single from Top Gun soundtrack (1986). Keyboards, bass, arranger.

=== Charlie Sexton ===
- Pictures for Pleasure (1985, keyboards, bass, co-writer, arranger. 12" Remix of "Impressed")

=== Scott Merritt ===
- Violet and Black (1990, producer, arranger, bass, keyboards)

=== The Untouchables ===
- Agent Double O Soul (1988, producer, arranger, co-writer)

=== Oingo Boingo ===
- 12" Remix of "Stay" (1986)

=== Mona Lisa Overdrive ===
- Mona Lisa Overdrive (1993, artist, co-writer, arranger, producer, engineer, keyboards, bass)

=== Silent film music ===
- Torrent (1926, starring Greta Garbo)
- The Boob (1926, starring Joan Crawford)
- The Cameraman (1928, starring Buster Keaton)
- The Last Warning (1928, starring Laura La Plante)

=== Films (keyboards, bass, arranger in varying degrees) ===
- Scarface (1983)
- D.C. Cab (1983)
- Twilight Zone: The Movie (1983)
- Heavenly Bodies (1984)
- The NeverEnding Story (1984)
- Electric Dreams (1984)
- The Breakfast Club (1985)
- Top Gun (1986)
- Iron Eagle (1986)
- Quicksilver (1986)
- Project A-ko (1986)
- Beverly Hills Bodysnatchers (1989)
- The Doors (1991)
- Waxwork II: Lost in Time (1992)
- Saviors of the Forest (1993, documentary)

=== TV shows (music/lyrics) ===
- Misfits of Science (1985-1986, an American superhero fantasy television series that aired on NBC from October 1985 to February 1986)
- Fast Times (1986, television mini-series)
- The Great Eclipse (1992, TV movie)
- The Florida Panther
