= Robby Krieger =

American guitarist (born 1946)

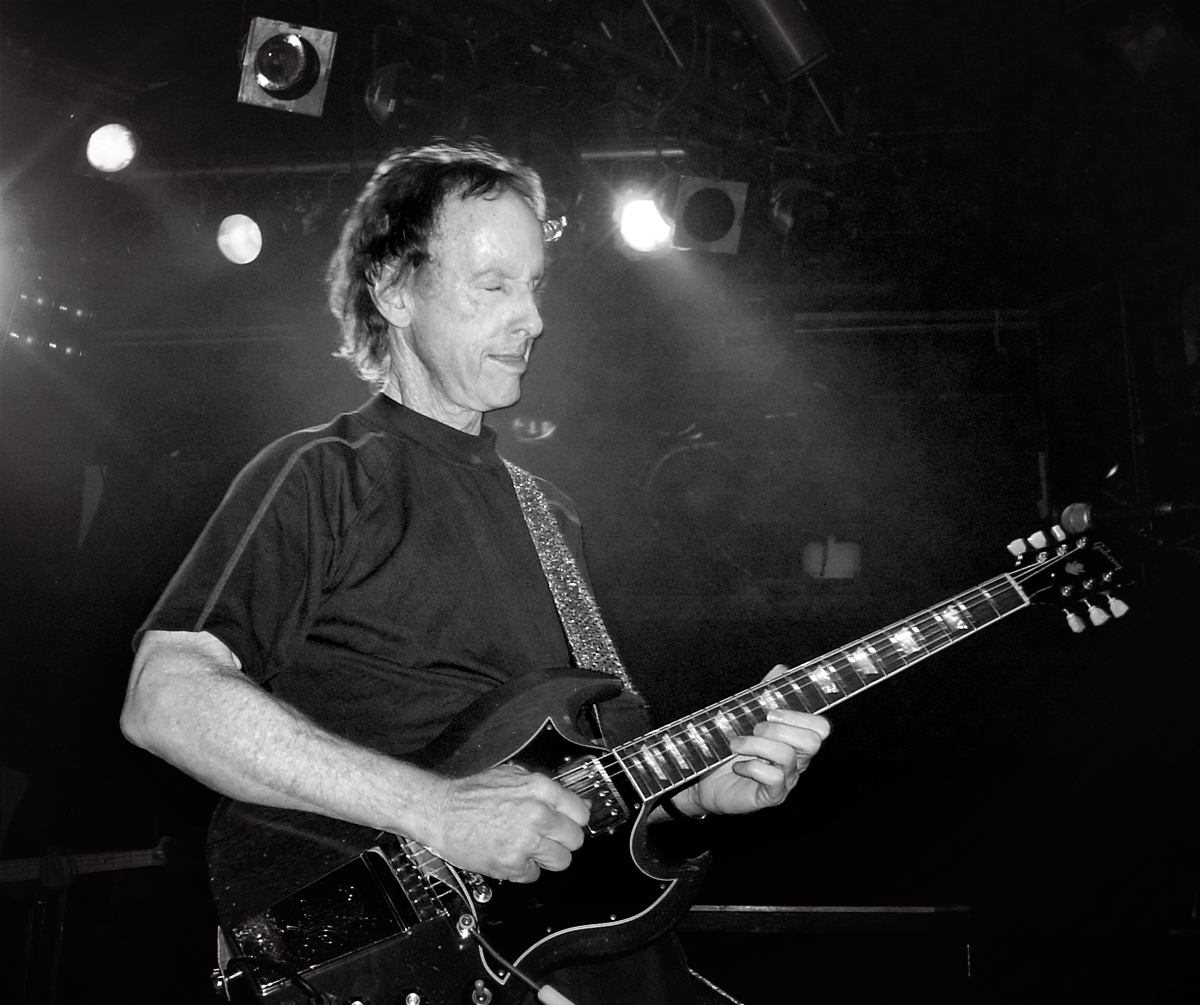
- Krieger in 2007

Background information
- Born: Robert Alan Krieger; January 8, 1946 (age 80); Los Angeles, California, U.S.
- Genres: Psychedelic rock; flamenco; blues rock; art rock; jazz fusion; acid jazz; proto-prog
- Occupations: Musician; songwriter
- Instruments: Guitar; vocals
- Years active: 1964–present
- Label: Elektra
- Member of: Krieger & The Soul Savages; Robby Krieger Band
- Formerly of: Rick & the Ravens; The Doors; Butts Band; Red Shift; Manzarek–Krieger; Doors with poet Michael C. Ford
- Website: robbykrieger.com

Robert Alan Krieger (born January 8, 1946) is an American guitarist and founding member of the rock band the Doors. Krieger wrote or co-wrote many of the Doors' songs, including the hits "Light My Fire", "Love Me Two Times", "Touch Me", and "Love Her Madly". When the Doors disbanded shortly after the death of lead singer Jim Morrison, Krieger continued to perform and record with other musicians including former Doors bandmates John Densmore and Ray Manzarek. In the 2023 edition of Rolling Stone's 250 greatest guitarists of all time, he was positioned at number 248.

== Early life and education ==
Robby Krieger was born on January 8, 1946 in Los Angeles, California to a Jewish family. His father, Stuart "Stu" Krieger, was an engineer and a fan of classical music, while his mother, Marilyn Ann (née Shapiro), enjoyed "Frank Sinatra and stuff like that".

Krieger attended a Hebrew school with his twin brother Ronny. While Krieger was a boarding student at a private school called Menlo School in Atherton, California, there was study time at night that allowed him to teach himself to play the guitar. He began by first de-tuning a ukulele to the bottom four strings of a guitar and mimicking a record he had. Later, in the mid-1960s, scholar Frank Chin taught Krieger how to play the flamenco guitar.

After graduating high school, Krieger attended the University of California, Santa Barbara. His musical development included listening to guitarists Wes Montgomery, Albert King and Larry Carlton who influenced his style. Krieger's flamenco guitar playing can be heard in the song "Spanish Caravan".

== The Doors ==
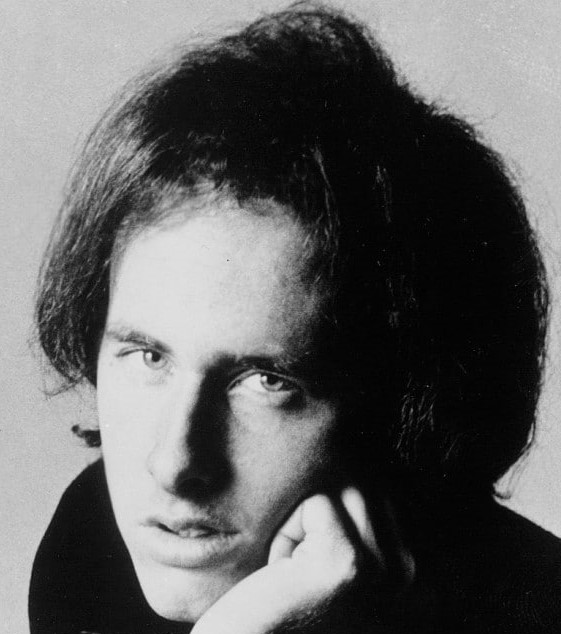
Robby Krieger in 1968

Krieger became a member of the Doors in 1965, joining keyboard player Ray Manzarek, drummer John Densmore, and vocalist Jim Morrison, after Manzarek's brothers left the group. At an early Doors rehearsal, Morrison heard Krieger playing bottleneck guitar and initially wanted the technique featured on every song on the first album. Krieger's fingerstyle approach to the electric guitar, broad musical tastes, and songwriting helped establish the Doors as a successful rock band in the 1960s. Together with Densmore, he studied under Indian sitarist Ravi Shankar at the Kinnara School of Music in Los Angeles.

Krieger occasionally sang lead vocals with the Doors. He can be heard on the song "Runnin' Blue". He also sang on the last two Doors albums, recorded after Morrison's death, Other Voices and Full Circle.

After Morrison's death in 1971, Krieger, Manzarek, and Densmore carried on as a trio. They released two more albums as the Doors before disbanding in 1973, though they did reconvene a few years later to create music for poetry that Morrison had recorded shortly before his death, released as the 1978 album An American Prayer.

== Later career ==
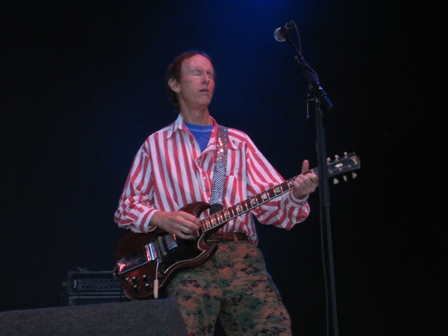
Krieger performing in 2006

After the Doors disbanded in 1973, Krieger formed the Butts Band with Densmore. He recorded as a jazz-fusion guitarist, making a handful of albums in the 1970s and 1980s, including Versions (1982), Robby Krieger (1985), and No Habla (1989). His first solo release was Robbie Krieger & Friends in 1977.

In 1982, Krieger appeared on four tracks of the album Panic Station by the Los Angeles group The Acid Casualties ("Shadow Street," "Solid Sound," "Armies of the Sun," and "She's a Lost Soul").

In 1991, Krieger formed a new band known as the Robby Krieger Band, which featured his son Waylon Krieger (guitar), Berry Oakley Jr. (bass, backing vocals), Dale Alexander (keyboards), and Ray Mehlbaum (drums). In 2000, Krieger released Cinematix, an entirely instrumental fusion album, with guest appearances from Billy Cobham and Edgar Winter.

Krieger and Manzarek reformed as the "Doors of the 21st Century" in 2002 with vocalist Ian Astbury of the Cult. (Astbury had also performed a solo cover of "Touch Me" and a cover of "Wild Child" with the Cult on the tribute album Stoned Immaculate: The Music of The Doors).

Krieger played guitar on a few tracks by Blue Öyster Cult. In June 2008, ZYX Studio released his concert with Eric Burdon, called Live at the Ventura Beach California. They also played "Back Door Man" and "Roadhouse Blues".

In May 2012, Krieger toured with the Roadhouse Rebels, a trio side-project consisting of founding members Particle's (and Rich Robinson's keyboardist) Steve Molitz (Hammond organ, keyboards) and Oingo Boingo/Mutaytor's John Avila (bass), only this time with two additional musicians, Rich Robinson (guitar/vocals) and his drummer Joe Magistro. The shows' setlists featured a range of material, including Doors standards, classic soul and rock 'n' roll covers from the '60s and '70s, and material from Robinson's new Through a Crooked Sun album. The group performed on May 25, 2012, in Los Angeles, on May 26, 2012, at the Bella Fiore Music Festival at Harmony Park Music Garden in Clarks Grove, Minnesota, and on May 27, 2012, at the Oriental Theater in Denver.

On October 31, 2013, Krieger played alongside Southern rock band Gov't Mule at the Beacon Theatre in New York City. In July 2017, Krieger tossed out the first pitch at a Dodgers game in Los Angeles.

On August 29, 2018, Krieger joined Alice in Chains onstage at the Hollywood Palladium in Los Angeles to close out their sold-out concert with a performance of their hit song "Rooster". On August 14, 2020, Krieger released his solo album, The Ritual Begins At Sundown. On September 10, 2020, Krieger was announced as a headliner featuring Maki Mae in the Asian Hall of Fame Induction Ceremony.

In 2020, Krieger began uploading guitar tutorials for various Doors songs to the band's official YouTube channel.

On October 12, 2021, Krieger released a memoir Set the Night on Fire: Living, Dying, and Playing Guitar With the Doors, co-written with author and musician Jeff Penalty Alulis.

== Personal life ==
Krieger was married to Lynn Krieger and has one child. Krieger announced on social media that his wife passed away on October 29, 2026.

== Guitars used ==
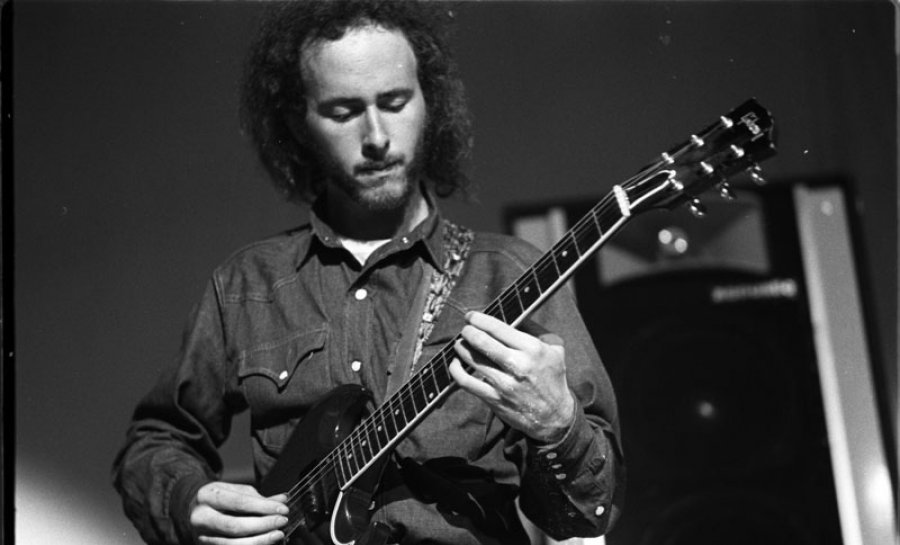
Krieger performing live at Roundhouse in London September 1968. Krieger used various guitar models, most notably Gibson SG models.

Krieger used a variety of electric guitar models during his time with the Doors, most notably the following ones:

- 1964 Gibson SG Special
- 1958 National 'Town & Country' (Model 1104)
- 1967 Gibson SG Special
- 1968 Gibson SG Standard
- 1954 Gibson Les Paul Custom ('Black Beauty')
- Black Gibson SG Standard

== Discography ==
=== with The Doors ===
- The Doors (1967)
- Strange Days (1967)
- Waiting for the Sun (1968)
- The Soft Parade (1969)
- Morrison Hotel (1970)
- L.A. Woman (1971); last album to feature singer Jim Morrison before his death
- Other Voices (1971)
- Full Circle (1972)
- An American Prayer (1978)

=== with Butts Band ===
- Butts Band (1974)
- Hear and Now (1975)

=== with Red Shift ===
- Red Shift (album) (1979)
- Shifting On Strong (album) (1980)

=== Solo ===
- Robbie Krieger & Friends (1977)
- Versions (1982)
- Robby Krieger (1985)
- No Habla (1989)
- Door Jams (1989)
- Cinematix (2000)
- Singularity (2010)
- The Ritual Begins at Sundown (2020)
- Robby Krieger & The Soul Savages (2024)

=== with poet Michael C. Ford ===
- Look Each Other in the Ears. Hen House Studio Album includes the Doors—Robby Krieger, John Densmore, and Ray Manzarek. 2014

=== Guest appearances ===
- "Puppet Strings" on Puppet Strings, by Fuel (2014)
- "Five to One/Break On Through (To The Other Side) and "One/Jump into the Fire" on Hollywood Vampires by Hollywood Vampires (2015)
- "ZUN – Burial Sunrise" (2016, Small Stone Records) Electric Sitar on 'Nothing Farther'
- "Forest Full of Trees" and "Stagger Lee" on Rock 'N' Roll Animals (2016) and "Big Brown Dog" w/ Brant Bjork on Bunny Rumble (2018) by Bunny Racket
- "All the Time in the World" on Alphabetland (2020) and "Strange Life" on Xtras (2021), Alphabetland outtakes), by X
- "Black Mamba" on The Revenge of Alice Cooper by Alice Cooper (2025)

== In fiction ==
- For Director Oliver Stone's movie The Doors (1991), Krieger had a small cameo as a backstage patron at the London Fog, while his younger self was portrayed by Frank Whaley.

== See also ==
- Outline of the Doors
