= Door Jams =

Compilation album by Robby Krieger
- Released: 1989
- Recorded: 1977–1989
- Genre: Rock

Robby Krieger chronology
No Habla (1989)	Door Jams (1989)	Cinematix (2000)

Door Jams is a 14-track compilation album from Robby Krieger, former guitarist for The Doors, released September 22, 1989 on I.R.S.Records.

The album contains tracks from each of Krieger's first three solo LPs.

== Track listing ==
1. "Gavin Leggit" (from Versions, 1982)
2. "East End, West End" (from Versions, 1982)
3. "Her Majesty" (from Versions, 1982)
4. "Reach Out, I'll Be There" (from Versions, 1982)
5. "I'm Gonna Tell On You" (from Versions, 1982)
6. "Spare Changes" (from Robbie Krieger & Friends, 1977)
7. "Big Oak Basin" (from Robbie Krieger & Friends, 1977)
8. "Reggae Funk" (from Robby Krieger, 1985)
9. "Crystal Ship" (from Versions, 1982)
10. "Underwater Fall" (from Versions, 1982)
11. "Bass Line Street" (from Robby Krieger, 1985)
12. "Bag Lady" (from Robby Krieger, 1985)
13. "Low Bottomy" (from Robbie Krieger & Friends, 1977)
14. "The Ally" (from Robbie Krieger & Friends, 1977)
