= Gibson SG Special =

Electric guitar

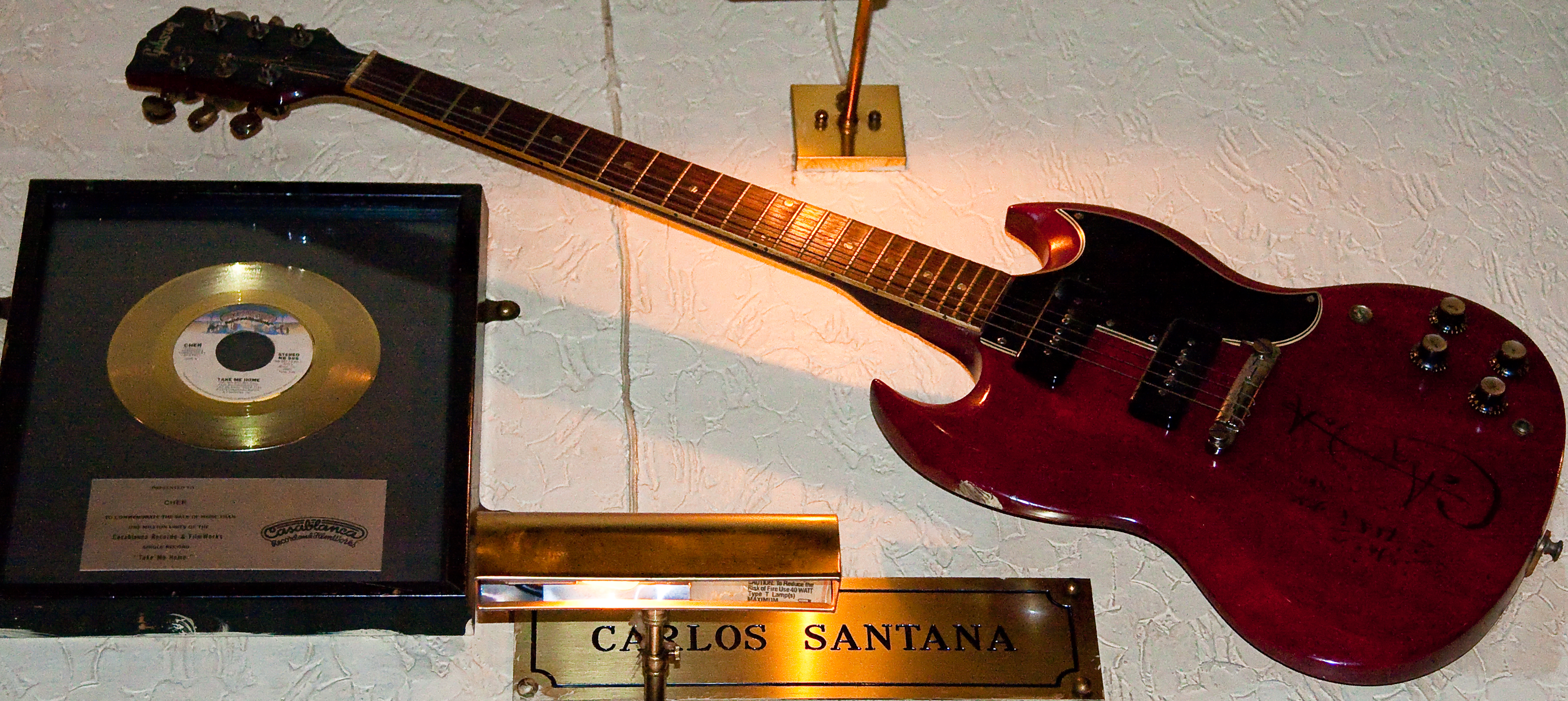
- Manufacturer: Gibson
- Period: 1961–present

Construction
- Body type: Solid
- Neck joint: Set
- Scale: 24.75"

Woods
- Body: Mahogany
- Neck: Mahogany, Maple
- Fretboard: 22 or 24 fret - Ebony, Rosewood, or Baked Maple

Hardware
- Bridge: Fixed
- Pickup(s): Original/Classic: P-90; Humbucker model: 490T (bridge) / 490R (neck)

Colors available
- Current Range: Butterscotch, Heritage Cherry, Desert Burst, Ebony, Fireburst, Walnut

The Gibson SG Special is an electric guitar made by Gibson that has been manufactured since 1961.

== Origins ==
The SG Special was between the Junior and Standard model and was introduced concurrent with the Junior. It featured two P-90 pickups with either a stoptail bridge or an optional Vibrola. On this mid-level SG model, Gibson kept the neck binding but used dot inlays in place of the trapezoid position markers of the standard model and did not use the crown inlay on the headstock. With various minor changes (bridge and tailpiece replacing the stoptail in 1972, mini humbucker pickups between 1972 and 1976 and full sized open-coil humbuckers thereafter) the model has remained in continuous production.

The influence of the P90-equipped SGs of the late 1960s and later reissues (such as the more recent SG classic—a modern reissue of the late 1960s SG Special) have spanned the rock genre and have notably been played by the likes of Pete Townshend (The Who: late-1960s SG Specials), Tony Iommi (Black Sabbath: Red 1964 SG Special modified by John Birch), Allison Robertson (The Donna's – Gold Medal: SG Classic with rare walnut finish), Davey Lane (The Pictures, You Am I: SG Classic finished in cherry), Billy Lunn (The Subways: SG Special finished in black) and Carlos Santana (Santana: SG Special finished in dark cherry)

== Recent models ==
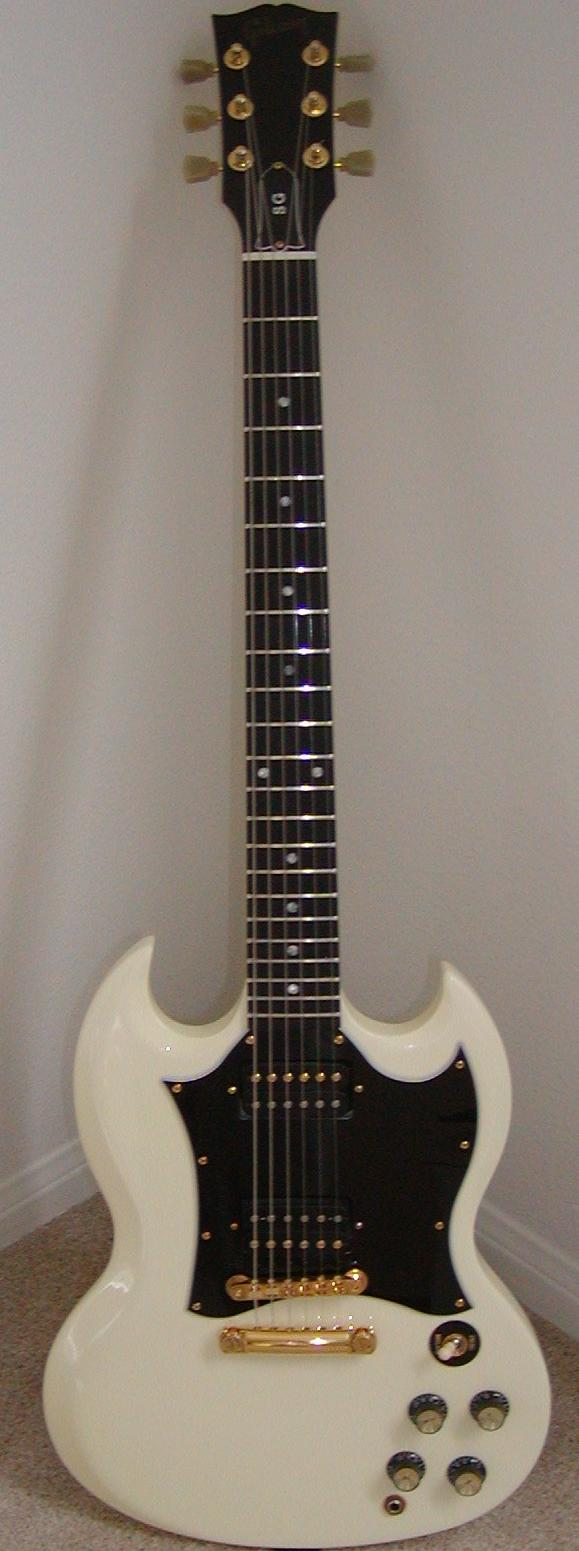

Recent models of the Gibson SG Special represent a cheaper model in their product line-up. Typically, it does not include the stylized neck binding of other models, or mother-of-pearl, trapezoid fret inlays. The wraparound stoptail bridge has been replaced with Gibson's standard Tune-O-Matic arrangement on the Classic and Special reissues, while the reissue of the Junior retains the original one-piece bridge. Most SG Specials (like their Standard counterpart) have a volume and tone knob for each pickup and a 3-way selector switch. From 1983 to 1988, a simpler three-knob model was produced. Gibson has reduced cost further with the faded series, which has a rougher and less finished stained body. As of 2014 Gibson has changed the neck wood from mahogany to maple, as well as completely done away with the pickguard, to further reduce cost. The example pictured on the right is not one of the cheaper models but in 1998 and 1999 the SG Special Limited Edition which was a higher-end version with all gold hardware and ebony fingerboard; at the time it retailed at $1,500 to $2,200.

Gibson's subsidiary Epiphone have their own version of the SG Special. It has a mahogany body, maple neck and rosewood fretboard. It has dot fretboard inlays with one volume and tone control knob each with the tone knob having the Epiphone killpot killswitch which momentarily mutes the volume output.

== See also ==
- Gibson SG
  - Gibson SG Junior
  - Gibson SG Custom
- Gibson Les Paul Special – in late 1959, its doublecut model was renamed to "SG Special", due to discontinuation of Les Paul affiliation.
