= Gibson SG =

Solid body electric guitar model

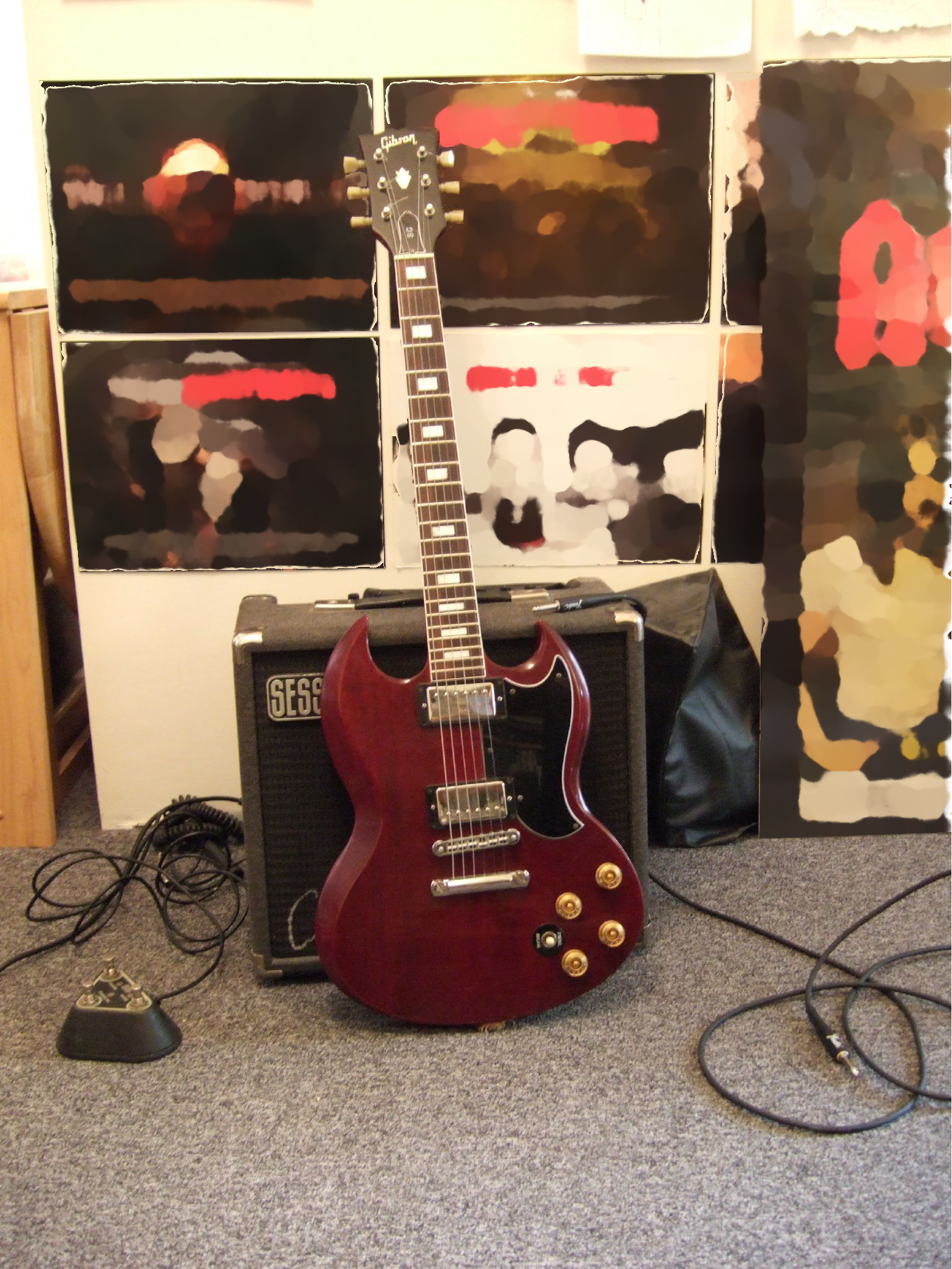
- 1984 Gibson SG Standard
- Manufacturer: Gibson
- Period: 1961–present

Construction
- Body type: Solid
- Neck joint: Set-in, bolt-on for some entry level models
- Scale: 24.75"

Woods
- Body: Mahogany (some models feature maple tops), birch laminate, maple
- Neck: Mahogany, Birch Laminate, Maple
- Fretboard: Rosewood, ebony, maple, richlite

Hardware
- Bridge: Hardtail (Tune-O-Matic), Gibson wraparound bridge/tailpiece (SG Junior and SG Special), Schaller "harmonica" bridge (used on SG Standards and SG Customs from the early 1970s to the end of the 1970s).
- Pickup(s): 1, 2 (SG Standard) or 3 (SG Custom) Humbuckers; 1 (SG Junior), 2 (SG Special) or 3 (Gary Clark Jr. model) P-90s; certain entry-level versions have smaller single coil pickups.

Colors available
- Heritage Cherry, Natural, Walnut, Mahogany, Classic White, Ebony and various specialty colors and bursts.

The Gibson SG, also known as Gibson Solid Guitar, is a solid-body electric guitar model introduced by Gibson in 1961, following on from the 1952 Gibson Les Paul. It remains in production in multiple variations of the initial design. SG stands for "solid guitar".

== Origins ==
The SG design was given a double cutaway body that is thinner and more contoured than the Les Paul. Not only did this make the upper frets more accessible, it was further eased by moving the neck joint outwards by three frets. The simpler body construction significantly reduced production costs, and the SG, with its slender neck profile and small heel where it joined the body, was advertised as having the "fastest neck in the world".

Although the new guitar was popular, Les Paul strongly disliked it. Problems with the strength of the body and neck made Paul dissatisfied with the new instrument. At the same time, Paul was going through a public divorce from wife and vocalist partner Mary Ford, and his popularity was dwindling as music tastes had changed in the early 1960s. Paul asked lifelong friend and former President of Gibson Ted McCarty to withhold his $1 royalty per guitar, and Gibson mutually agreed to end the contract. Gibson also honored Les Paul's request to remove his name from the guitar.

In the early-to-mid 1960s Gibson's parent corporation, Chicago Musical Instruments, revived the Kalamazoo brand name for a short time. Later models of the KG-1 and KG-2 featured a body style similar to the Gibson SG, effectively creating a budget-line model until the brand was dropped in the late 1960s. Since the 1980s, Gibson has made lower-cost, internationally sourced versions of the SG under their subsidiary Epiphone.

== Design ==
The SG generally has a solid mahogany body, with a black pickguard. The 24.75-inch (629 mm) scale mahogany neck joins the body at the 19th or 22nd fret. Early models had a smaller neck joint with a longer tenon. This neck design provided access above the 16th fret. Epiphone-made bolt-on neck models still use a 16th fret neck joint. (Note: Although 22nd fret joint is seen on early models (1961–1966) and current models (since 1986), historically 17th, 18th, and 19th fret joint models were manufactured from 1967 to 1985.) The SG's set neck is shallower than the Les Paul's. The SG features the traditional Gibson combination of two or three P-90 single-coil or humbucker pickups and a Tune-o-matic bridge assembly, wraparound bridge, or vibrato tailpiece, depending on the model.

The SG Standard features pearloid trapezoid fretboard inlays, as well as fretboard binding and inlaid pearl "Gibson" logo and crown; the mid-level SG Special features pearloid dot inlays and an inlaid pearl "Gibson" logo, without a crown. The Standard has a volume and a tone control for each individual pickup, and a three-way switch that allows the player to select either the bridge pickup, the neck pickup, or both together. The SG does not include switching to coil split the humbuckers in stock form.

Some models use body woods other than mahogany; examples include the swamp ash SG Special, the SG Zoot Suit, made using multiple birch wood laminate, and the SG Voodoo, the 2009 Raw Power, and some walnut bodied 1970s models. High-end models, including the Diablo, occasionally sport decorative maple caps, carved tops, and gold hardware.

== Models and variations ==
early models

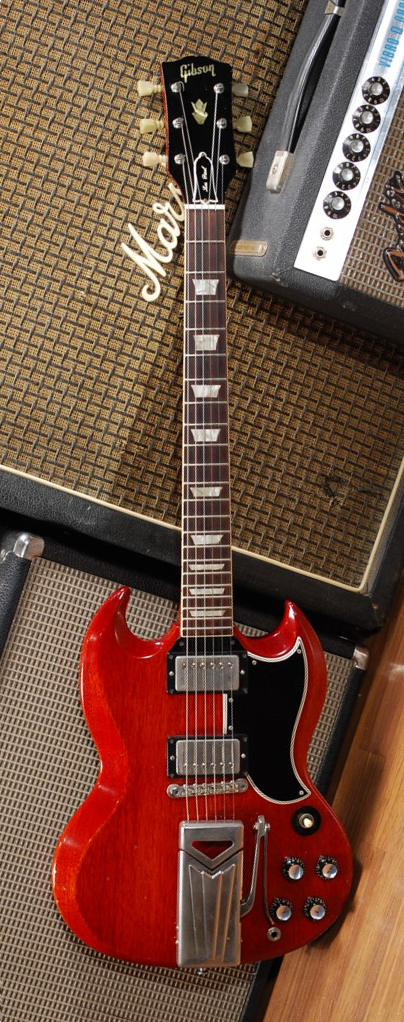
SG Standard (Les Paul)

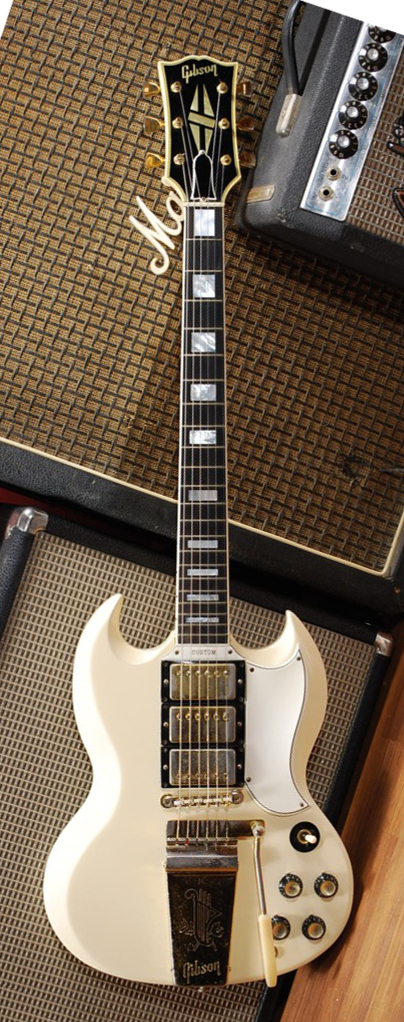
SG Custom

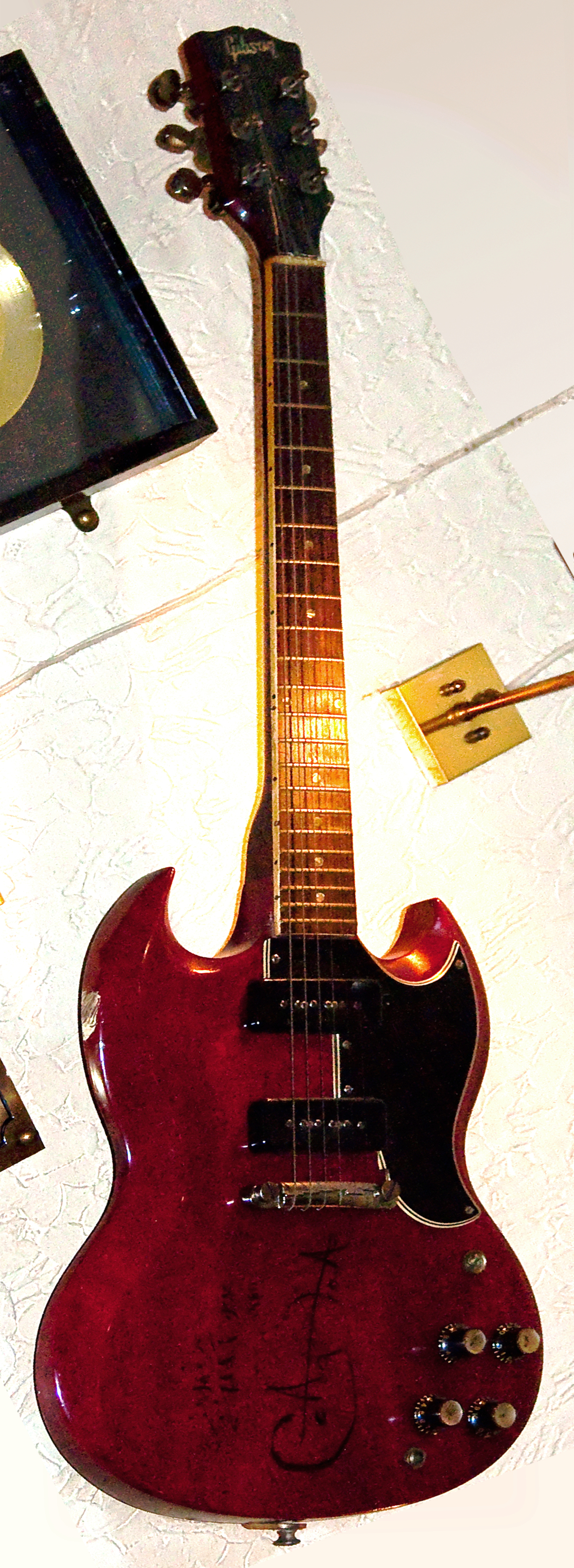
SG Special

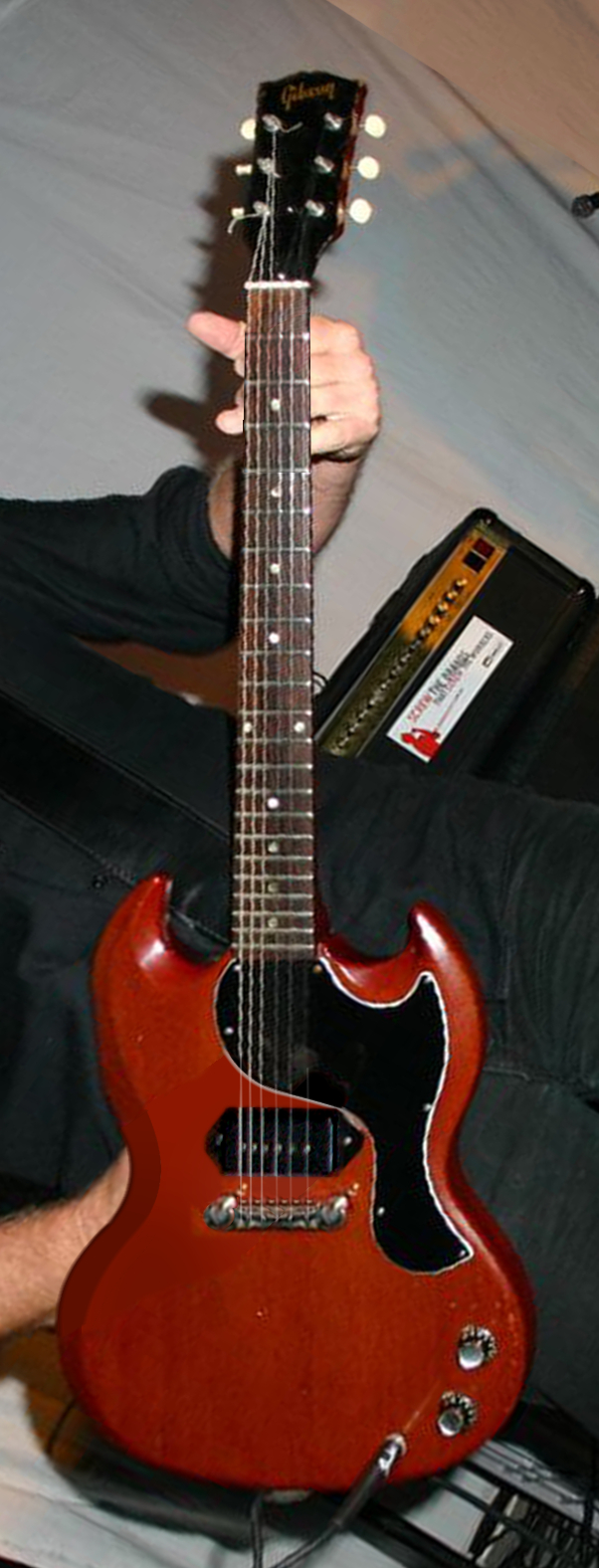
SG Junior

early-1970s models

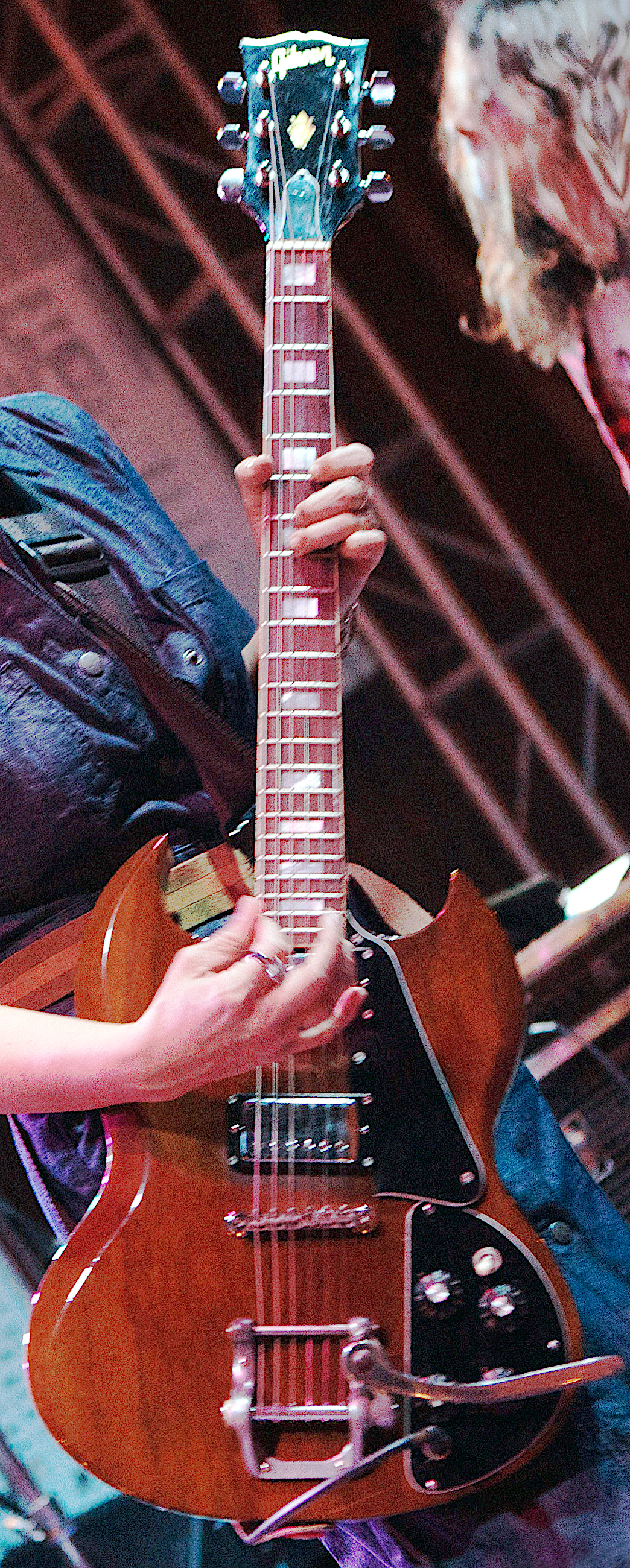
SG Deluxe (1971–72)

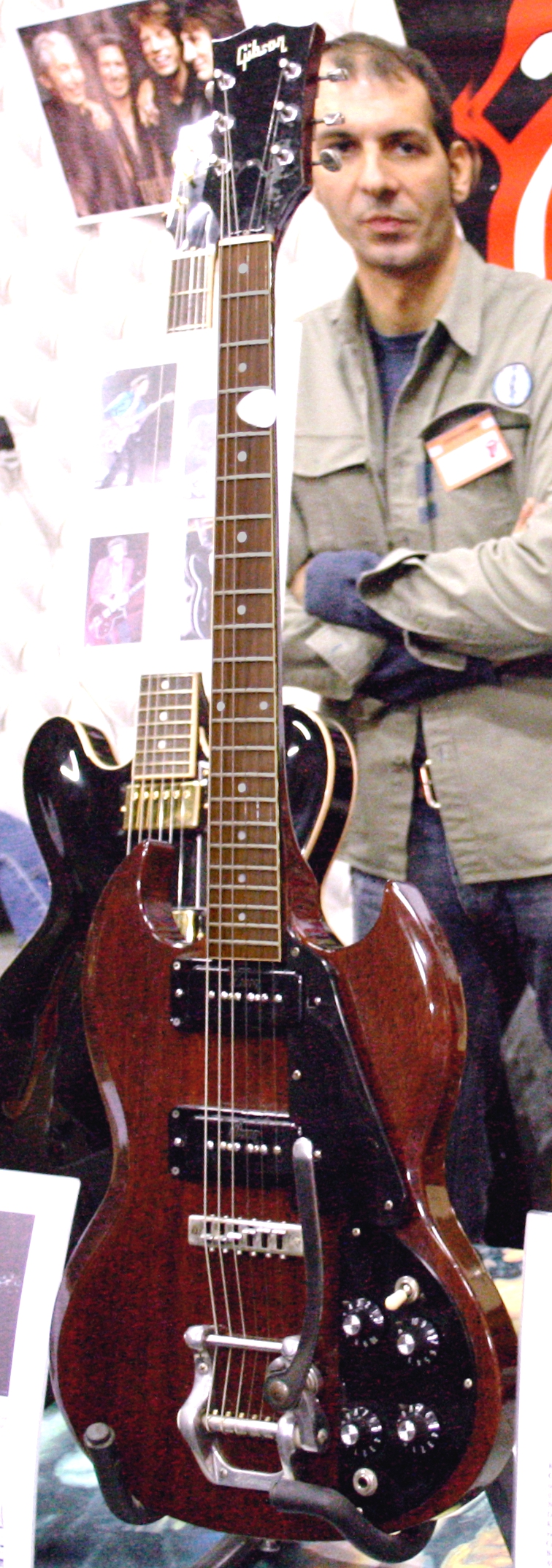
SG Pro (1971–72)

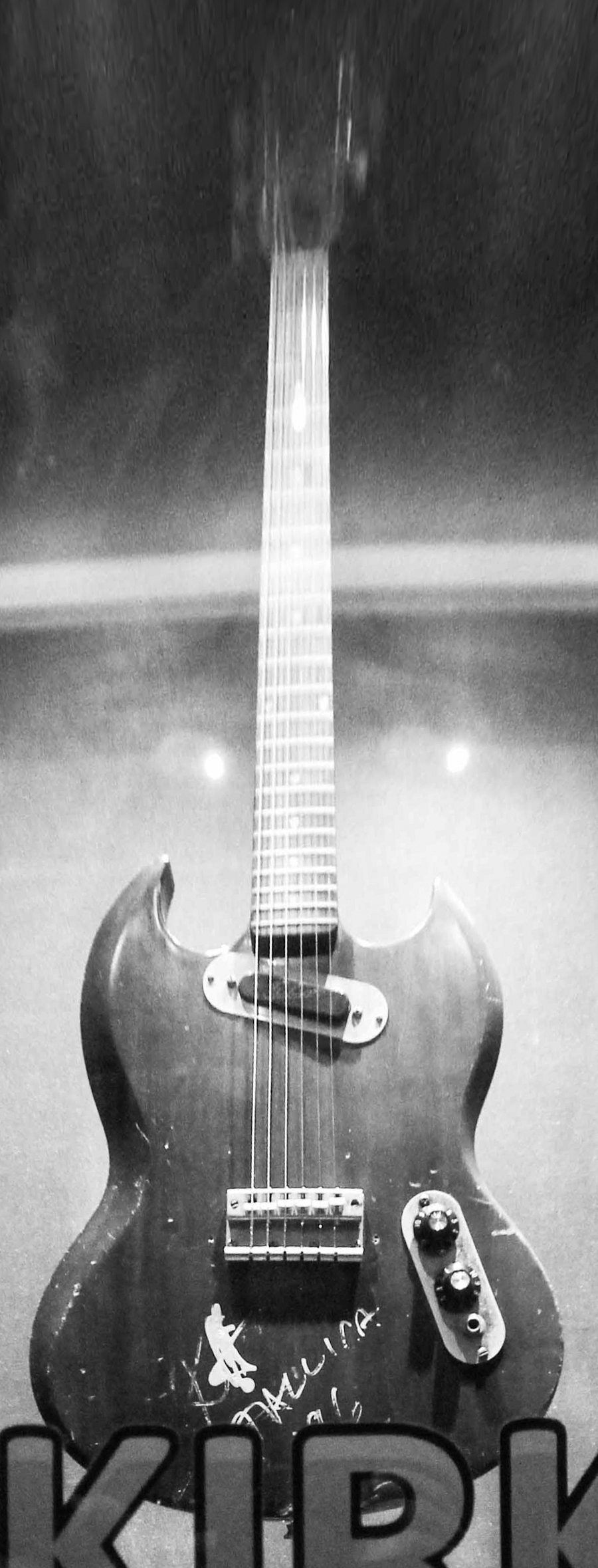
SG-100 (1971–72)

Recent models

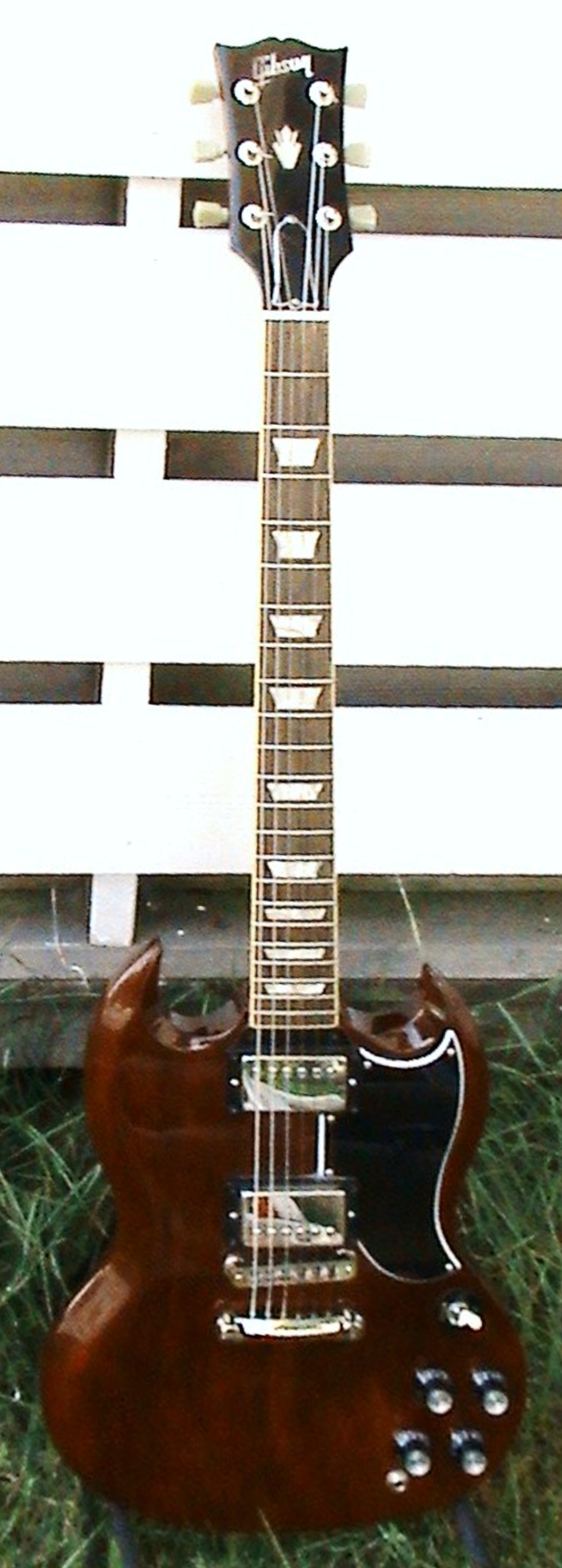
2007 SG '61 reissue

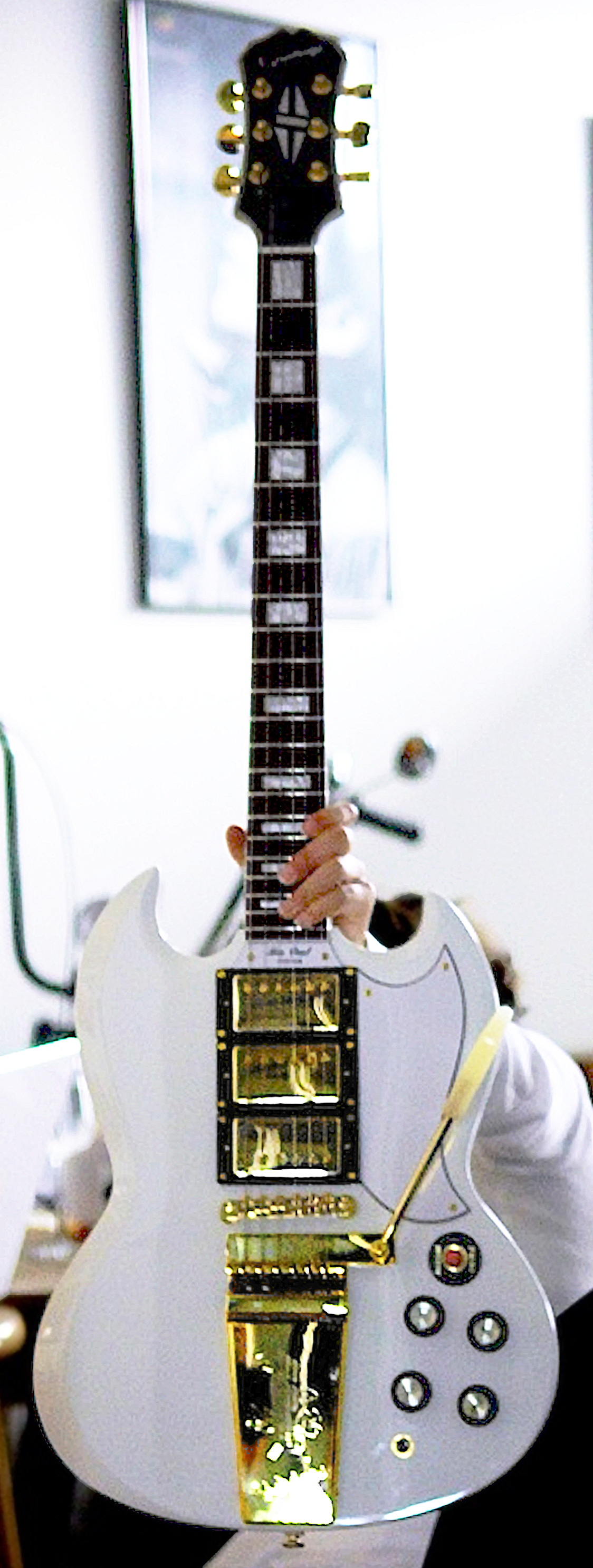
SG Custom '63 reissue

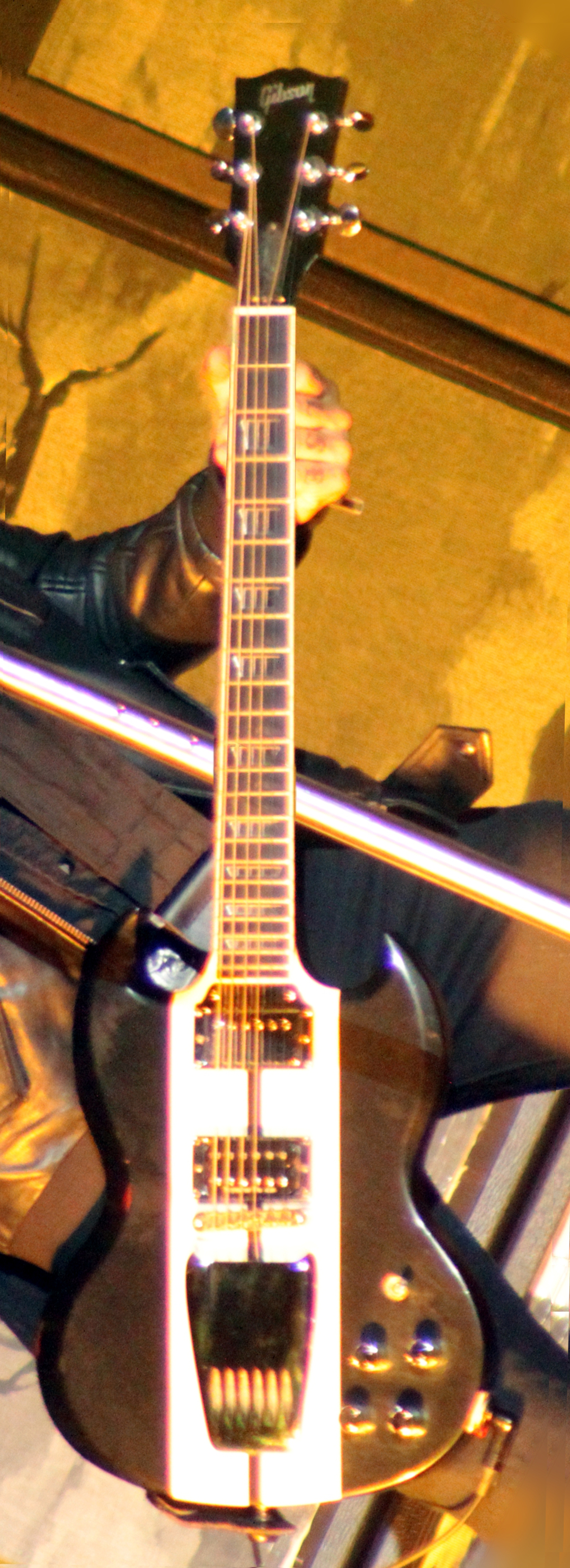
SG GT (2006)

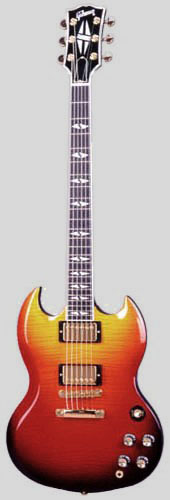
SG Supreme

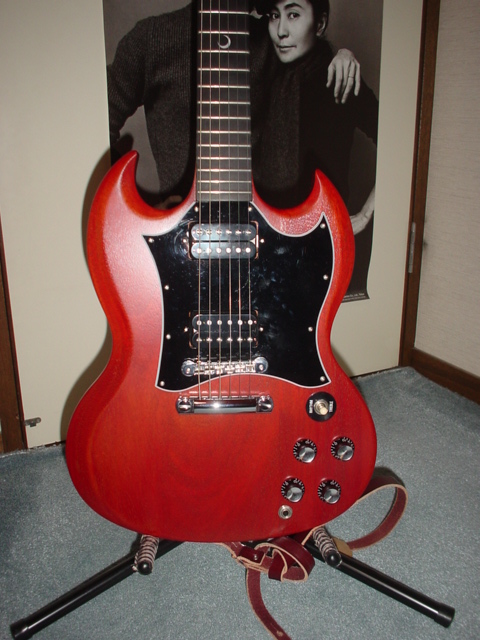
SG Faded Special (batwing pickguard)

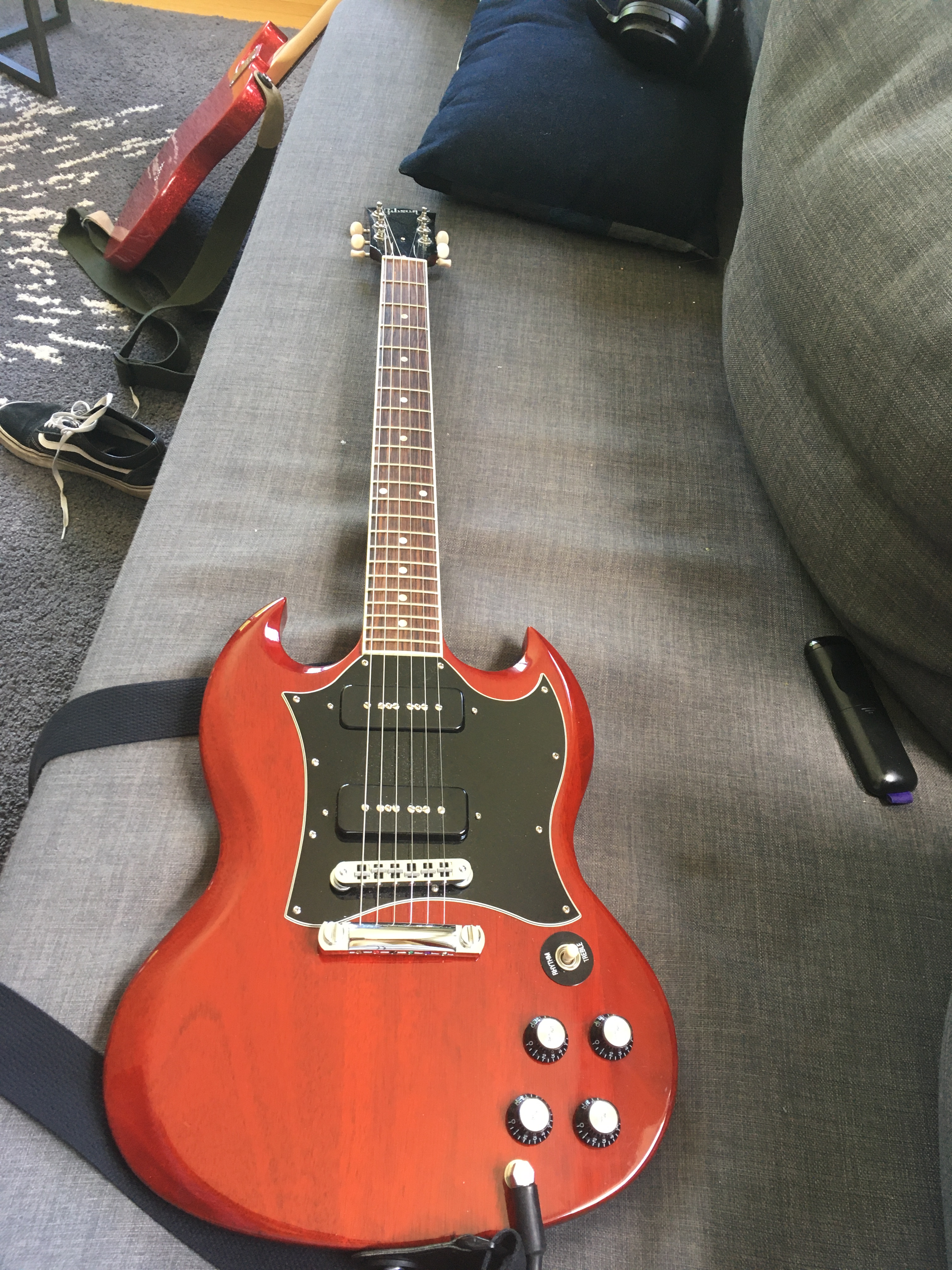
2009 SG Classic with P90 pickups

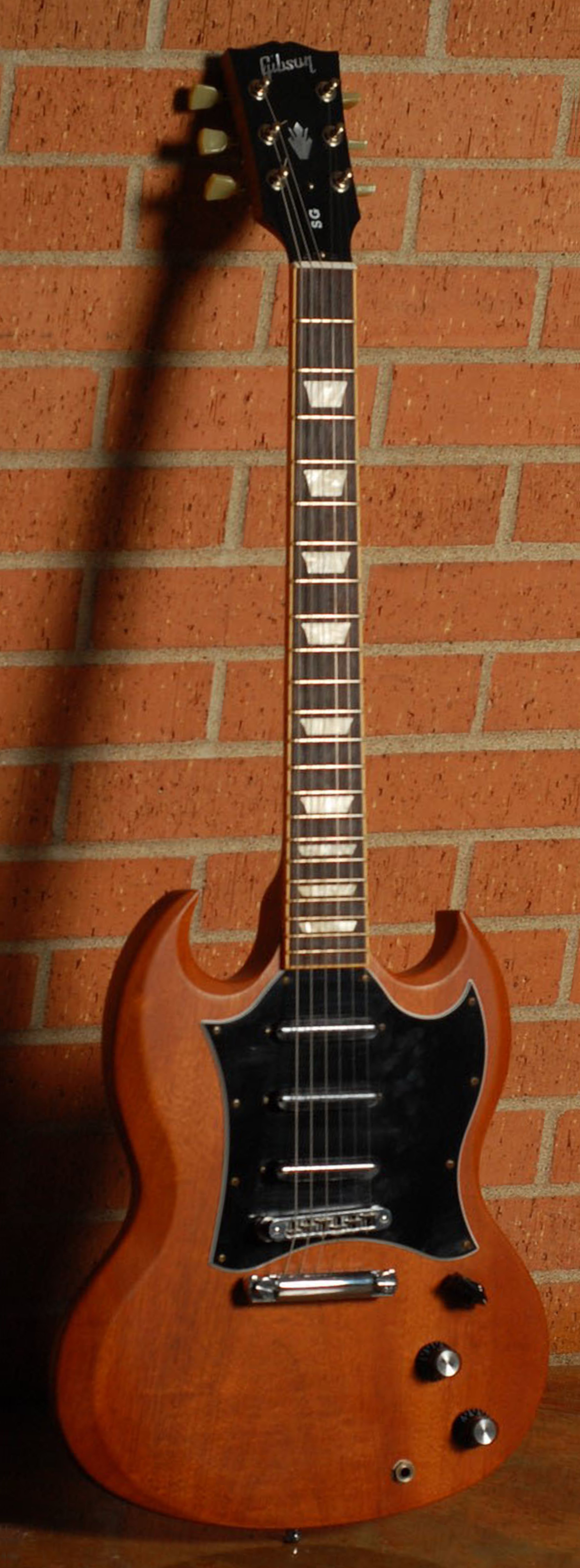
SG 3 (2007)

At the launch of the SG in 1961, Gibson offered four variants of the SG; the SG Junior (a stripped-down version of the standard, analogous to the Les Paul Junior), the SG Special, the SG Standard, and the top-of-the-line SG Custom.

As of 2010 Gibson's current core variants were the SG Standard and the SG Special. Over the years, Gibson has offered many variations of the SG, and continues to manufacture special editions, including models such as the Special and Faded Special, Supreme, Artist Signature SGs, Menace, and Gothic, as well as the premium-priced VOS reissues of the sixties SG Standard and Custom.

Models produced between 1961 and early 1966 have the original small pickguard; in late 1966 the guitar was redesigned slightly, first with a longer, more robust neck joint, and then came the modern larger semi-symmetrical "batwing" pickguard. This design continued until late 1971 or early 1972, when variations of the SG were sold with a raised Les Paul style pickguard and a front-mounted control plate. The low-end SG-100 and the P-90 equipped SG-200 appeared during this time, as well as the luxurious SG Pro and SG Deluxe guitars. Vibrato (tremolo arm) tailpieces were also introduced as options.

In 1972 the design went back to the original style pickguard and rear-mounted controls but with the neck then set further into the body, joining roughly at the 20th fret. By the end of the seventies, the SG models returned to the original sixties styling, and modern (1991–present) standard and special models have mostly returned to the 1967–1969 styling and construction, with a few exceptions; various reissues and other models of the SG still retain the original 1961–1967 styling.

In 1979, a low-cost SG made of walnut wood was introduced called "The SG." It had a clear finish and an ebony fingerboard and was accompanied by low-cost "Les Paul" and "ES 335" type guitars. "The Paul" was also made from walnut, but "The ES" was made out of solid mahogany (rather than the semi-solid body they usually produced). All three guitars were discontinued after about a year, replaced by the "firebrand" series, again made of mahogany. Also in 1979 a limited-edition model, the SG Exclusive was produced. Visually similar to the SG Standard of the time, the special features included an ebony fretboard, two Dirty Fingers humbucker pickups, and a master volume, two tone controls, and rotary coil tap that gradually eliminated one coil from each humbucker. The finish was black with cream color plastics and the truss rod cover read "Exclusive".

In 1980, the first SG manufactured with "active" factory pickups was introduced. Gibson experimented with an SG that included the same Moog active electronics that had previously been used in another Gibson model, the RD Artist. The resulting SG had a slightly thicker body to accommodate the extra circuitry, and was dubbed the "Gibson SG-R1". The SG-R1 was renamed the "SG Artist" in 1981, and was discontinued shortly afterwards. Approximately 200 active SGs were produced.

In 2008, Gibson introduced the Robot SG, which feature a motorized tuning system developed by Tronical. Limited-edition variants include the SG Robot Special and the limited-edition Robot SG LTD. The Robot system was designed to be convenient for players who need to frequently change tunings, without requiring them to manually tune or carry several guitars; however, they also carry a significant price premium.

Around 2000 through 2009, Gibson introduced the SG Classic, which harked back to a Junior/Special type design, with bound mahogany fret board with dot inlays and two P-90 pickups, with a thin '60s neck profile.

In 2009, Gibson introduced the Raw Power line of SGs, which have an all-maple body, unbound maple neck and fretboard, and unique colors not previously seen in SGs. These models are priced between the entry-level Specials and the more expensive Standards. The year 2009 also brought the Guitar Center-exclusive SG Standard with Coil Taps available in both 50s and 60s style necks.

In 2013 Gibson released the new Gibson SG Baritone. This SG comes in Alpine white and has 24 frets. It comes tuned down two and a half steps to B-E-A-D-F#-B. It is made with a full mahogany body, Richlite fretboard 496R (Ceramic) Bridge Position 500T (Ceramic) pickups and a tune-o-matic bridge.

Gibson's EB-3, EB-0, EDS-1275, and later model of Melody Maker and Kalamazoo also shared or once shared SG-shaped bodies, but these are not the members of the SG family.

Epiphone also offers a range of value-priced models, including a model with 1960s styling, sold as the G-400. These models often feature simpler construction than their Gibson counterparts, although they also often implement a number of features missing from production Gibson models; examples include the period-correct 1961 SG Special's wraparound bridge (unavailable on any Gibson SG Special production model as of 2013), the 22" scale SG Express, the metal-oriented Prophecy line (equipped with high-output humbuckers and unique inlays), and a replica of the Gibson EDS-1275, popularized by Jimmy Page.

== Unique SGs ==
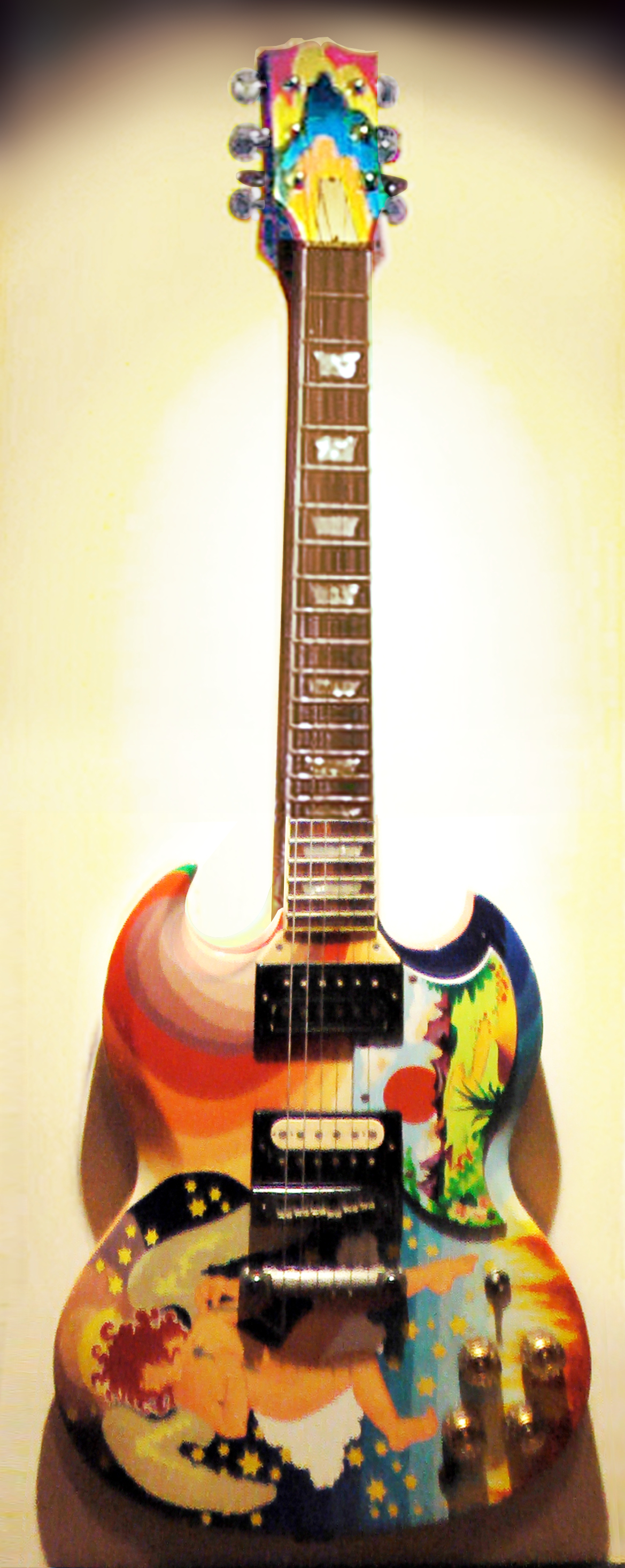
a replica of Eric Clapton's The Fool

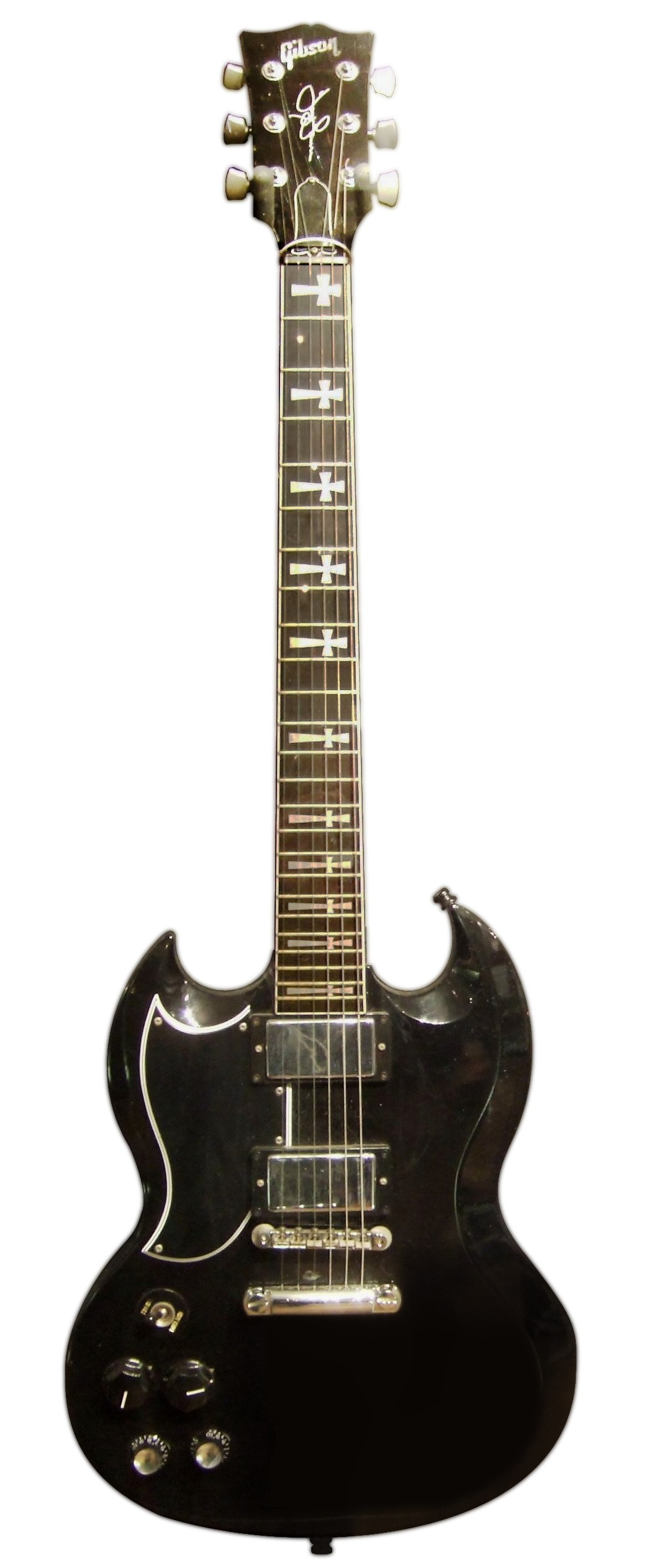
Tony Iommi's SG

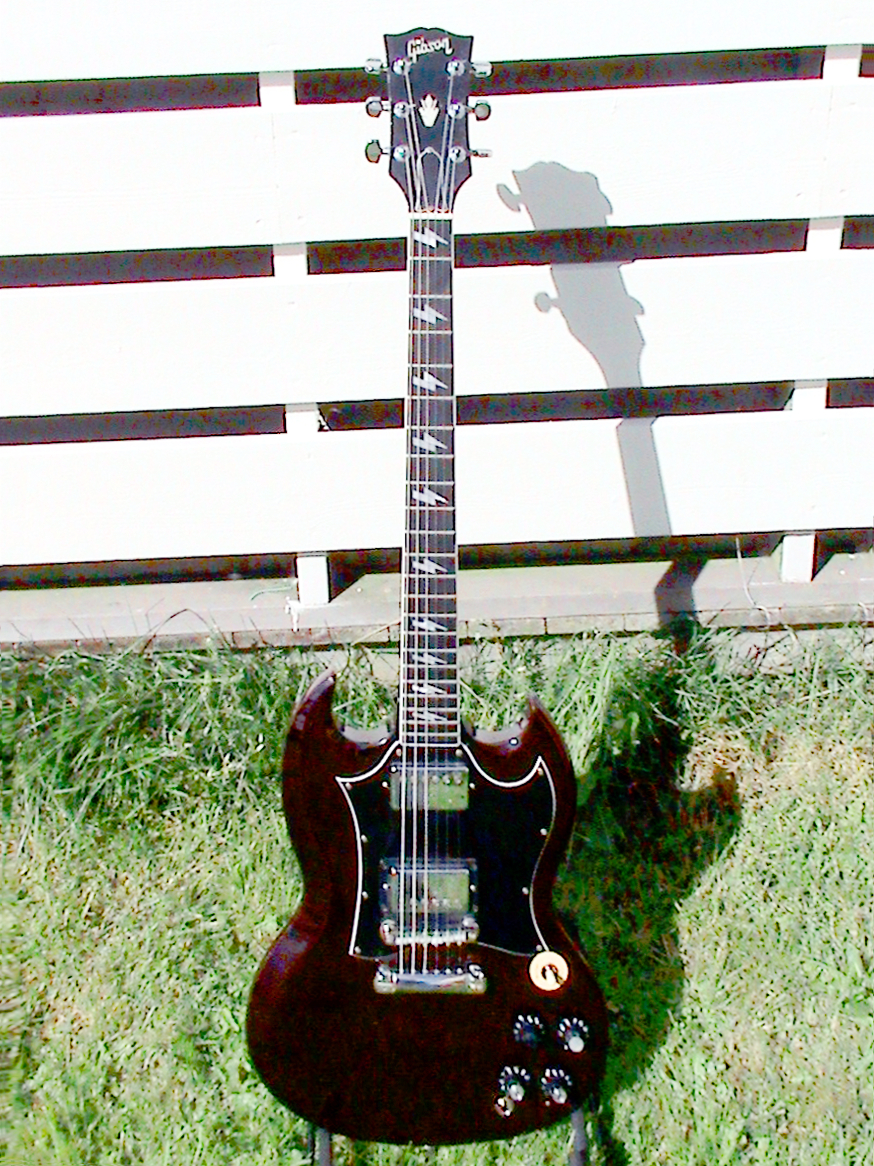
Angus Young SG model

- Sister Rosetta Tharpe played a white Gibson Les Paul SG with three humbucking pickups, customized with an old-style maestro vibrato.
- Angus Young of AC/DC occasionally uses a custom-made SG with lightning-bolt inlays, based on a custom model originally produced by luthier John Diggins. Since then, Young has collaborated with Gibson to make the Angus Young SG which features a custom-designed Humbucker in the bridge position, a '57 Classic in the neck position and the lightning-bolt inlays.
- Robby Krieger of The Doors used a Gibson SG Standard starting in 1965. Gibson produced a limited run of 150 SG's which incorporate many of Krieger's favorite components of various SG's.
- Eric Clapton used a 1964 Gibson SG Standard starting in 1967 while in Cream. This guitar was known as the "Fool" guitar, as it was painted by the Dutch artists known collectively as The Fool. In spring 1968, the SG was loaned to Jackie Lomax, an associate of George Harrison. The "Fool" was later sold to Todd Rundgren for $500 before eventually being sold to a private collector for about $500,000.
- Tony Iommi of Black Sabbath owns several custom-made black left-handed Gibson SGs with white cross-shaped fretboard inlays. Epiphone produced a similar guitar as the Tony Iommi G-400. Iommi's original SG (used on the early Sabbath albums) was a modified cherry red, left-handed 1964 SG Special with P-90 pickups which he nicknamed "Monkey" after he added a sticker of a monkey playing a fiddle to the guitar.
- John Cipollina of Quicksilver Messenger Service used a custom Gibson SG with custom pickguards in the shape of bat-like figures, as well as the fret board being customized with unique patterns.
- Mike Oldfield used a modified 1963 SG with a guitar synthesizer pickup to control a Roland GR300 Module for some of his guitar sounds on his 1980s albums such as 1983's Crises (including "Shadow on the Wall"), 1984's Discovery (including the title track) and 1987's Islands (including "The Wind Chimes") as well as single-only tracks from this period such as 1984's "In The Pool" and 1986's "Shine".
- Frank Iero has been seen with a Gibson SG Standard in the early days of My Chemical Romance, though later switching to Les Paul.
- In 1992, the Gibson Custom Shop introduced a "premium plus" reissue of the '67 SG. There was an estimated run of 100 of these instruments. It included three '57 humbuckers, ABR-1 bridge, ebony fingerboard, slim tapered neck and a mother-of-pearl block. There were no certificates issued from Gibson on this particular run.
- In 1998 Gibson introduced a rarer, higher-specification version of the SG Special—The SG Special Limited Edition. It came with an ebony fingerboard, factory gold hardware, and two gold array Humbuckers.
- The 2015 Eden of Coronet, which earned the title of the most valuable guitar in the world.

== Notable SG users ==
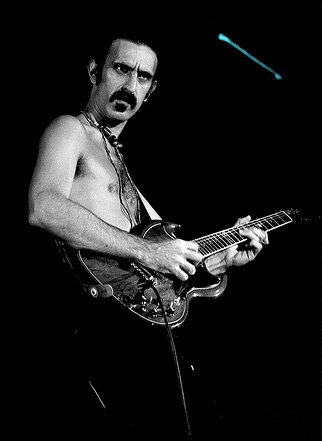
Frank Zappa

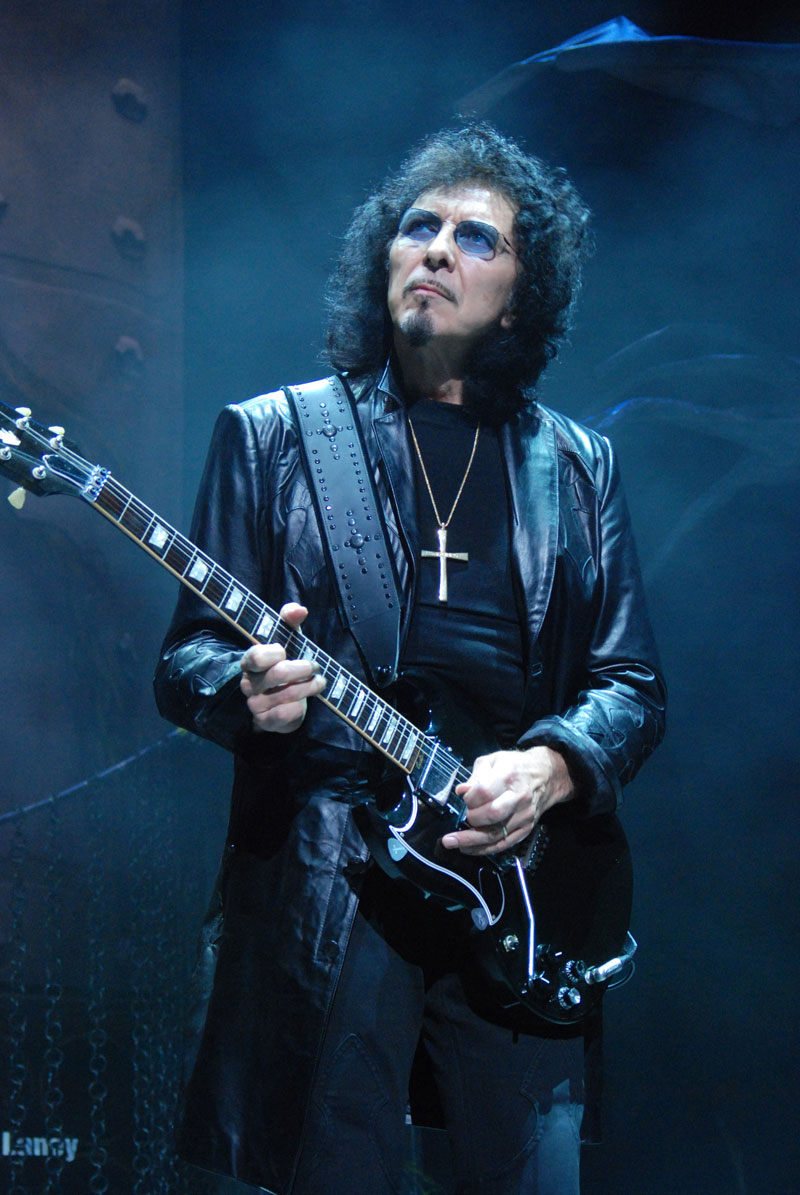
Tony Iommi

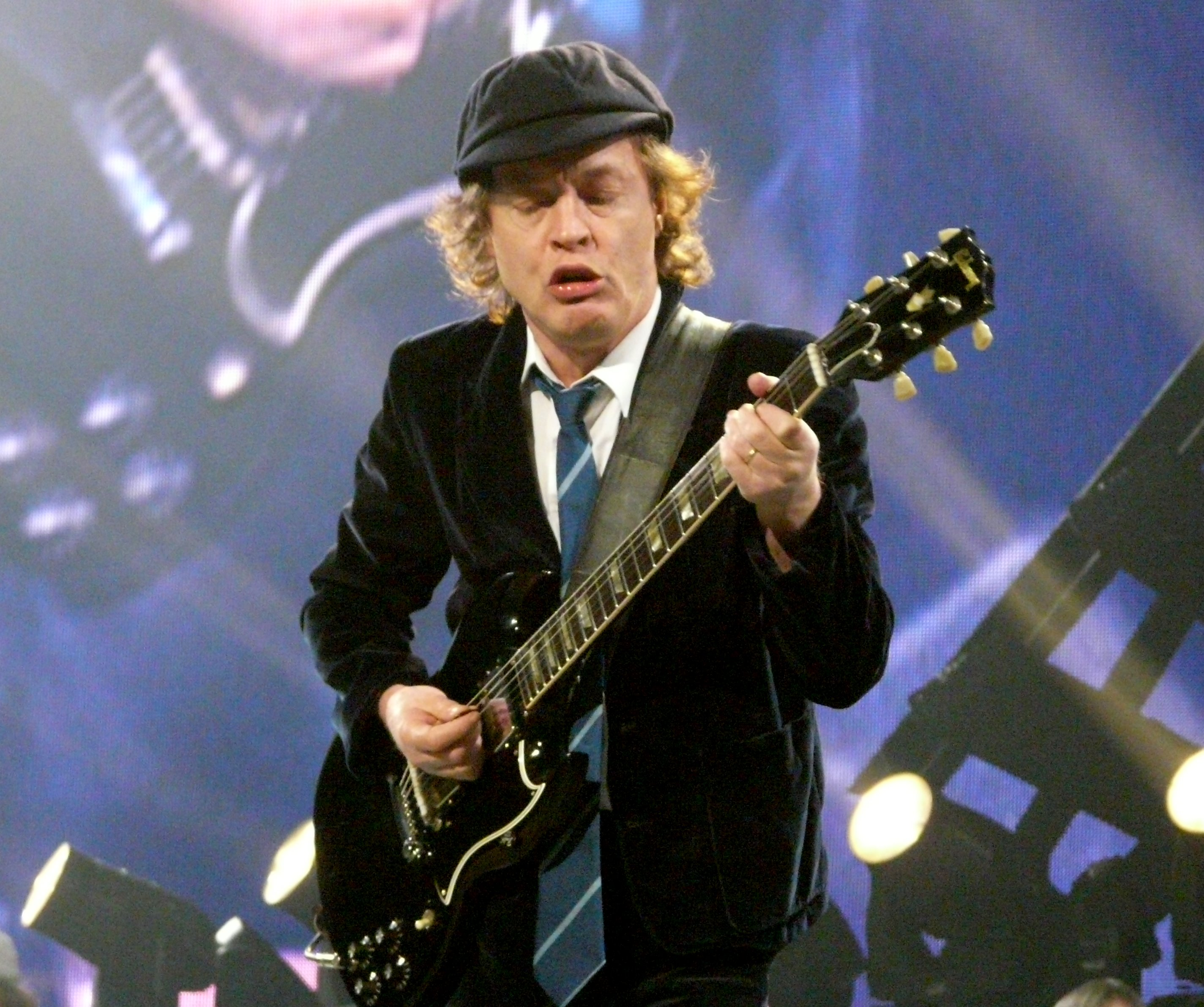
Angus Young

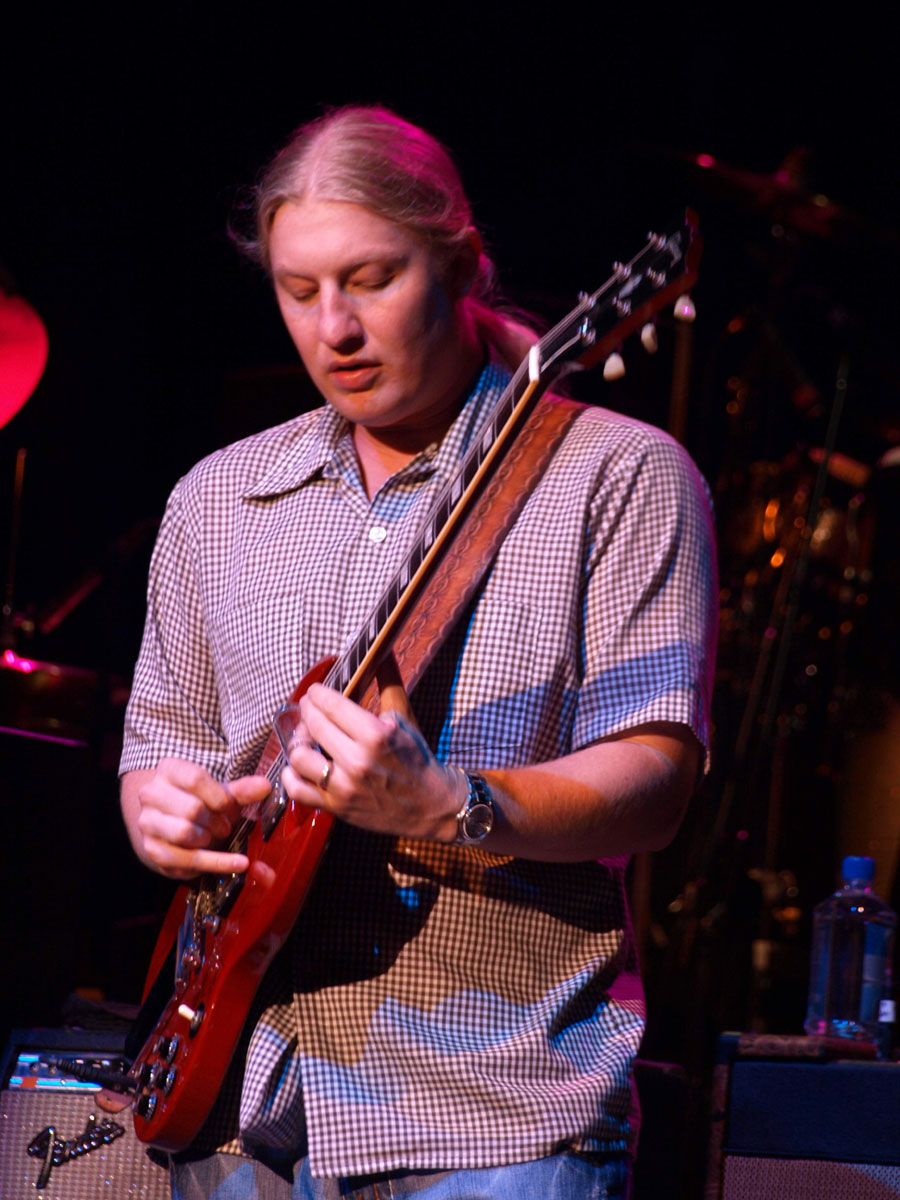
Derek Trucks

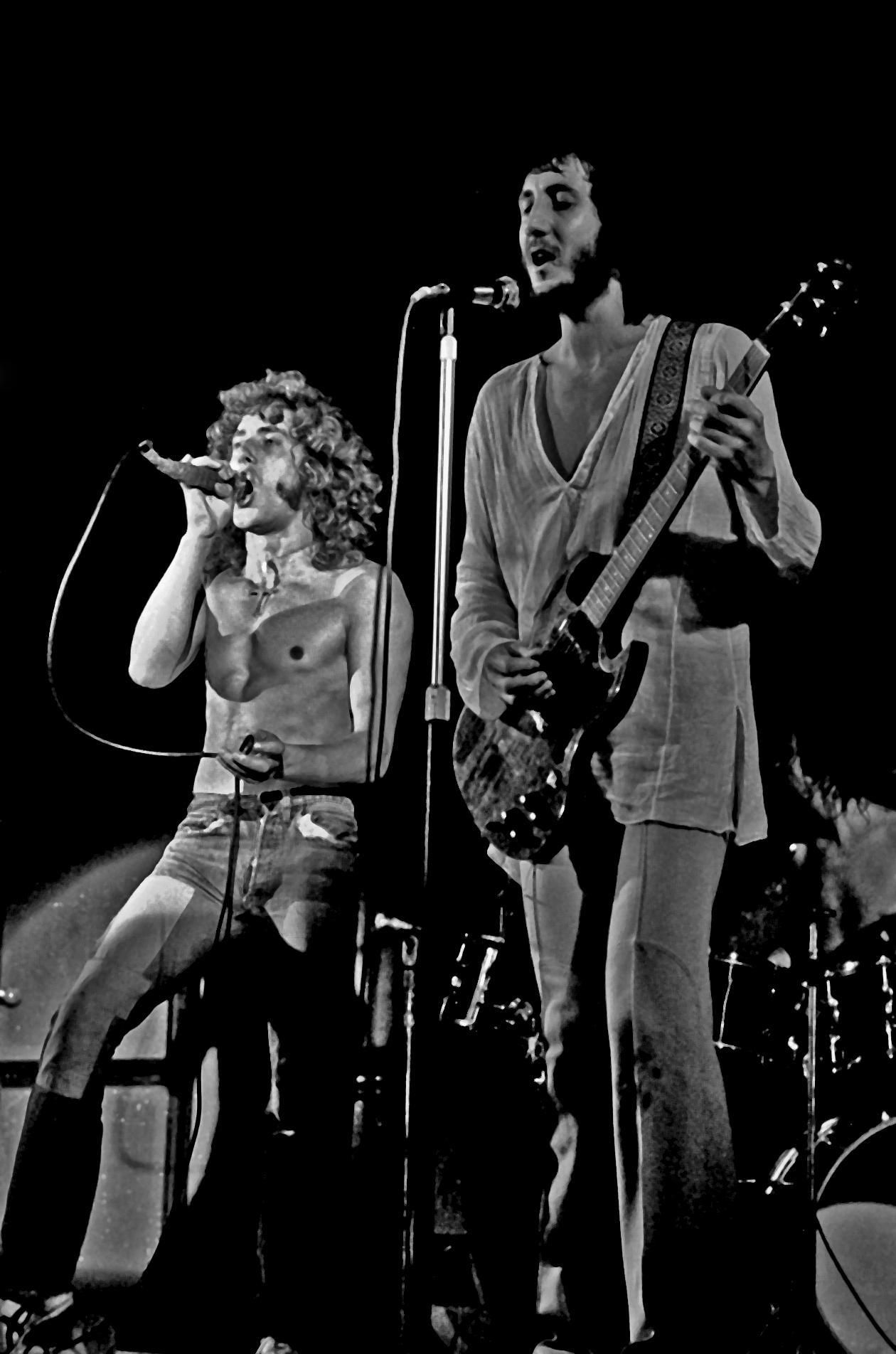
Pete Townshend

== See also ==
- Gibson Les Paul
  - Gibson Les Paul Special—the first model named "Gibson SG Special" (1959–1961).
- Gibson SG Special
- Gibson SG Junior
- Gibson EB-0
- Gibson EB-3
- Gibson EDS-1275
- Epiphone G-400
