= Cruel and Gentle Things =

Studio album by Charlie Sexton
- Released: September 13, 2005
- Genre: Rock
- Length: 44:09
- Label: Back Porch, Sony Music Distribution
- Producer: Lucinda Williams

Charlie Sexton chronology
Under the Wishing Tree (1995)	''Cruel and Gentle Things'' (2005)

Professional ratings
Review scores
Source	Rating
Allmusic	4.0/5 stars

Cruel and Gentle Things, released in 2005, is the fourth studio album released by singer/guitarist Charlie Sexton.

== Track listing ==
All tracks are written by Charlie Sexton.

No.	Title	Length
1.	"Gospel"	4:37
2.	"Burn"	4:13
3.	"I Do The Same For You"	4:39
4.	"Cruel And Gentle Things"	3:16
5.	"Bring It Home Again"	5:14
6.	"Once In A While"	3:01
7.	"Just Like Love"	5:18
8.	"Regular Grind"	4:27
9.	"Dillingham Lane"	4:51
10.	"It Don't Take Long"	4:33
Total length:		44:09

== Personnel ==
- Charlie Sexton - 6-String Bass, Cello, Composer, Drum Loop, Drums, Engineer, Guitar (12 String Acoustic), Guitar (Acoustic), Guitar (Baritone), Guitar (Bass), Guitar (Electric), Guitar (Rickenbacker), Guitar Loops, Keyboards, Mando-Guitar, Mellotron, Mixing, National Steel Guitar, Organ (Hammond), Percussion, Percussion Programming, Photography, Piano, Primary Artist, Producer, Pump Organ, Remixing, Tambourine, Vocals
- Michael Ramon - Harmonium, Organ (Hammond)
- Kevin Lovejoy - Mellotron, Moog Synthesizer, Wurlitzer
- Shannon McNally - Producer, Vocal Harmony
- Jerry Jones - 6-String Bass, Vocals
