= Singularity (Robby Krieger album) =

Studio album by Robby Krieger
- Released: 14 June 2010
- Genre: Jazz rock
- Length: 48:59
- Label: Oglio
- Producer: Arthur Barrow, Robby Krieger

Robby Krieger chronology
Cinematix (2000)	Singularity (2010)	In Session (2017)

Singularity is the sixth solo album by Robby Krieger, former guitarist for The Doors. The album was released in 2010. Singularity was nominated in the 53rd Grammy Awards for best Pop Instrumental Album.

== Track listing ==
All tracks composed by Robby Krieger and Arthur Barrow; except where indicated

1. "Russian Caravan (Intro)" (Krieger)
2. "Russian Caravan"
3. "Southern Cross"
4. "Event Horizon (Intro)" (Krieger)
5. "Event Horizon"
6. "Coffin Dodger"
7. "Trane Running Late"
8. "Let It Slide"
9. "Solar Wind" (Krieger, Dale Alexander)
10. "House of Bees"
