= Versions (Robby Krieger album) =

Studio album by Robby Krieger
- Released: 1982
- Recorded: 1982
- Studio: Mad Dog Studios, Venice, California
- Genre: Jazz rock
- Producer: Robby Krieger

Robby Krieger chronology
Robbie Krieger & Friends (1977)	Versions (1982)	Robby Krieger (1985)

Versions is the second solo studio album by Robby Krieger, former guitarist for The Doors. The album was released in 1982.

== Track listing ==
1. "Tattooed Love Boys" (Chrissie Hynde)
2. "Her Majesty" (Krieger)
3. "East End, West End" (Eric Gale)
4. "The Crystal Ship" (The Doors)
5. "Street Fighting Man" (Mick Jagger, Keith Richards)
6. "Reach Out (I'll Be There)" (Holland-Dozier-Holland)
7. "Gavin Leggit" (Krieger, Arthur Barrow, Mac MacKenzie)
8. "Underwater Fall" (Krieger)
9. "I'm Gonna Tell on You" (Krieger)
10. "Harlem Nocturne" (Earle Hagen)

== Personnel ==
Musicians

- Robby Krieger – guitar, slide guitar, vocals
- Ray Manzarek – keyboards on "Her Majesty" and "Crystal Ship"
- John Densmore – drums, percussion on "Her Majesty" and "Crystal Ship", timbales on "I'm Gonna Tell On You"
- Lisa Brennis – bass on "I'm Gonna Tell On You"
- Don Preston – keyboards on "Street Fighting Man"
- Arthur Barrow – bass, keyboards
- Bruce Gary – drums, percussion
- Deric Roberts – drums on "I'm Gonna Tell On You"
- Larry Zack – drums on "Harlem Nocturne"
- Greg Romeo – percussion on "Crystal Ship"
- Sal Marquez – percussion on "Tattooed Love Boys"
- Sam Riney – saxophone on "I'm Gonna Tell On You"

Production

- Robby Krieger – producer
- Linda Kyriazi – producer
- Mark Avnet – engineer
