= Pictures for Pleasure =

Studio album by Charlie Sexton
- Released: 1985
- Studios: Conway (Hollywood, California); Oasis (Canoga Park, California)
- Genres: Rock; new wave
- Length: 40:46
- Label: MCA
- Producer: Keith Forsey

Charlie Sexton chronology
Pictures for Pleasure (1985)	Charlie Sexton (1989)

Professional ratings
Review scores
Source	Rating
Allmusic	4.0/5 stars

Pictures for Pleasure is the debut studio album released by singer/guitarist Charlie Sexton in 1985. The album was the first solo effort by the then 16-year-old Austin-based musician, who had already secured a reputation as a skilled guitarist.

Pictures for Pleasure combines Sexton's blues rock roots and the more commercially acceptable new wave genre. The album produced the Billboard Hot 100 #17 hit "Beat's So Lonely".

A poster reproducing the album cover appears on the wall of Ferris Bueller's bedroom in the 1986 John Hughes film Ferris Bueller's Day Off. The song "Beat's So Lonely" was featured in the 1987 film Some Kind of Wonderful, which was written and produced by Hughes.

== Critical reception ==
Cash Box magazine said "With a rich and roaring vocal typical of Forsey's production, as well as some stinging guitar leads, Charlie Sexton is definitely a musician/performer to be reckoned with. Though still in his teens, the sound is fully mature and Sexton is primed for teen star status."

== Track listing ==
1. "Impressed" (Steve Krikorian, Robert Wilson) – 4:19
2. "Beat's So Lonely" (Keith Forsey, Sexton) – 5:10
3. "Restless" (Sexton, Andrew Williams)– 4:57
4. "Hold Me" (Little Jack Little, David Oppenheim, Ira Schuster) – 4:27
5. "Pictures for Pleasure" (Nigel Harrison, Sexton) – 4:56
6. "Tell Me" (Sexton) – 4:11
7. "Attractions" (Sexton) – 4:27
8. "You Don't Belong Here" (Steve Krikorian) – 4:52
9. "Space" (Mike Chapman, Holly Knight) – 3:27

== Personnel ==
- Charlie Sexton - bass, guitar, piano, keyboards, programming, vocals
- Merchant Bankers - backing vocals
- Arthur Barrow - bass, keyboards, programming
- Dave Concors - engineer
- Keith Forsey - programming, producer
- Mick Guzauski - engineer
- Steve Schiff - guitar
- Alex Martinez - drums, groupie
- Scott Wilk - keyboards
- Richie Zito - guitar
- Michael Frondelli - mixing

== Charts ==
Chart (1986)	Peak position
Australia (Kent Music Report)	26
US Billboard 200	15
