= Robby Krieger (album) =

Studio album by Robby Krieger
- Released: 1985
- Studio: Variety Arts Center, Los Angeles, California
- Genre: Jazz rock
- Length: 35:18
- Label: Cafe Records
- Producer: Robby Krieger

Robby Krieger chronology
| Versions (1982) | Robby Krieger (1985) | No Habla (1989) |

Robby Krieger is the third solo studio album by Robby Krieger, former guitarist for The Doors. The album was released in 1985, and is entirely instrumental.

== Track listing ==
1. "Bag Lady" (Don Preston) – 9:00
2. "Reggae Funk" (Krieger) – 4:19
3. "Bass Line Street" (Krieger) – 3:51
4. "Costa Brava" (Krieger) – 3:24
5. "Noisuf" (Arthur Barrow, Krieger) – 14:44

== Personnel ==
- Robby Krieger – guitar
- Arthur Barrow – bass
- Bruce Gary – drums
- Don Preston – keyboards
