= No Habla =

Studio album by Robby Krieger
- Released: December 1989
- Recorded: 1989
- Genre: Jazz rock
- Length: 34:59
- Label: I.R.S.
- Producer: Bruce Botnick

Robby Krieger chronology
Robby Krieger (1985)	No Habla (1989)	Door Jams (1989)

No Habla is the fourth solo album by Robby Krieger, former guitarist for The Doors. The album was released in 1989 on I.R.S. Records.

== Track listing ==
1. "Wild Child" (The Doors) 4:43
2. "Eagles Song" (Krieger) 2:33
3. "It's Gonna Work Out Fine" (Ike Turner) 4:01
4. "Lonely Teardrops" (Tyran Carlo, Gwen Fuqua, Berry Gordy) 2:46
5. "Love It or Leave It" (Krieger) 4:58
6. "The Big Hurt (Dolores)" (Wayne Shanklin) 5:06
7. "Piggy's Song" (Krieger) 3:38
8. "I Want You, I Need You, I Love You" (Ira Kosloff, Maurice Mysels) 3:32
9. "You're Lost Little Girl" (The Doors) 3:42

== Personnel ==
Musicians

- Robby Krieger – bass, guitar, keyboards, vocals
- Arthur Barrow – bass, guitar, keyboards, programming
- Brian Auger – keyboards
- David Woodford – keyboards
- Skip Vanwinkle – keyboards
- Jack Conrad – bass
- John Avila – bass
- Gary Mallaber – drums
- John "Vatos" Hernandez – drums
- Bruce Gary – drums, percussion
- Scott Gordon – drums, harmonica, harp

Production

- Robby Krieger – producer
- Bruce Botnick – producer
- Danny St. Pierre – engineer
- Scott Gordon – engineer, producer, mixing
- Stephen Marcussen – mastering
