= Robbie Krieger & Friends =

Studio album by Robby Krieger
- Released: 1977
- Studios: Devonshire Sound Studios, North Hollywood; Studio 55, Los Angeles
- Genre: Jazz rock
- Label: Blue Note
- Producer: Robby Krieger

Robby Krieger chronology
Robbie Krieger & Friends (1977)	Versions (1982)

Robbie Krieger & Friends is the first solo studio album by Robby Krieger, former guitarist for The Doors. The album was released in 1977. He also designed the album cover art.

== Background ==
After The Doors disbanded in 1973, Krieger was a member of Butts Band which disbanded in 1975. He then performed solo with a major departure in style. The album received mixed reviews.

== Track listing ==
=== Side one ===
1. "Gumpopper" (Sal Marquez, Robby Krieger) - 3:37
2. "Uptown" (Robby Krieger) - 3:54
3. "Every Day" (Robby Krieger) - 5:04
4. "Marilyn Monroe" (Robby Krieger) - 4:55

=== Side two ===
1. "The Ally" (Sal Marquez, Robby Krieger) - 6:28
2. "Low Bottomy" (Robby Krieger) - 2:58
3. "Spare Change" (Robby Krieger) - 3:38
4. "Big Oak Basin" (Gary Barone) - 4:55

== Personnel ==
- Bass – Bob Glaub (track: 8), Ken Wild (tracks: 2,6,7), Reggie McBride (tracks: 1,3,4,7), Sal Marquez (track: 8)
- Bongos – Eddie Talamantes (tracks: 7,8)
- Clavichord – Ron Stockert (track: 1), Sal Marquez (tracks: 3,5,6,7)
- Congas – Perico (tracks: 5,7)
- Drums – Bruce Gary (tracks: 2,5,6,7), Ed Greene (tracks: 1,3,4,8), John Densmore (track: 4)
- Guitar – Robby Krieger
- Organ – Greg Mathieson (tracks: 2,8), Jimmy Smith (track: 4), Stu Goldberg (track:5,6,7)
- Piano – Sal Marquez (track: 8)
- Saxophone – Joel Peskin (tracks: 1,2,3,5,8), piccolo flute (track: 2)
- Synthesizer – Sal Marquez (tracks: 1,4,6,7), Stu Goldberg (tracks: 5,6,7)
- Timbales – Eddie Talamantes (track: 5)
- Timpani – Bruce Gary (tracks: 2, 7)
- Trombone – Jock Ellis (tracks: 1,2,5,8)
- Trumpet – Gary Barone (tracks: 5,8), Sal Marquez (tracks: 2,3,5,8)
- Vocals – Afreeka Trees (tracks: 2,3,4), Robby Krieger (tracks: 3,4), Sharon Robinson (tracks: 2,3,4)
