= Gibson SG Junior =

Type of electric guitar

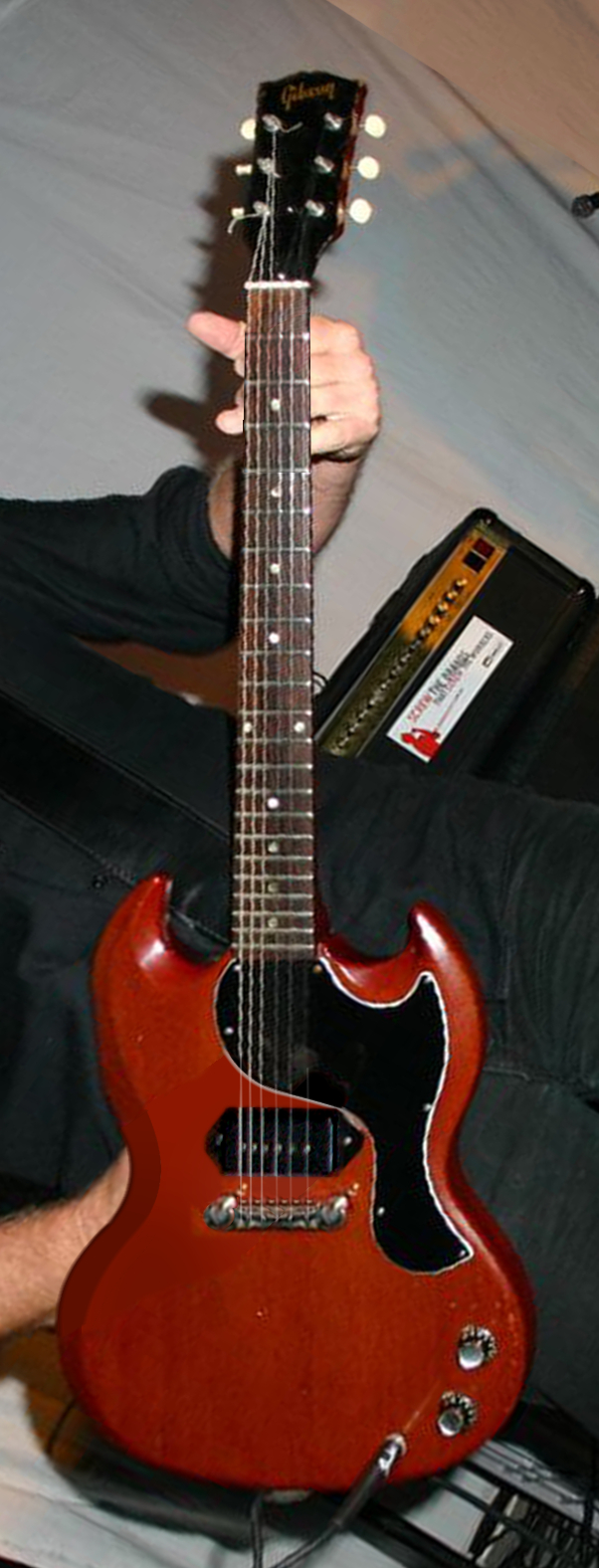
- Manufacturer: Gibson
- Period: 1961–1971, 1999-2001, 2011-2015, 2018-present

Construction
- Body type: Solid
- Neck joint: Set
- Scale: 24.75"

Woods
- Body: Mahogany
- Neck: Mahogany
- Fretboard: 22-fret – Ebony or Rosewood

Hardware
- Bridge: Fixed stoptail
- Pickup(s): 1 P-90

The Gibson SG Junior is a solid-bodied electric guitar manufactured by Gibson from the early 1960s to the early 1970s. Like its earlier sister, the Gibson Les Paul Junior, it had been created for sale at a lower price. It is known for its single P-90 treble pickup, and the single piece 'wrap-around' bridge instead of the two-piece tune-o-matic bridge and tails-stop arrangement found on the SG Standard. From 1961 to 1963, it was branded with the "Les Paul Junior" name. In 1963, "Les Paul" was removed from the headstock and it was officially called the SG Junior. From 1966 to 1971, it had a generic SG pickguard with a soapbar P90 rather than the original dog-ear. It was discontinued in 1971.

As a successor model, SG 100 was released in the late-1971 (with a large maple body, triangular pickguard, flat metal control plate, a black plastic-molded single-coil pickup with a flat metal-ring, and tune-o-matic installed through a baseplate/tailpiece), then SG I replaced it in the late-1972 (with a humbucker and stoptail bridge), but discontinued in 1974.

The late 1960s version was re-issued by Gibson between 1999 and 2001. Between 2011 and 2015 Gibson rereleased a Junior which more closely resembled its early 1960s incarnation.

== See also ==
- Gibson Les Paul Junior
- Gibson SG
