= Charlie Sexton =

American guitarist (born 1968)

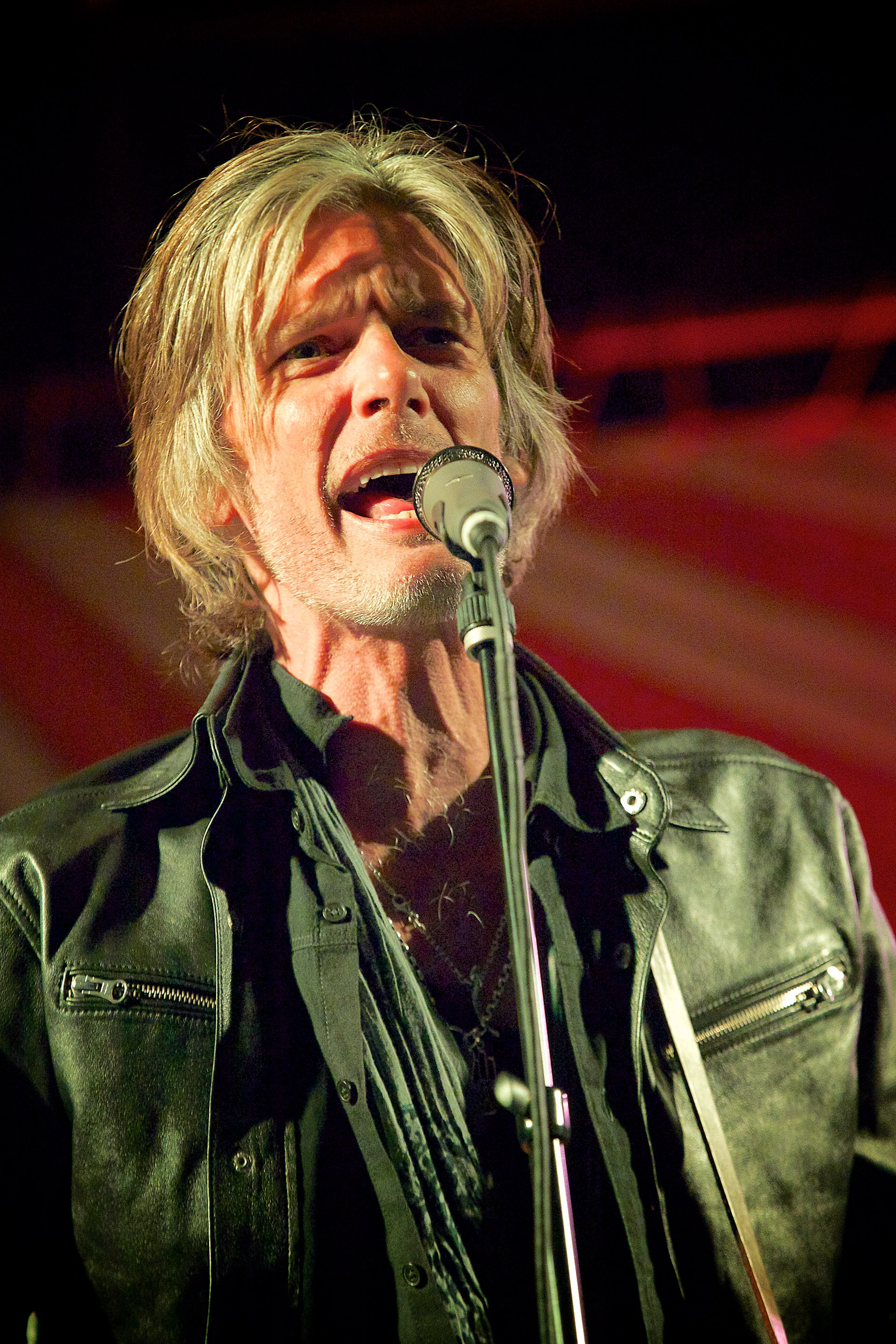

Background information
- Born: Charles Wayne Sexton; August 11, 1968 (age 58)
- Origin: Austin, Texas, U.S.
- Genres: Blues rock; rock; blues; new wave (early work)
- Occupations: Musician; producer
- Instruments: Guitar; vocals
- Years active: 1982–present
- Labels: Back Porch; MCA

Charles Wayne Sexton is an American guitarist, singer and songwriter. Though Sexton is best known for his 1985 album Pictures for Pleasure and as a guitarist in Bob Dylan's band, he has also become well known as a music producer. Sexton co-founded Arc Angels and created the Charlie Sexton Sextet. He was still a teenager when he gained fame for his 1985 hit, "Beat's So Lonely", from his debut studio album, Pictures for Pleasure.

== Biography ==
When he was four, Charlie and his mother relocated from San Antonio, Texas to Austin—where clubs such as the Armadillo World Headquarters, Soap Creek Saloon, the Split Rail and Antone's exposed him to popular music. He moved back to Austin at age 12 after a brief period living outside Austin with his mother. When Charlie and his brother, Will Sexton, were still young boys, they were taught how to play guitar by Austin legend W. C. Clark—known as the "Godfather of Austin Blues."

=== Early successes ===
Charlie's first band was the Groovemasters, fronted by Lubbock native R.C. Banks. Under the moniker Little Charlie, he played about 16 dates with the Joe Ely Band in June 1982, after guitarist Jesse Taylor broke some bones in his hand. An observer at the time commented, "Several older guitar players are somewhat miffed but the chemistry is A+".

Sexton performed under the name Guitar Charles Sexton on Juvenile Junk, a five-song EP by the group Maxwell (a.k.a. the Eager Beaver Boys) in 1983.

Sexton released his debut full-length album Pictures for Pleasure in 1985. Recorded in Los Angeles when he was 16, it yielded the Top-20 hit single "Beat's So Lonely". Jon Pareles of the New York Times described him as "a teen idol singing David Bowie-style rock during the years he was promoted by MTV". The album spent 34 weeks on Billboard magazine's Billboard 200 albums chart, reaching No. 15. It also spawned three Australian Top-100 singles—with "Beat's So Lonely" peaking at No. 17. The song was featured in the movie Some Kind of Wonderful, but was not included on the commercial soundtrack.

Sexton was an occasional opening act for David Bowie on his Glass Spider Tour in 1987, and appears on the Glass Spider video playing guitar on The Stooges' "I Wanna Be Your Dog" and the Velvet Underground's "White Light/White Heat".

While he was still in his late teens, Sexton became a popular session player—recording with artists such as Ronnie Wood, Keith Richards, Don Henley, Jimmy Barnes and Bob Dylan.

He also recorded My Time with the artist who gave him his start—R.C. Banks.

=== Other projects ===
Sexton worked for a time with his brother Will Sexton in 1988. Will and the Kill released a 38-minute, self-titled album featuring both Sexton and Jimmie Vaughan. The album was recorded at Fire Station Studios in San Marcos, Texas, with Joe Ely producing, and released via MCA Records.

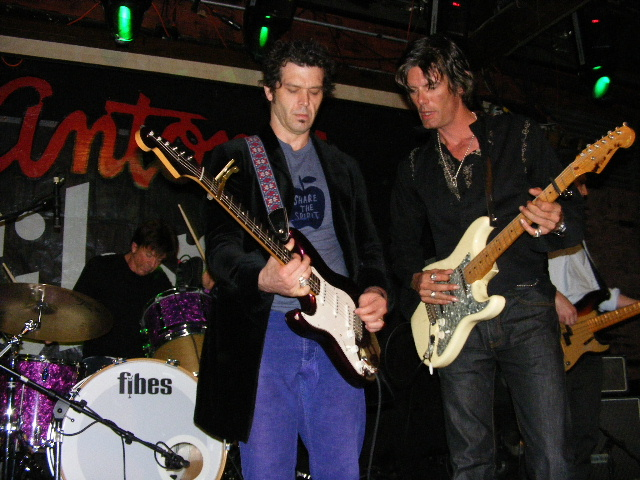
Sexton (right) performing with Arc Angels in 2009

Sexton later contributed songs to various motion picture soundtracks, including True Romance and Air America—and made a cameo fronting a bar band in Thelma & Louise.

In 1992, Sexton formed the Arc Angels with Doyle Bramhall II (son of Doyle Bramhall, one of Stevie Ray Vaughan's writing partners), and Vaughan's Double Trouble rhythm section, composed of bassist Tommy Shannon and drummer Chris "Whipper" Layton. The name originally was spelled as ARC Angels, named for the Austin Rehearsal Complex, where they practiced. The blues-rock band released a self-titled album on Geffen Records that same year. The Steven Van Zandt-produced disc was well received by fans and critics, but the band broke up in less than three years.

Sexton formed the Charlie Sexton Sextet in 1995 and recorded Under The Wishing Tree, released on MCA Records. Although sales were disappointing, it was met with critical acclaim. In the meantime, Sexton continued to perform with other artists—appearing on such notable albums as Lucinda Williams' Car Wheels on a Gravel Road and Shawn Colvin's Grammy-winning album A Few Small Repairs (uncredited).

=== Association with Bob Dylan ===
Sexton was hired by Bob Dylan to replace Bucky Baxter in 1999. Sexton had previously played with Dylan during a pair of Austin, Texas, concerts in 1991 and 1996, and on some demos recorded in 1983. Sexton's residency with Dylan from 1999 to 2002 brought him great exposure—with many critics singling out his interplay with Larry Campbell. The group, hailed as one of Dylan's best, recorded "Things Have Changed" (from the 2000 film Wonder Boys) and 2001's critically acclaimed album Love and Theft.

Duke Robillard took over on lead guitar in Dylan's touring band In 2013 but was let go after just 27 shows. Sexton and Colin Linden subsequently shared lead guitar duties for the band from July and into early August. By the European leg of the 2013 Never Ending Tour, Sexton again became the sole lead guitar player and remained so through the end of the touring year.

=== Other activity ===
Sexton continued working with other artists; in 2001, he produced Double Trouble's Been a Long Time, and Jimmie Vaughan's album Do You Get the Blues? (2001).

Sexton has produced numerous other works, including Edie Brickell's Volcano (2003), Jon Dee Graham's Great Battle (2004), Shannon McNally's Geronimo (2005), and Los Super Seven's Heard It on the X (2005).

He released his Cruel and Gentle Things album in late 2005.

He has continued his producing albums for other artists—including Canadian singer-songwriter Peter Elkas' 2007 release, Wall of Fire.

The Arc Angels began playing occasional reunion shows around Austin and Dallas in 2002. In 2009, the band announced it would tour with original members Layton and Bramhall, but not Shannon, who had health issues. The tour included England dates with Bramhall's sometime boss, Eric Clapton. The band also recorded the CD/DVD Living in a Dream, their second album in 17 years.

Sexton performed the Leonard Cohen song "Hallelujah" with Justin Timberlake and Matt Morris at the Hope for Haiti Now benefit concert and telethon for earthquake relief In 2010. Released as a single, the song marked Sexton's second appearance on the Billboard Hot 100 chart, where it reached No. 13.

Charlie and Will Sexton made a rare appearance as a duo opening for Roky Erickson and Okkervil River at Austin's Paramount Theatre on April 24, 2010. Sexton was also the guest performer for Conan O'Brien's Legally Prohibited from Being Funny on Television Tour stop in Austin on May 14, 2010. Sexton appeared with the band Spoon during their performance on the television show Austin City Limits. The episode premiered on PBS on October 9, 2010. Sexton performed on the song, "Who Makes Your Money".

Charlie and Will Sexton, Jakob Dylan, Brady Blade and Dave Matthews recorded an album at Blade's studio in Shreveport, Louisiana in early 2013. The group named themselves the Nauts. The album has not yet been released.

Sexton had a bit part in the Richard Linklater film Boyhood, released in 2014 to near-universal acclaim. (The Guardian ranked it at No. 3 on its 2019 list of the top 100 films of the 21st century.) In 2018, Sexton appeared in the documentary film Carmine Street Guitars and played Townes Van Zandt in the movie Blaze. Also in 2018 he produced the album Writing Wrongs for the Last Knife Fighter at Arlyn Studios in Austin, Texas. He has also played on guitar on the last two Jack Ingram records.

Sexton appeared with Chuck Prophet during a 2019 tour of Spain, covering the Rolling Stones' Some Girls album in its entirety, as well as additional songs by the Stones.

Sexton joined Elvis Costello & the Imposters on their Hello Again 2021 U.S. tour, and continued the association on the band's Boy Named If, and Other Favorites 2022 tour as well.

Sexton appeared on the 75th birthday celebration for David Bowie, produced by former Bowie keyboard player Mike Garson, on January 8, 2022.

In January 2022, the Arc Angels reunited to play four shows in Texas, with Eric Holden replacing Tommy Shannon on bass.

In April 2023, Sexton played at Willie Nelson's 90th birthday celebration at the Hollywood Bowl, playing "Remember Me" with Edie Brickell.

== Discography ==
Studio albums

- Pictures for Pleasure (1985)
- Charlie Sexton (1989)
- Under the Wishing Tree (1995)
- Cruel and Gentle Things (2005)
- The South Side Sessions (with Shannon McNally) (2006)
