= Gibson Melody Maker =

Electric guitar

Original Gibson Melody Maker
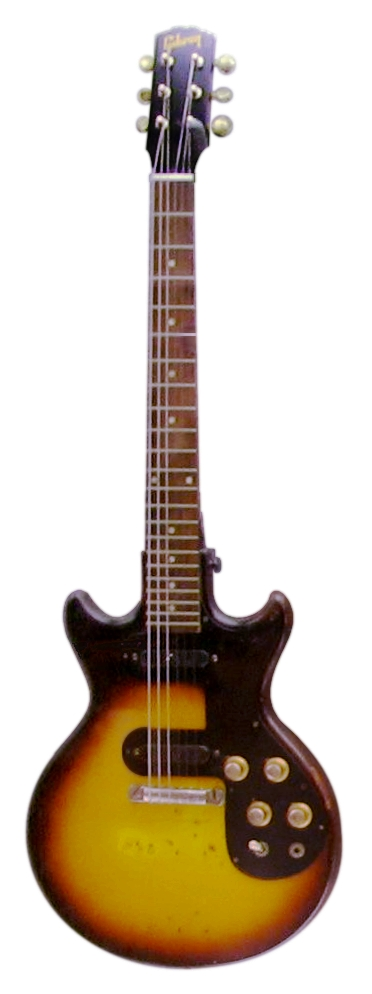
- Gibson Melody Maker (1960 or 1961)
- Manufacturer: Gibson
- Period: 1959–71, 1999–present

Construction
- Body type: Solid
- Neck joint: Set
- Scale: 24.75" (available with 18.56" short scale until 1970)

Woods
- Body: Mahogany
- Neck: Mahogany
- Fretboard: Rosewood

Hardware
- Bridge: wraparound tailpiece
- Pickup: 1 or 2 single coils

Colors available
- Sunburst, Fire Engine Red, Pelham Blue, Sparkling Burgundy, Walnut

The Gibson Melody Maker is an electric guitar made by Gibson Guitar Corporation. It has had many body shape variations since its conception in 1959.

== Model history ==
=== Regular issue (1959–71) ===
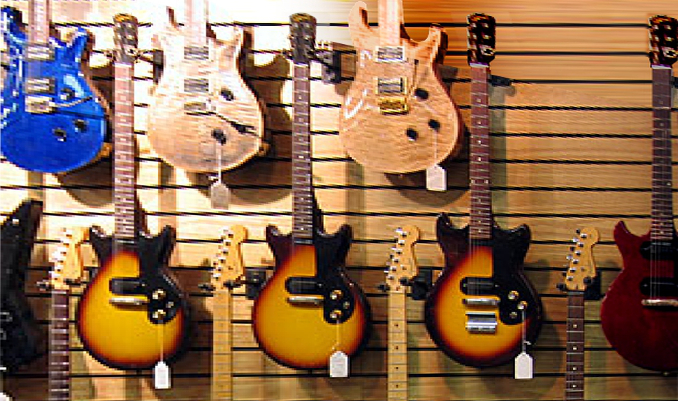
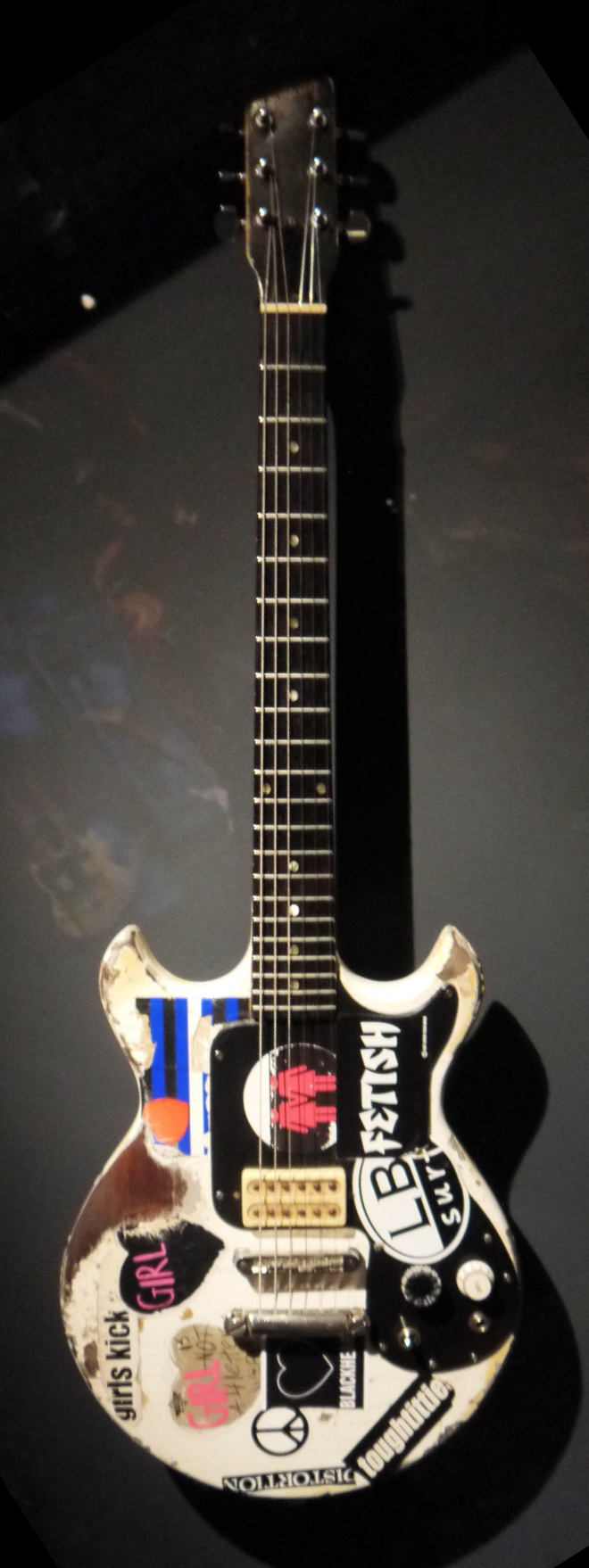
Variations of Double Cut Melody Maker:
1. 1961-1965 Double Cutaway ×2 (rounded horns)
2. 1965 Epiphone Olympic Special (asymmetrical small body, stopbar bridge with short vibrola)
3. 1977-1983 Melody Maker Double (pointed horns small body, double pickup, stopbar bridge), and
  Joan Jett's guitar (Tune-o-Matic bridge with stopbar tailpiece).

The original Gibson Melody Maker was first launched in 1959 and discontinued in 1971. Its purpose was as an even cheaper alternative to the Gibson Les Paul Junior which was itself introduced as a student model in 1954. From its inception it had a thin slab-style mahogany body and a glued in one-piece mahogany set neck. All the electronics, from the small "Fender style" single-coil pickups to the cable jack, were assembled on the pickguard and installed in a rout in the front of the body. The strings ran from a straight-sided simplification of the traditional Gibson headstock at one end to a wraparound bridge/tailpiece unit at the other.

From 1959 until 1961, the Melody Maker had a single cutaway slab body style similar to the early Les Paul Junior model but thinner. In 1961 the body style changed to a symmetrical double cutaway; the single cutaway model was discontinued. The body style was changed again in 1966 to that of the Gibson SG. Colloquially known as the SG Melody Maker, it gained the SG's pointed "horns", while a large white scratchplate and white pickup covers replaced the black.

The SG Melody Maker alongside the rest of the SG line was discontinued and replaced by the short-lived SG 100, 200 and 250 of 1972, quickly replaced by the more traditional SG I, II, and III. In 1974-75 Gibson finally moved to the much more cost-efficient bolt-on necks with the Gibson Marauder and then the Gibson Sonex of the 80s.

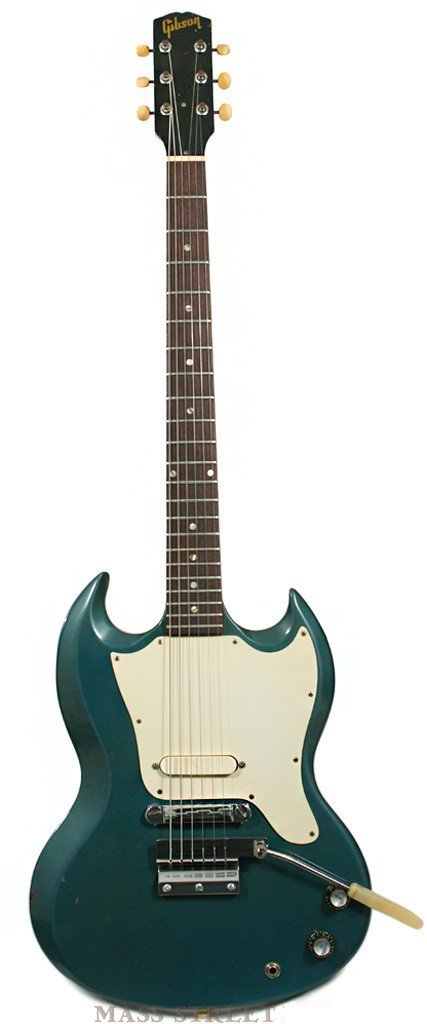
Gibson Melody Maker SG 1967 in Pelham Blue

Though Gibson stopped production of the Melody Maker in 1971, they continued manufacturing the classic single cut and double cut melody maker body style at various points throughout the years.

==== Epiphone Olympic ====
At the same time of the Melody Maker, Gibson's sister brand Epiphone made a version of the guitar named the Olympic. Initially virtually identical to the double cut Melody Makers, these guitars eventually developed an asymmetrical body with a slightly larger upper horn with the Olympic Special, and a higher-end model which shared a body with the later Epiphone Coronet, Wilshire, and Crestwoods called the Olympic Double.

=== Options ===
Options on the Melody Maker included two pickups on the Melody Maker "D" model and a short-scale 3/4 neck. In 1967 on the "SG Melody Maker" both two and three pickup versions and a twelve-string version were introduced, the Melody Maker II, III and XII respectively. A short length version of the Vibrola vibrato device was also available as an option.

From 1959 to 1964 the finish was a sunburst, from 1964 to 1965 it was cherry, from 1966 on the "SG" Melody Maker it was fire engine red or pelham blue, in 1967 red was replaced by sparkling burgundy and walnut became an option from 1968. Rare examples were made to order in other custom Gibson colors e.g. Inverness Green.

=== Revivals ===
==== 1970s and 1980s Melody Makers ====
The Melody Maker double-cutaway model was revived in 1977 until 1983. Some minor changes were introduced into the design including single coil pickups embossed with the Gibson logo, all metal tuning pegs and a latter-day Gibson stop tail piece and Tune-O-Matic bridge. These upgrades along with their still set-neck construction put these guitars slightly higher in price than their bolt-on neck replacements, but still very much affordable. These guitars came just in time for the birth of Punk and early Alternative artists, who embraced the simplicity and affordability of the "student instruments" new and vintage, the most notable being Joan Jett for whom the Melody Maker became her signature.

In 1986, Gibson issued a Melody Maker with a single-cutaway body. It had one humbucking pickup, Grover tuners, a Tune-O-Matic bridge, and a stop tailpiece. Two humbucking pickup models with two thumb switches were also made but are hard to find.

From 1987 to 1992 the Melody Maker Flyer/Pro 2 was a rare but suitably 80s model featuring an Explorer neck, Grover tuners, Kahler tremolo system and dual humbuckers. The body was standard single-cutaway Melody Maker and presumably leftovers of the 1986 run. The finish was black with a pearloid pick guard.

==== All American II ====
The Gibson All American II was manufactured between 1996-1998 as part of the company's "All American" line which also included The Hawk and The Paul II. It was inspired by the original Melody Maker, but differed from it in having chrome tuners, no scratchplate, controls rear-mounted in the traditional Gibson solid-body style, a 24 fret neck, and a Fender style bridge/vibrola unit.

The All American II featured two high output single coil pickups creating a tonality similar to a hotrodded Telecaster than a typical Gibson instrument.

==== Les Paul Melody Maker ====
Les Paul Melody Maker
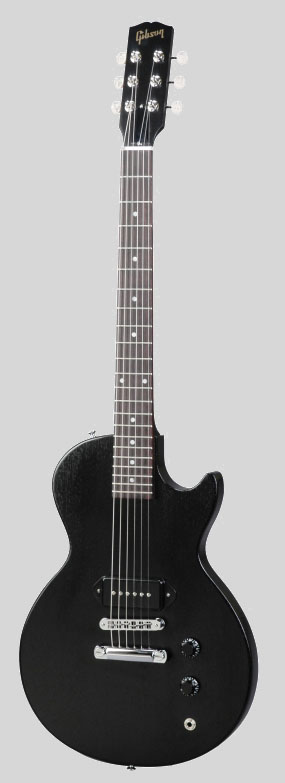
- Manufacturer: Gibson
- Period: 2003–06

Construction
- Body type: Solid
- Neck joint: Set
- Scale: 24.75"

Woods
- Body: Jacareuba
- Neck: Spanish cedar
- Fretboard: Rosewood

Hardware
- Bridge: Tune-o-matic
- Pickup: 1 P-90

Colors available
- Satin cherry, Ebony and Yellow

The Melody Maker was returned to the Gibson line as a sub-model of the Les Paul model. It offered a mixture of traditional Melody Maker features (straight-sided headstock, white button tuners, jack positioned on the top) and traditional Les Paul Junior features (bridge-mounted dogear P-90 pickup, Junior-style control mounting and pattern).

Like both the original Melody Maker and the original Junior, the Les Paul Melody Maker featured dot inlays as fretboard markers and did not have a cap on its top. Unlike either the original Melody Maker or the original Junior, both of which used wraparound bridge/tailpiece units, the Les Paul Melody Maker used a Tune-O-Matic bridge and separate stop tailpiece.

The Les Paul Melody Maker also differed from other Les Paul submodels in the width of the neck and the length of the heel.

==== 2007 Melody Maker ====
In 2007, the Melody Maker became a separate model. It now has a smaller single-coil pickup than the P-90, a wraparound bridge/tailpiece unit, a mahogany neck, and a pickguard similar to the original Melody Maker. The CEO of Gibson said in reference to the new Melody Maker that it could "almost be considered a reissue of a 1959 Gibson Melody Maker." The guitar is offered in satin finishes and is one of the most economical Gibson guitars in recent years. It was originally offered in single and dual pickup configurations. The dual pickup configuration was discontinued in 2008 and is now considered a collector's item on eBay

==== 2008 Joan Jett Signature Model ====
In 2008 Gibson released the Joan Jett Signature Melody Maker. It differs from the standard model by having a single burstbucker 3 humbucker pickup, an ebony fretboard and a double-cutaway body in white with a black vinyl pickguard. It also features a kill switch in place of a pickup selector. Jett has owned her Melody Maker since 1977 and has played it on all her hits. It retails for $839. There is now also a "Blackheart" version of this guitar introduced in 2010. All specs are the same, but it is finished in black, with red and pearl heart inlays.

==== 2011 Melody Maker ====
In 2011 Gibson released the Flying V Melody Maker, Explorer Melody Maker, SG Melody Maker and the Les Paul Melody Maker. All feature a single humbucker and 1 volume knob. Also in 2011, the Melody Maker Special, a two-pickup model with P-90 pickups, tone and volume controls, and pickup toggle switch mounted on a large vintage-style pick guard was produced.

==== 2014 Les Paul Melody Maker ====
In 2014, the Melody Maker name was reused for a new Les Paul variant. This single-cut variant uses the thinner body of the Les Paul Custom Lite, with a carved maple top, and a satin nitrocellulose finish. It also incorporates a maple neck with a 50's rounded profile, a full-size Les Paul headstock with a "Melody Maker" truss rod cover, and two P-90S pickups. These pickups, based on the original pickups of the Gibson ES-125, use Fender-style Alnico slug magnets as opposed to the usual bar magnets.

== Notable Melody Maker players ==
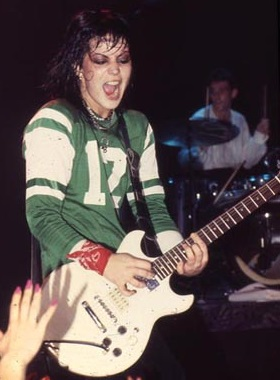
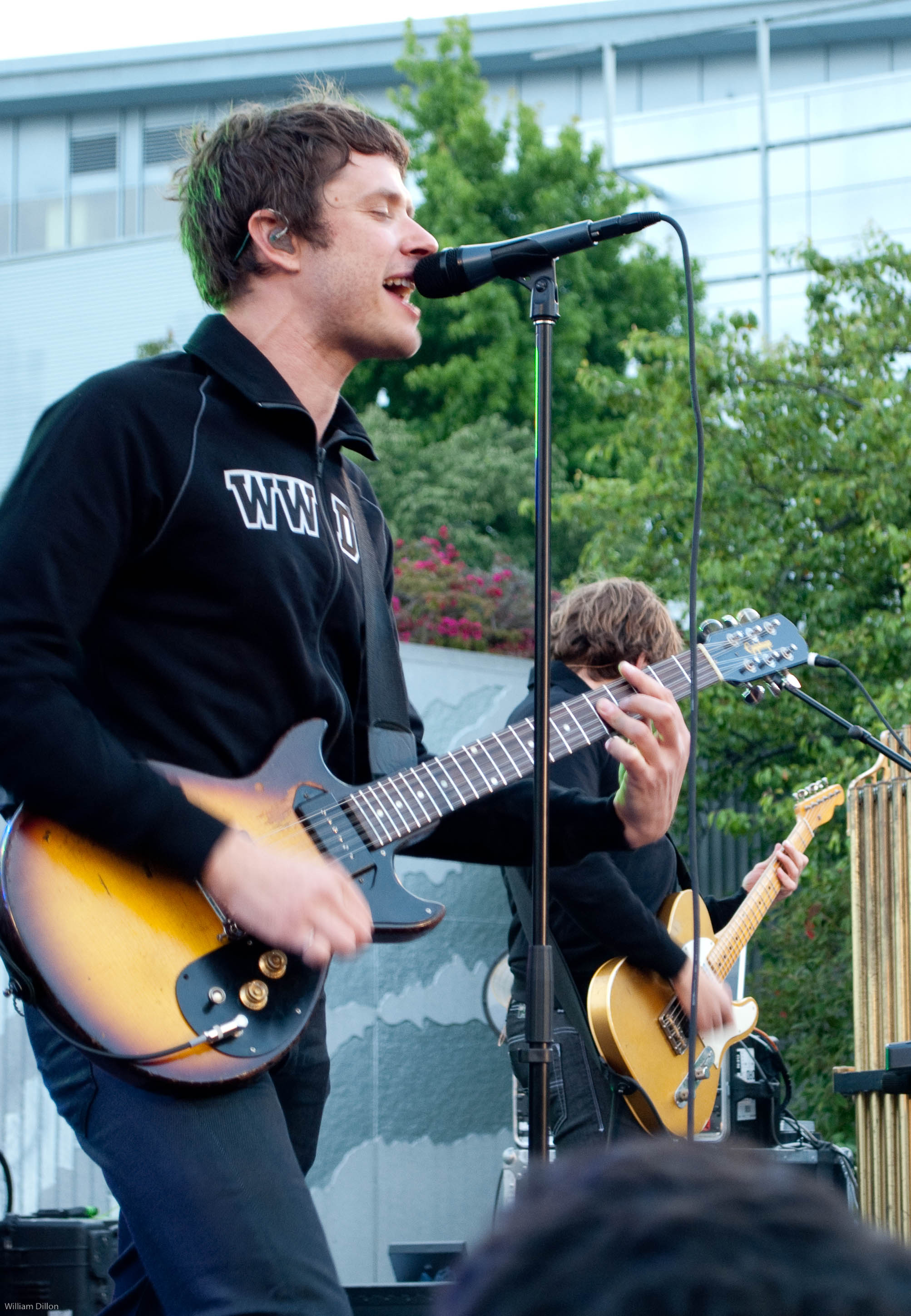
Some Melody Maker players, (left): Joan Jett playing later model (small body with pointed horns) in the 1980s; (right); Damian Kulash (OK GO) playing early model (symmetrical body) in 2010
- Ron Strykert
- Johnny Thunders
- Brian Bell
- Chris Ballew
- Carl Barât
- D. Boon
- Mick Box
- Eric Carmen
- Cheetah Chrome
- Michael Clifford
- John Dieterich (Deerhoof)
- John Farrar
- Suzi Gardner
- Billy Gibbons (first guitar)
- Nina Gordon
- David Ryan Harris
- Joan Jett
- Mick Jones
- John Watts
- Tim Kasher
- Terry Kath
- Mark Kozelek
- Norbert Krief
- Robby Krieger (used on first two Doors albums)
- Damian Kulash
- Toby Lee
- Steve Marriott
- Hank Marvin
- Jamie Miller
- Matt Mondanile
- Gary Moore
- Louise Post
- Carlos Santana (first guitar)
- Andy Scott
- Slash
- Donita Sparks
- Bill Steer
- Pat Travers
- Jane Wiedlin
- George Kooymans
- Andrew Osenga (modified for soapbar P90s)
- Brian "Damage" Forsythe
