= OXES =

American instrumental rock band

- Origin: Baltimore, Maryland
- Genres: instrumental rock
- Years active: 1999–present
- Label: Friends Records
- Members: Marc Miller; Natalio Fowler; Christopher Freeland

OXES is an American instrumental rock band from Baltimore. 'OXES' is a part of what is known as "The Baltimore Rowdy Collective" which stages practical jokes, usually involving a confrontational and outlandish racket in public places.

== Biography ==
=== Live shows ===
The band performed at the ATP Nightmare Before Christmas festival in Minehead, England in December 2011.

=== The OXES/Arab on Radar split 10-inch ===
Prior to the release of their eight-track album OXXXES in 2002, the band put out a 10-inch record, billed as a split EP between OXES and Rhode Island noise-rockers Arab on Radar. The A-side of the record was performed by OXES. However, the B-side was also OXES—this time convincingly impersonating Arab on Radar.

== Members ==
- Marc Miller – guitar
- Natalio Fowler – guitar
- Christopher Freeland – drums

== Discography ==
- (1999) Panda Strong 7-inch (Reptilian Records)
- (1999) split EP with "Big'n" (Box Factory Records)
- (2000) OXES (Monitor Records)
- (2000) split 10-inch with Arab on Radar (Wantage Records)
- (2002) 7-inch single "Half Half And Half" b/w "Everlong" (Monitor Records)
- (2002) OXXXES LP (Monitor Records)
- (2005) OXES EP (Monitor Records)
- (2011) "Bile Stbudy" 12-inch EP (Friends Records)
- (2011) "Orange Jewelryist" 12-inch EP (Africantape)
- (2011) "Crunchy Zest" 12-inch EP (Africantape)
- (2012) split 7-inch single with "Microkingdom" (Friends Records)

== See also ==
- Cass McCombs
- Battles
