= Sacred Baboon =

Studio album by Yezda Urfa
- Released: 1989
- Recorded: 1976 at Universal Studios, Chicago and Hedden West Recorders, Schaumburg, Illinois
- Genre: Progressive rock
- Length: 42:08
- Label: Syn-Phonic

Yezda Urfa chronology
Boris (1975)	Sacred Baboon (1989)

Sacred Baboon is the second, and only officially released, album by the American progressive rock group Yezda Urfa. The album was recorded in 1976, but not released until 1989.

In 1975 Yezda Urfa made a demo EP, Boris, but since no interest was generated by it, they decided to go for a second album that would be released on their own label with the hope that after it generated enough interest, it would attract the attention of a record company.

Yezda Urfa funded the project themselves, and just before finishing, they almost had a deal with a small label in Chicago, but the deal fell through. After completing the recording, but short of cash, they abandoned the idea of releasing the album and shelved the master tape.

Some time later, the band was discovered by Syn-Phonic and the album was released in 1989.

This album was recorded in about two weeks, in two different studios. They had started using the same studio as for the Boris album, but switched to another, more modern studio shortly after they started recording. In the time that had elapsed since recording Boris, their music had evolved. Some of the material that appeared on Boris was reworked for this album.

== Track listing ==
=== Side 1 ===
1. "Give 'em Some Rawhide Chewies" – 3:50
2. "Cancer of the Band" – 6:48
3. "Tota in the Moya" – 10:14

=== Side 2 ===
1. "Boris and his Three Verses" – 2:50
2. "Flow Guides Aren't My Bag" – 4:45
3. "(My Doc Told Me I Had) Doggie Head" – 5:02
4. "3, Almost 4, 6 Yea" – 8:39

Produced & recorded at Universal Studios, Chicago and Hedden West Recorders, Schaumburg, Illinois.

== Personnel ==
- Rick Rodenbaugh – vocals
- Phil Kimbrough – keyboards, Hammond B-3 organ, synthesizers (Moog Model 15, Memorymoog, Minimoog, Elka string machine), Wurlitzer & Fender Rhodes electric pianos, Yamaha grand piano, celesta, harpsichord, accordion, Gibson H-1 mandolin, flute, soprano & tenor recorders, backing vocals
- Mark Tippins – acoustic & electric guitars, backing vocals
- Marc Miller – Rickenbacker & Gibson Ripper basses, cello, marimba, vibraphone, backing vocals
- Brad Christoff – Ludwig drums, timpani, tubular bells, metallophone, glockenspiel, gong, agogô, percussion
