= Gibson Marauder =

Electric guitar model

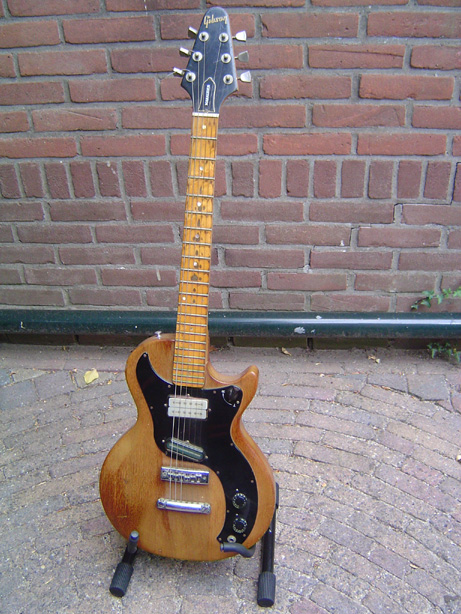
- Manufacturer: Gibson
- Period: 1974–1979

Construction
- Body type: Solid
- Neck joint: Bolt-on neck
- Scale: 24.75 in (629 mm)

Woods
- Body: Alder, Mahogany, Maple
- Neck: Maple
- Fretboard: Maple, Rosewood, Ebony

Hardware
- Bridge: Tune-o-matic, and "Short Lyre Vibrola" used on some models
- Pickup(s): H-SC: Bill Lawrence Humbucker (neck), Bill Lawrence Blade Noiseless Single-coil (bridge)

Colors available
- Classic White, Cherry, Ebony, Natural

The Gibson Marauder was an electric guitar model produced by Gibson between 1975 and 1979. Designed to compete with guitars made by Fender, it had limited success and was discontinued after only 7,111 had been sold.

== History ==
The Marauder was introduced as an attempt to break into the single coil pickup bolt-on neck guitar market, which was dominated by Fender at that time. To design the pickups, Gibson tapped Bill Lawrence, who had joined in 1972 and had already produced the L6-S. His design was reminiscent of the Fender Telecaster, contrasting the neck humbucker pickup with an angled single coil pickup in the bridge position, though the latter is often called a humbucker in popular reviews.

The Marauder was officially introduced in 1974 and began shipping in 1975, supported by endorsements from Ace Frehley and Paul Stanley. Minor modifications were made in 1976 and in 1978. The model was cancelled in 1979 though some were still made until 1982. In all, only 7,111 were ever made.

== Description ==
The Marauder sports a contoured single cutaway Les Paul-shaped body, and a bolt- on maple neck with a headstock similar to the Flying V's. Marauders were made with alder, maple, or mahogany bodies. The fretboard was produced both in the traditional Gibson rosewood, or a more Fender-like maple, both with 22 frets. Most had dot markers, "though some may have had trapezoid." In fact, rosewood fretboard could be bound and have typical to Gibson trapezoid markers. Such can be seen, for instance, in Gibson advertising materials of the time featuring Kiss Guitarist Paul Stanley.

Every Marauder featured custom-designed Bill Lawrence pickups sealed in clear epoxy. The guitar had a regular-sized humbucker pickup in the neck position and a blade-style single coil pickup, mounted at an angle, by the bridge (similar to a Telecaster or Stratocaster), often mistaken to be a special type of humbucker. This arrangement resembled the Fender Telecaster Custom and the resulting tone was closer to the Fender sound than that of most Gibson guitars, with more high frequencies than regular Gibsons.

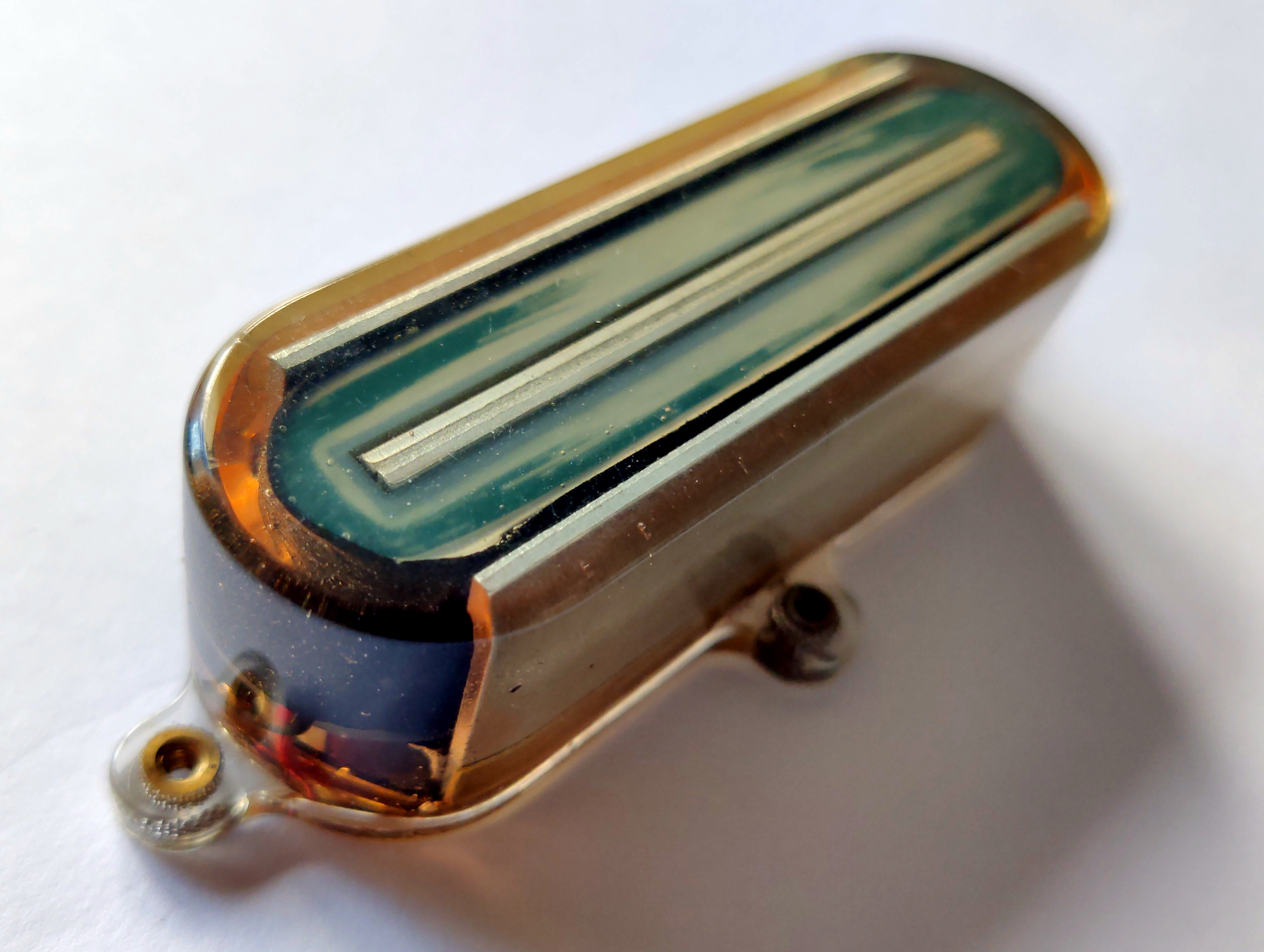
Gibson Marauder bridge pickup 1976

Early Marauders had a three-way toggle switch on the treble side of the upper bout of the body (opposite the location on Les Pauls and ES-175s, similar to a Gibson Byrdland), to select either one or both pickups. In 1976, a rotary potentiometer was introduced which allowed a range of blends between the two pickups. In still later Marauders, the potentiometer was positioned between the volume and tone knobs, now with a "chickenhead" knob to avoid confusion with the "speed" knobs used for the volume and tone.

All Marauders had a Schaller-made "Harmonica" tune-o-matic" style bridge and the standard Gibson "stopbar" tailpiece. They had enclosed "Gibson Deluxe" tuners and typical Gibson strap buttons.

Most common was the natural satin finish on 4,758 of the Marauders. 1,368 were finished in the colour wine-red, 460 were finished in Ebony, and 240 in tobacco sunburst. 202 Marauders without specified finish were mentioned in Gibson's shipping lists, and 83 Marauder Customs were made only in the tobacco sunburst finish. A handful more were built until 1982.

== Notable players ==
Sum 41 lead vocalist and guitarist Deryck Whibley's first guitar was a walnut Marauder and he famously can be seen playing it in the music videos for "Fat Lip" and "In Too Deep".

Asian Kung-Fu Generation vocalist and guitarist Masafumi Gotoh can be seen using a Marauder in the music videos for " Rewrite " and " After Dark ".

Adam Jones from Tool used it on their 2019 album Fear Inoculum.

Also used for many years by Angelo Flies of Massive Attack. David Keegan from The Shop Assistants is pictured holding his Marauder on the cover of their LP "Will Anything Happen" in the bottom right corner. Tom Coyle used a wine red model during his tenure in the HS band "Infinity" in 1981. Golden Earring guitarist George Kooymans used a Gibson Marauder for Drop-D songs like "Long Blonde Animal" live. This guitar was most likely bought in 1975 and first used on the To The Hilt album as it is seen in the promo video for the title track.

Notable users: Walter Schreifels of Rival Schools, George Johnson of The Brothers Johnson, Lee Ranaldo and Thurston Moore of Sonic Youth, Fox Amato of Horace Green, Mac McCaughan of Superchunk, Pete Shelley of Buzzcocks, Ricardo Mastria of Dead Fish, Josh Homme of Queens of the Stone Age, Mick Taylor and Hugo Ali of Shitsunami. Paul Stanley of Kiss claimed to have never actually played the Marauder but would bring one out for every encore and then smash the guitar in several pieces then throw them into the audience.

Quarterflash guitarist Jack Charles is seen playing a Gibson Marauder in a Harden my Heart video

== See also ==
- Gibson S-1
- Gibson Sonex
- Gibson Guitar Corporation product list
