= Gibson G3 =

1975 bass guitar

Gibson G-3
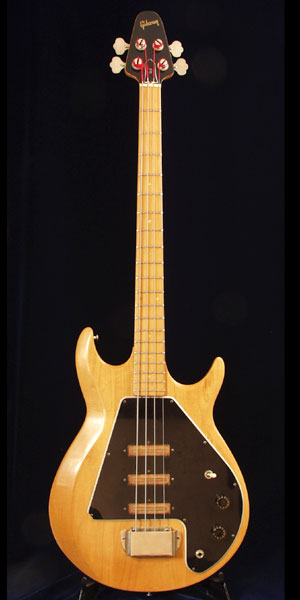
- 1976 Natural Finish Gibson G-3
- Manufacturer: Gibson
- Period: 1975–1985

Construction
- Body type: Solid
- Neck joint: Bolt-On
- Scale: 34½"

Woods
- Body: Maple/Alder
- Neck: Maple
- Fretboard: Maple/Ebony/Rosewood

Hardware
- Bridge: Fixed
- Pickup: 3 Wired in "Buck-and-a-half" Configuration

Colors available
- Maple Gloss, Natural Satin, Black, Tobacco Sunburst, Wine Red, Walnut

The Gibson G-3 was a bass guitar by Gibson building on the design of the Gibson Grabber.

Introduced in 1975 as a companion to the Gibson Grabber, the G-3 (which stands for Grabber 3) introduced a new pickup scheme to the already established body style. Instead of a sliding pickup as was present in the Grabber, the G-3 featured a so-called "buck-and-a-half" trio of single coils. Along with a tone and volume control, the G-3 featured a three-way switch linked in with three Bill Lawrence single coil pickups. The pickups were designed for a "bright/low" tonality and all three pickups were designed with different tonalities. In the up position, the neck and middle pickups would be activated, and, as they were wired out of phase, a humbucker effect would result. Likewise, in the down position, the middle and bridge pickups would be activated similarly. However, when switched to the middle position, all three pickups would be activated, the neck and bridge pickups being in phase while the middle would be out of phase with both, hence the term "buck-and-a-half".

== Notable players ==
- Brian Cook - Botch, These Arms Are Snakes, Russian Circles, Sumac
- Mike Dirnt - Green Day
- John Entwistle - The Who
- Kenny Vasoli - The Starting Line
- Jeremy Davis - Paramore
- Timi "Grabber" Hansen - Mercyful Fate
- Julian Dimagiba - Young Rising Sons
- Nik Bruzzese - Man Overboard
- Billy Hamilton - Silverstein
- Andy Patil - Matt Mays and El Torpedo, Bubbles and the Shitrockers
- Pierre Kezdy - Naked Raygun, Pegboy, Strike Under
- Kelly Groucutt - Electric Light Orchestra
- Krist Novoselic - Nirvana

== 2012 Inspired Reissue ==
In 2012, Gibson introduced a G-3 inspired model in their '70s Tribute Series. Coined the Grabber 3 '70s Tribute Bass, this instrument borrows heavily from the visual aesthetic of the original G-3 while also retaining the "buck-and-a-half" pickup combination, albeit with modern Alnico V single coil pickups as opposed to the Bill Lawrence models used in the original; as well as having a more traditional pickup layout, as opposed to the pickups in the original which hugged closer to the bridge.

== See also ==
- Gibson Grabber
- Gibson Ripper
- Gibson S-1
