= Hard-tail =

The term hard-tail has several meanings:

- A hardtail guitar bridge for an electric guitar or archtop guitar incorporates hardware that anchors the strings at or behind the bridge and is fastened securely to the top of the instrument. See stoptail. It differs from a floating tailpiece (similar to a violin), a tremolo arm or vibrato tailpiece, or string-through body anchoring.
- A hard-tail bicycle or motorcycle is one without rear suspension. See Bicycle suspension or Suspension (motorcycle).
