= Grabber =

Grabber may refer to:

- Frame grabber, an electronic device
- Gibson Grabber, a bass guitar
- Grabber arm, a handheld tool
- Grabbers, a monster film
- Jane the Grabber, an American underground figure
