= Gibson Ripper =

Model of electric bass guitar

Ripper L9-S
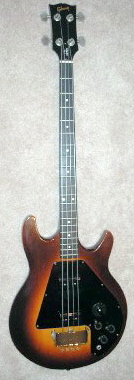
- Manufacturer: Gibson
- Period: 1973–1983, 2009

Construction
- Body type: Solid
- Neck joint: Set

Woods
- Body: Maple (1973–74, 1976–1983, 2009) or Alder (1975)
- Neck: Maple
- Fretboard: Ebony or Maple

Hardware
- Bridge: Fixed
- Pickup: 2 super-humbucking

Colors available
- Natural, ebony, sunburst, cherryburst

The Gibson L9-S Ripper is a model of electric bass guitar made by Gibson Guitar Corporation.

The Ripper was designed by Bill Lawrence, and manufactured from 1973 until 1983, the peak year being 1976. Most had a maple body with laminated maple neck; however a significant number manufactured in 1975 had lighter alder bodies while retaining the maple neck. Also in 1975, a sharper-edged and slimmer body, with more beveling and contours around the horns of the bass, was introduced. The later models of 1976 and on featured a different routing in the body for the wires, and the pickups were screwed in by three posts as opposed to the old two-post variation.

The Ripper was initially available in three colors: natural, black, and tobacco sunburst. Natural Rippers received a maple fingerboard, while black or sunburst basses received an ebony fingerboard. A handful of 1974 basses were finished in cherry sunburst, which was never listed as a standard finish option. These basses are extremely rare.

The headstocks were painted black and featured the "Gibson" logo in gold script. Most models feature a black pickguard, though closer inspection reveals that some pickguards only appear black and are actually a very dark tortoiseshell pattern. A few early basses were equipped with a bright red tortoiseshell pickguard.

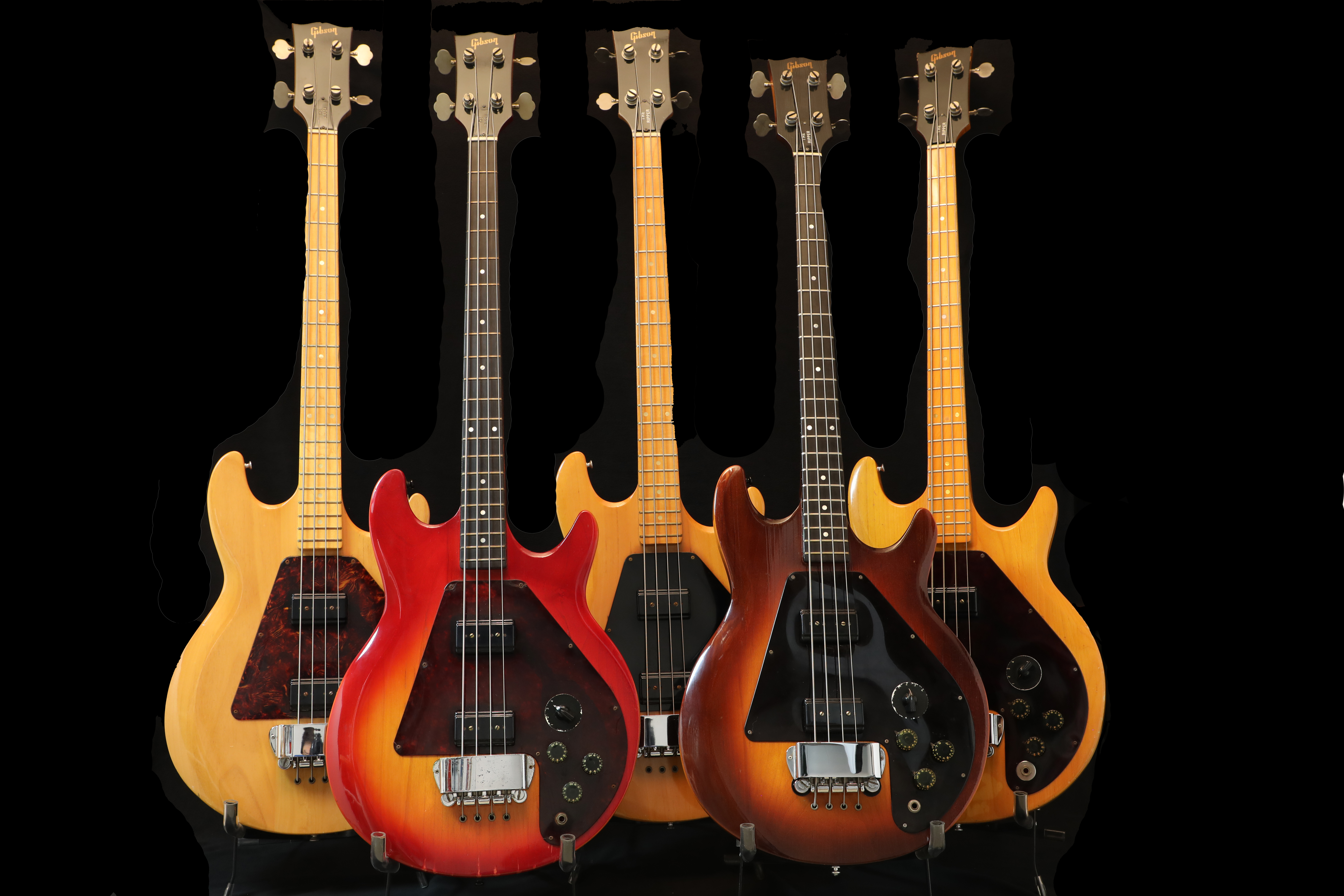
Several all-original Rippers from 1973 and 1974

The L9-S came equipped with two humbucking pickups designed especially for the Ripper by Bill Lawrence which were called "Super Humbuckers." The "Q System" tone circuit included a master volume, master tone, a midrange roll-off, and a four position pickup selector control:

Q-System Knob Settings
Knob Position	Pickup Wiring	Tone Description
1	Both pickups, in-phase, wired in series	Brighter, full
2	Bridge pickup only	Max treble
3	Both pickups, in-phase, wired in parallel	Deeper, full
4	Both pickups, out-of-phase, wired in series	Sharper, edgy

The original circuit had no provision for the neck pickup being soloed. Some owners had their basses modified to replace position 4 with that option, finding the out-of-phase, series wiring to be too brittle and biting.

There was also a fretless version of the Ripper – identical in all respects (fretboard aside).

The original Gibson model is now rare and has seen significant inflation in value over time. Epiphone offered a less expensive model that was produced for several years. Although it shared the same body style and aesthetic of the original, it was equipped with either a single humbucking pickup, or a P/J set instead of the original's Super Humbuckers. The circuits were simplified as well, and necks were typically bolt-on and not set.

Gibson re-introduced the Ripper in 2009 as the "Ripper II", with slightly different specs from the initial 1973–1983 run. The reissue featured a Corian nut, unlike the original which was a plastic material, and it featured a top-load tailpiece with no string-through-body option. The Super Humbuckers were wired differently, as they were reissues manufactured by Seymour Duncan for Gibson. The 2009 Rippers feature a master volume knob, a mid-range notch filter (capacitor/inductor), a master tone knob, and a six-position selector switch for choosing between different pickup configurations.

The Ripper is "cousin" to the Gibson Grabber and Gibson G3 models also manufactured by Gibson around the same time. All three had the same body shape, but different appointments. The Grabber had a different headstock and featured a sliding pickup that could be moved between the neck and bridge positions. The G3 featured three single-coil pickups that could be selected in a variety of tonal options. The "Grabber II" was also re-released in 2009. The Ripper used set-neck construction, while both the G3 and Grabber had bolt-on necks.

== Notable users ==
- Mike Dirnt – Green Day
- Dušan "Koja" Kojić – Disciplin A Kitschme
- Mel Schacher – Grand Funk Railroad
- Rick Danko – The Band
- Carol Kaye
- Wylie Gelber – Dawes
- Krist Novoselic – Nirvana
- Gene Simmons – Kiss
- Mark Mendoza – The Dictators and Twisted Sister
- Gerald Casale – Devo
- Tiran Porter – The Doobie Brothers
- Peter Cetera – Chicago
- Louis Johnson – The Brothers Johnson
- Suzi Quatro
- Jack Blades – Night Ranger
- Michael Shuman – Queens of the Stone Age
- Gordon Moakes – Young Legionnaire
- Greg Lake – Emerson, Lake and Palmer
- Matt Sharp – Weezer
- Mike Tilka – Max Webster
- Mikey Welsh – Weezer
- Mark Evans – AC/DC
- Chris Feinstein – Ryan Adams & the Cardinals
- Lou Barlow – Dinosaur Jr.
- Ted Mulry – Ted Mulry Gang
- Kyle Johnson – Misery Signals
- Marc Miller – Yezda Urfa
- Nate Mendel – Foo Fighters
- Joseph Pope III – Nathaniel Rateliff and the Nightsweats
- Tom Wolk – Hall & Oates, the Saturday Night Live band
- Bobby Markos – Cloakroom
- Tod Bowers – Davy Knowles
- Patrick Djivas – Premiata Forneria Marconi
- Ron "The Ripper" Greco - Crime (band)
- Ben Zito - The Crane Wives
