= Gibson S-1 =

Electric guitar model

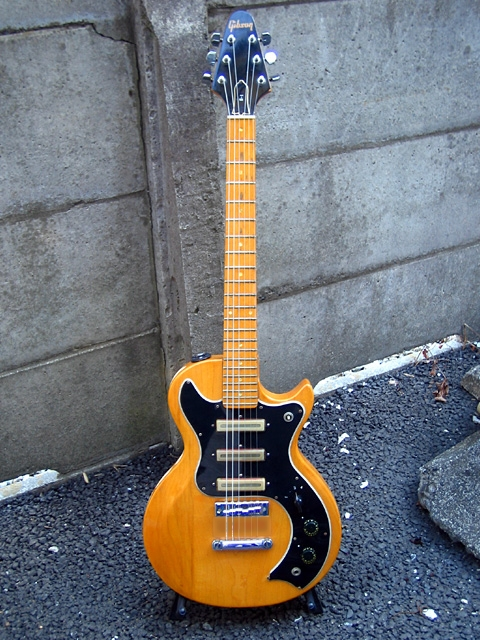
- Gibson S-1 in natural finish
- Manufacturer: Gibson
- Period: 1974–1980

Construction
- Body type: Solid body
- Neck joint: Bolt-on neck
- Scale: 24.75 in (629 mm)

Woods
- Body: Maple, Mahogany, or Alder
- Neck: Maple
- Fretboard: Maple or Rosewood

Hardware
- Bridge: Tune-o-matic with stopbar
- Pickup: 3 Bill Lawrence single coils

Colors available
- Natural, Ebony, Tobacco, Sunburst, Wine Red, Walnut

The Gibson S-1 is a solid-bodied electric guitar, made by the Gibson Guitar Corporation. Notable players include Carlos Santana, Ronnie Wood, Keith Richards, and Angel Olsen. Only 3,089 of them were sold before the model was discontinued in 1980.

== History ==
The S-1 was introduced as part of Gibson's attempt to break into the single-coil bolt-on neck guitar market, which was then dominated by Fender. It began production in mid-1974, and debuted in 1975 with endorsements from Carlos Santana as well as Rolling Stones guitarists Ronnie Wood and Keith Richards. However, the nontraditional construction and Fender-like characteristics led to disappointing sales, as they previously had with the similar Gibson Marauder. As a result, both the Marauder and the S-1 were discontinued in early 1980.

The S-1 enjoys an afterlife as a vintage guitar. Its main proponent as of 2020 is Angel Olsen, who gravitated towards the instrument for its ability to produce a variety of tone colors.

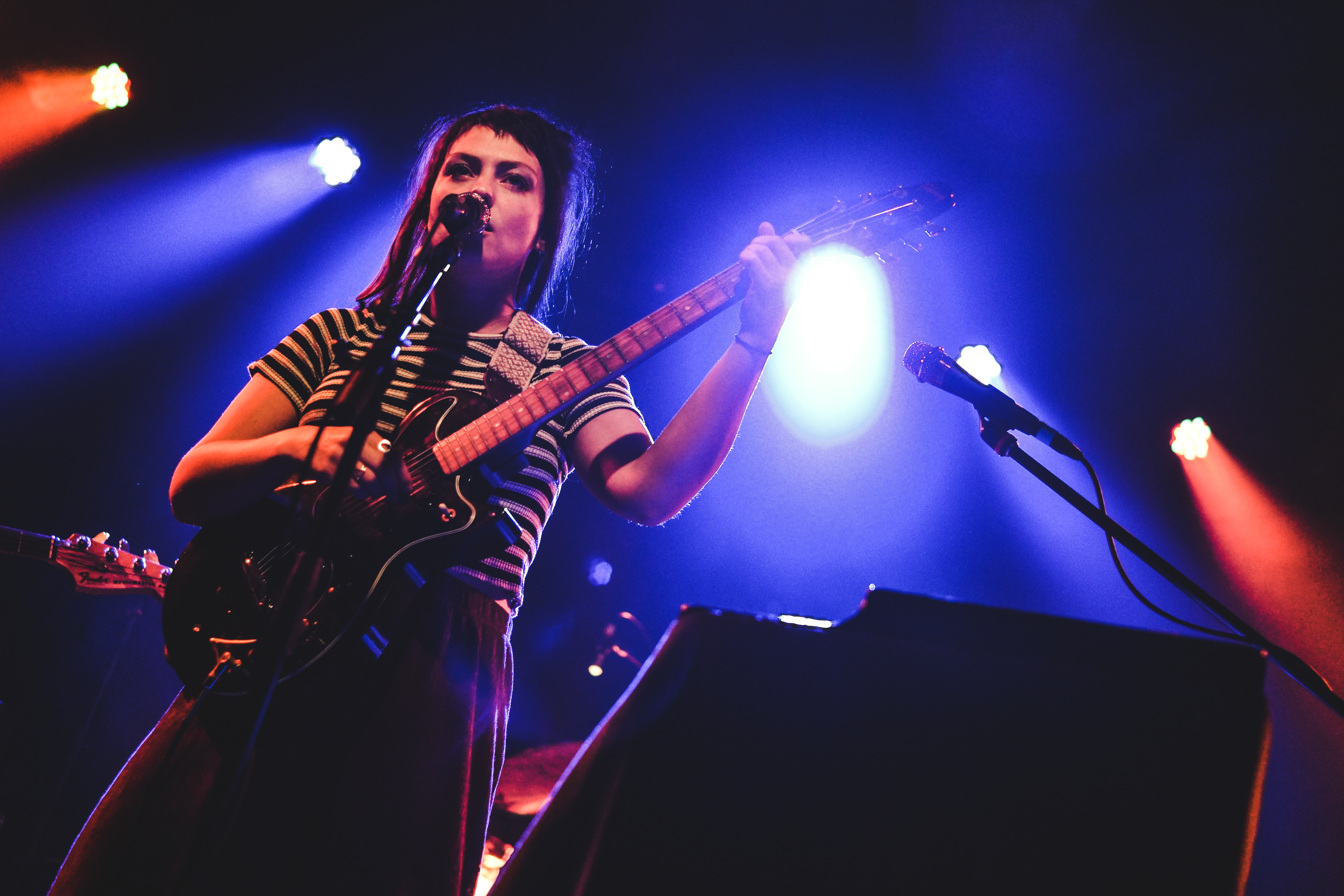
Angel Olsen playing her 1979 Gibson S-1

== Description ==
The body of the S-1 was broadly similar to the Marauder. It was made of a solid Les Paul Jr-like body with a maple Flying V neck bolted on. It was adorned with Schaller made "Harmonica" style tune-o-matic bridge and the standard Gibson stopbar tailpiece.

However, the S-1 was unique in its elaborate electronics and wiring. It featured three "see-thru" single-coil pickups designed by Bill Lawrence, which could be used together to generate humbucking sounds. The pickups were controlled by a combination of a toggle switch and a "chicken head" rotary switch. The rotary switch had four positions which allowed different selections of pickup combinations: 1) neck + middle, 2), middle + bridge 3) all three together, and 4) neck and bridge out of phase. The toggle switch bypassed the entire 4 position rotary switch circuit and made one straight connection to the bridge pick-up.

Because of its unusual pickups and unique wiring scheme, the instrument was capable of a wide range of distinctive sounds. When interviewed about her 1979 S-1 with Ebony finish, Angel Olsen commented that "it has all these tones to it. If I wanted to make it super bright, I could do that for certain songs… I just love my guitar"

== See also ==
- Gibson Marauder
- Gibson Sonex
- Gibson Guitar Corporation product list
- Bill Lawrence
