= Badass (guitar bridges) =

- Company type: Private
- Founder: Leo Quan
- Area served: Worldwide
- Products: bridges

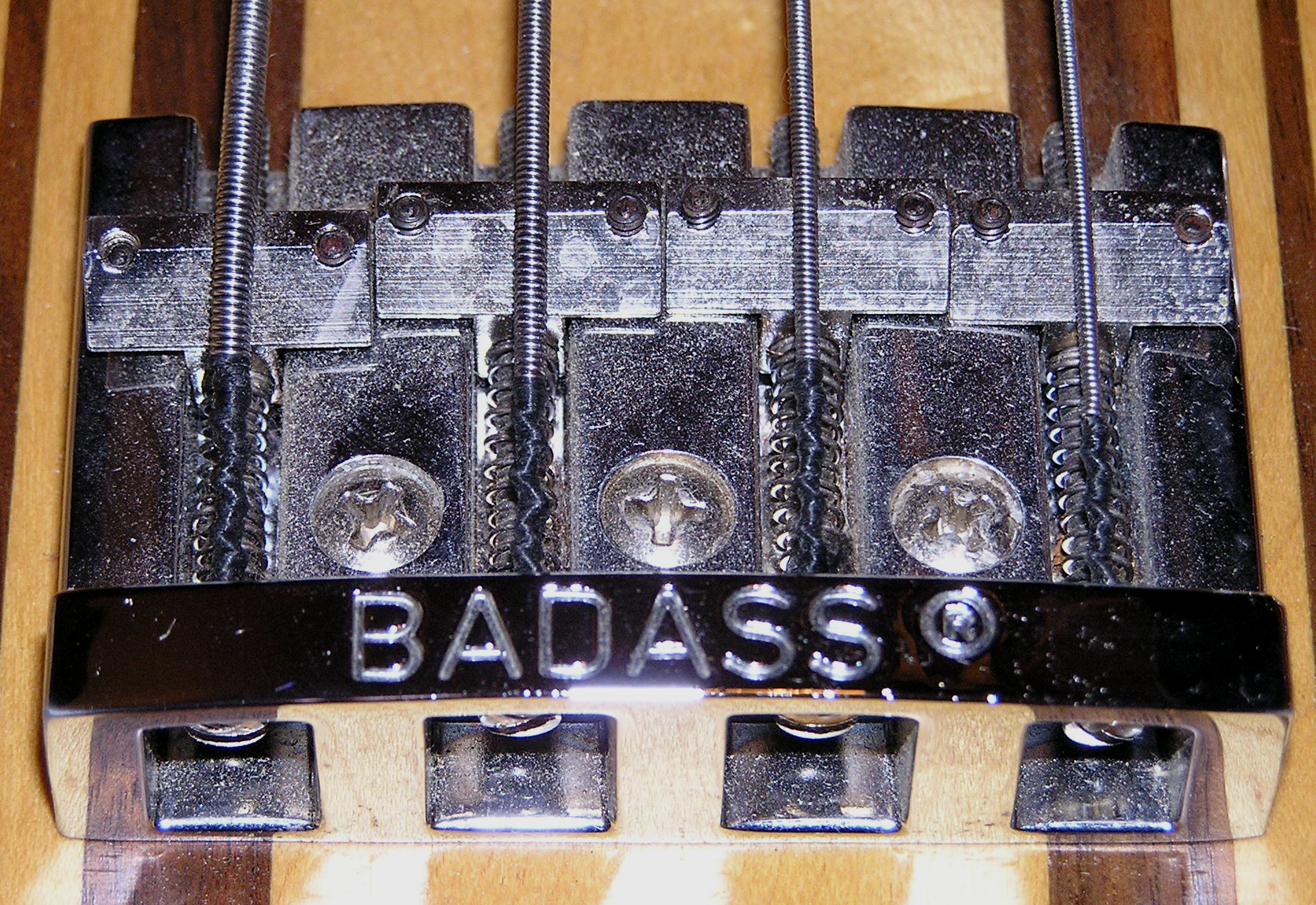
Badass Bridge on a C.F. Martin Co EB18

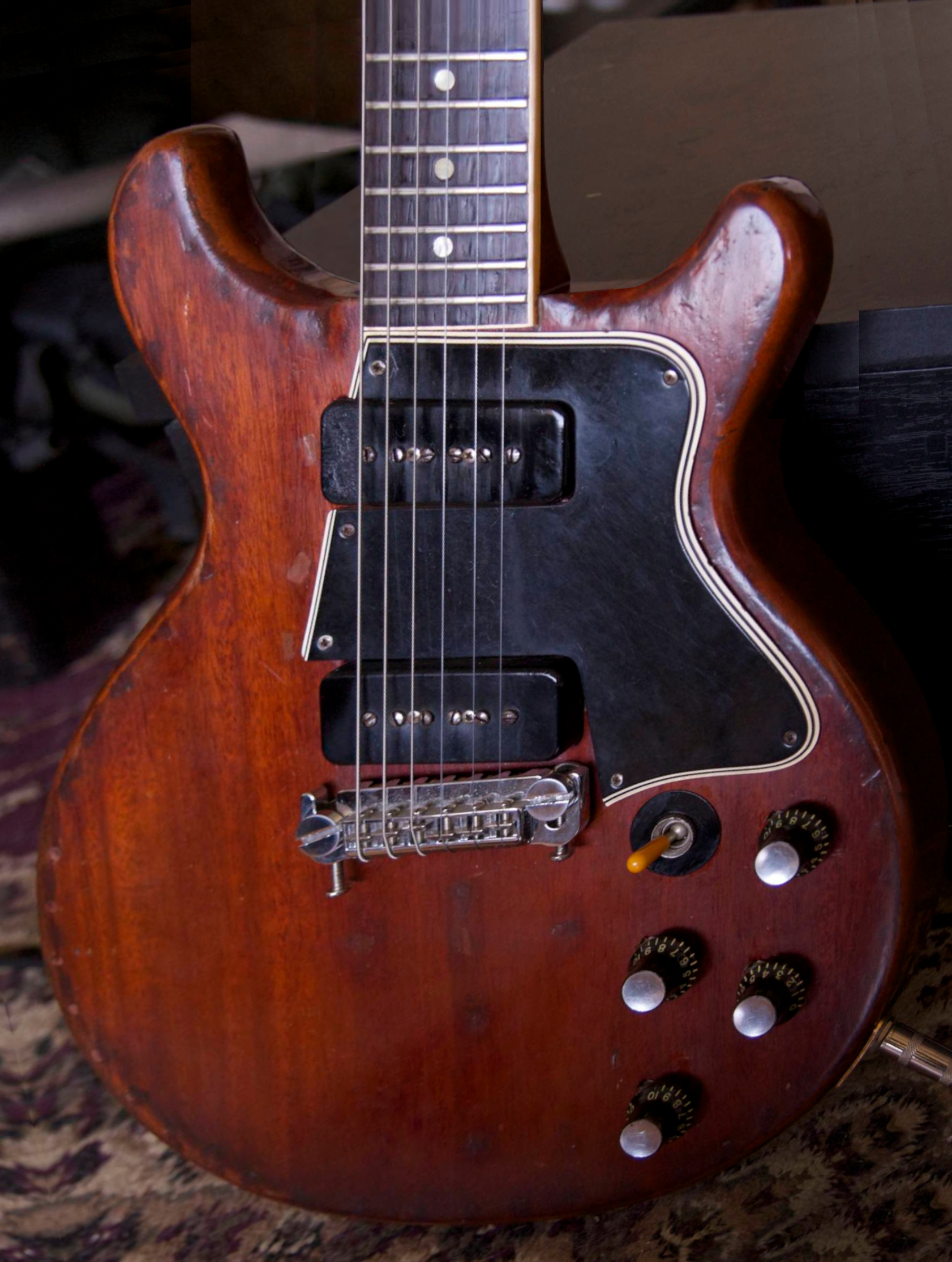
Badass Tailpiece Bridge as a replacement of wraparound stopbar on Gibson Les Paul Special / SG Special

Badass was first trademarked by Leo Quan, a manufacturer of bridges for guitars and basses. Badass bridges (used on the Martin EB18 electric bass and a replacement bridge on the Fender Precision Bass) feature individually adjustable saddles, which allows for "extremely accurate intonation adjustments." The Badass came on the market in the 1970s, and was made by entrepreneur and guitar repairman Glen Quan, of Marin County music store Bananas At Large and Leo Malliaris of Oakland's Leo's Music (hence Leo Quan). The first Badass bridges were built from diecast zinc and were considered somewhat rough; later models were made from a high-density zinc alloy and more finely milled. Badass is currently owned and distributed by Allparts Music, a subsidiary of Morse Group. In late 2022 and early 2023 Allparts Music relaunched the entire Badass bridge line including the Badass II bass bridge, Badass III bass bridge, Badass V bass bridge, Badass Wraparound Guitar Bridge, and Badass Fine Tuner Guitar Tailpiece.

== Notable users and models ==
- Frank Bello (Anthrax) on his Fender signature bass.
- Mike Dirnt (Green Day), Badass II on a Fender Precision Bass made in the Fender Custom Shop, the source of the signature Mike Dirnt Precision Bass.
- Steve Harris (Iron Maiden), Badass II bridge on his Fender Precision Bass.
- Kirk Hammett (Metallica, formerly Exodus), on his 1974 Gibson Flying V.
- Geddy Lee (Rush); the 1998 "Geddy Lee Limited Edition" Fender Jazz Bass is equipped with a Badass II, also his Jetglo Rickenbacker 4001 with a Badass I.
- Marcus Miller, on a Fender Jazz Bass.
- Jimmy Page (Led Zeppelin), on his Danelectro.
- Malcolm Young (AC/DC); the Gretsch "Malcolm Young Series" was equipped with a Badass bridge, based on Young's customized early 1960s Gretsch Jet Firebird.
- Jerry Only (Misfits); on his "devastator" bass.
- Juan Alderete (The Mars Volta, Racer X), on his Fender Precision Bass.
- David Ellefson (Megadeth); David's Jackson signature bass model has a Badass II bridge.
- Sting (The Police) on his Spector NS-2 bass.
- Nate Mendel (Foo Fighters) uses a Badass II on his signature Fender Precision Bass model.
- Dan Andriano (Alkaline Trio, The Damned Things) uses Badass II bridges on many of his Fender Precision and Jazz Basses.
- Flea (Red Hot Chili Peppers) used a Badass II on his Modulus Basses.
- C.J. Ramone on his Fender Dee Dee Ramone Precision Basses.
- Les Claypool (Primus) on his Carl Thompson's Maple Piccolo Bass.
- Ben Shepherd (Soundgarden) on his primary Fender Precision and Jazz Basses.
