= Stoptail bridge =

Guitar part

4-types of Hard-tail & 2-types of Vibratos on Les Paul

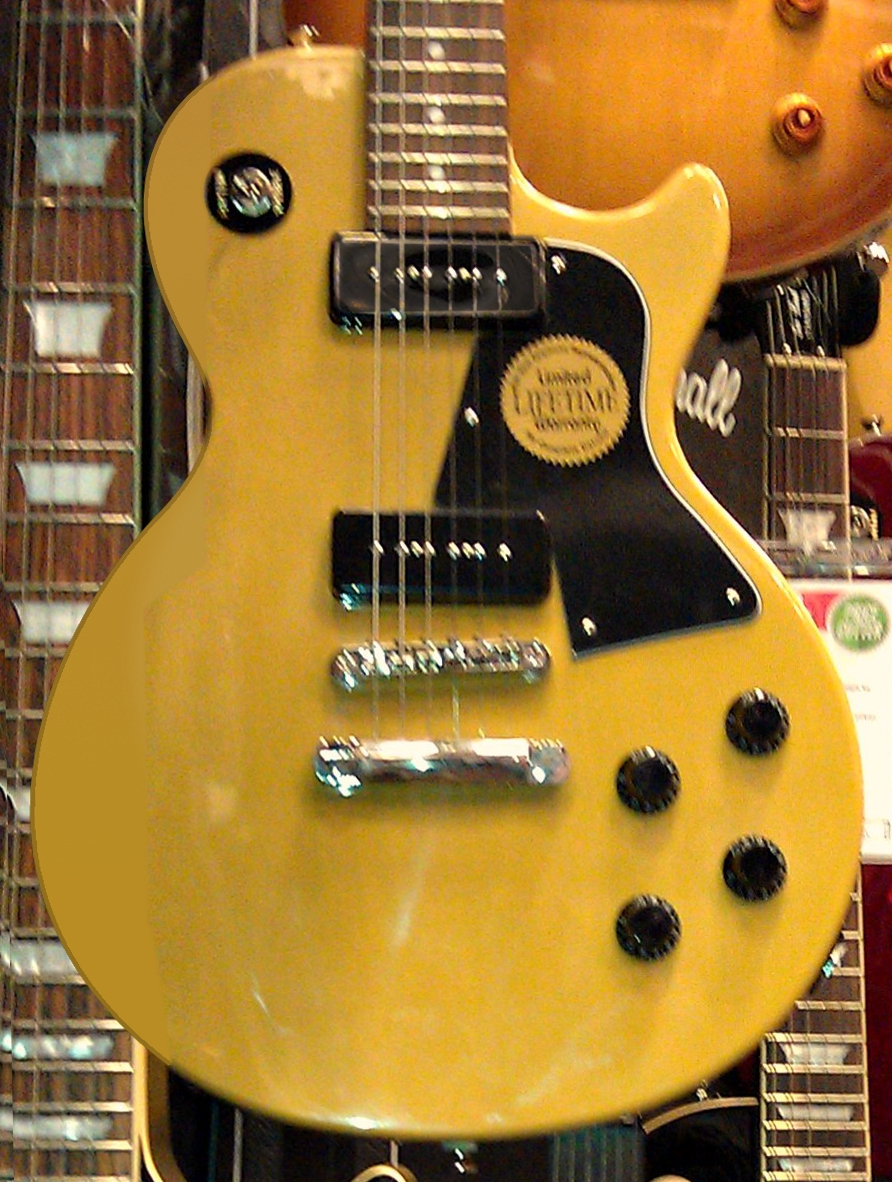
[hard-tail] Stopbar tailpiece with Tune-O-Matic bridge (born 1953)

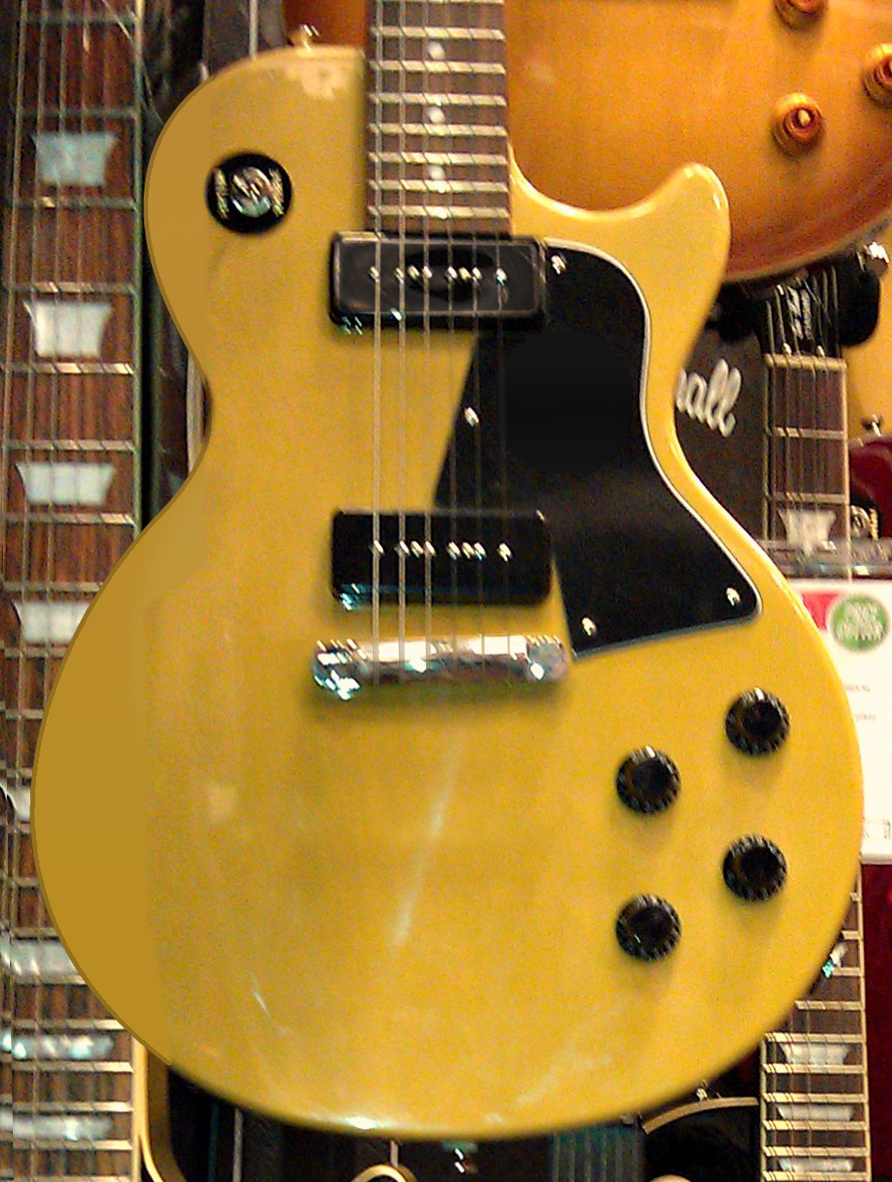
[hard-tail] Wraparound stopbar bridge /tailpiece (1953–)

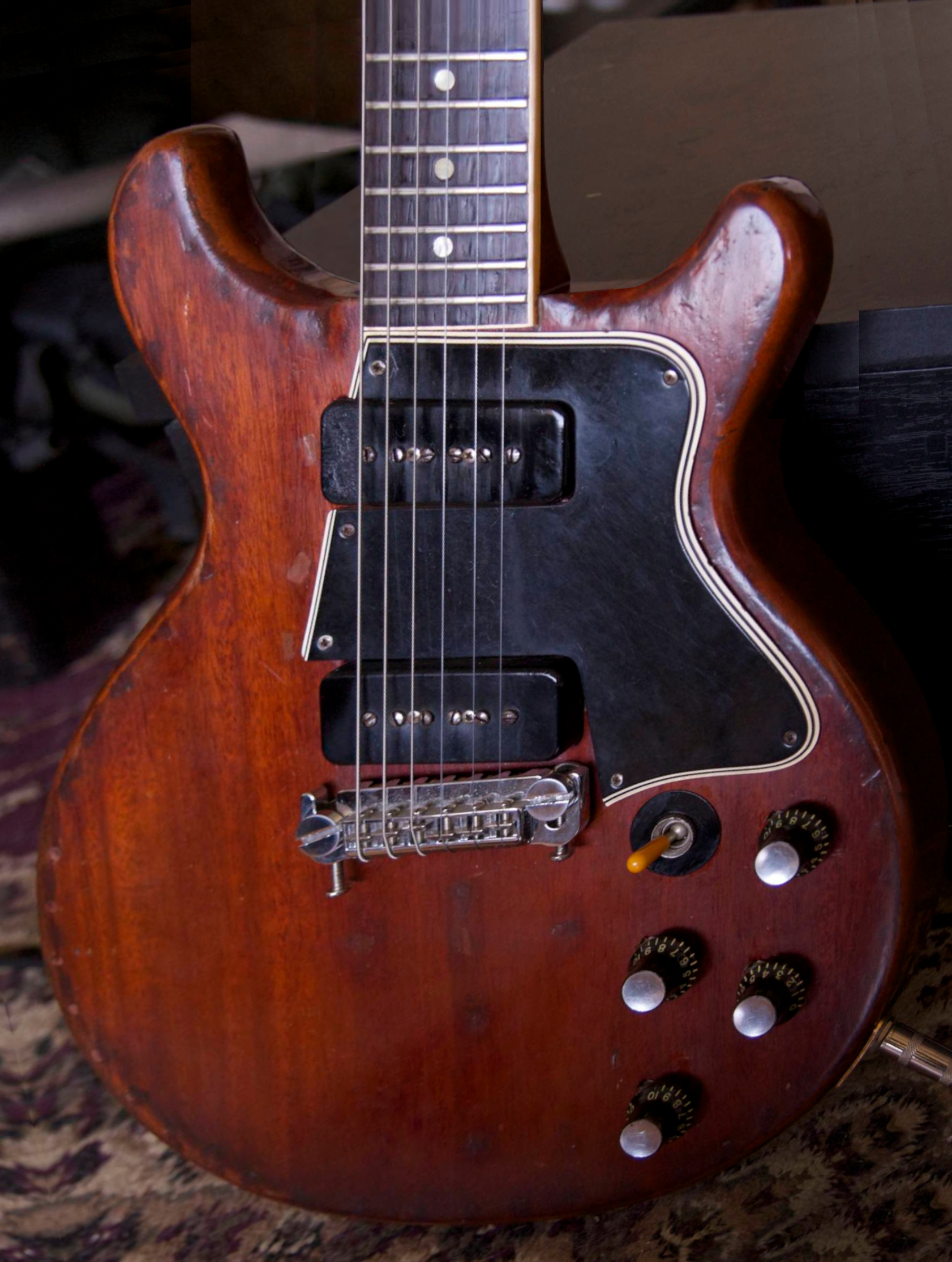
[hard-tail]
Wraparound type, Badass bridge /tailpiece

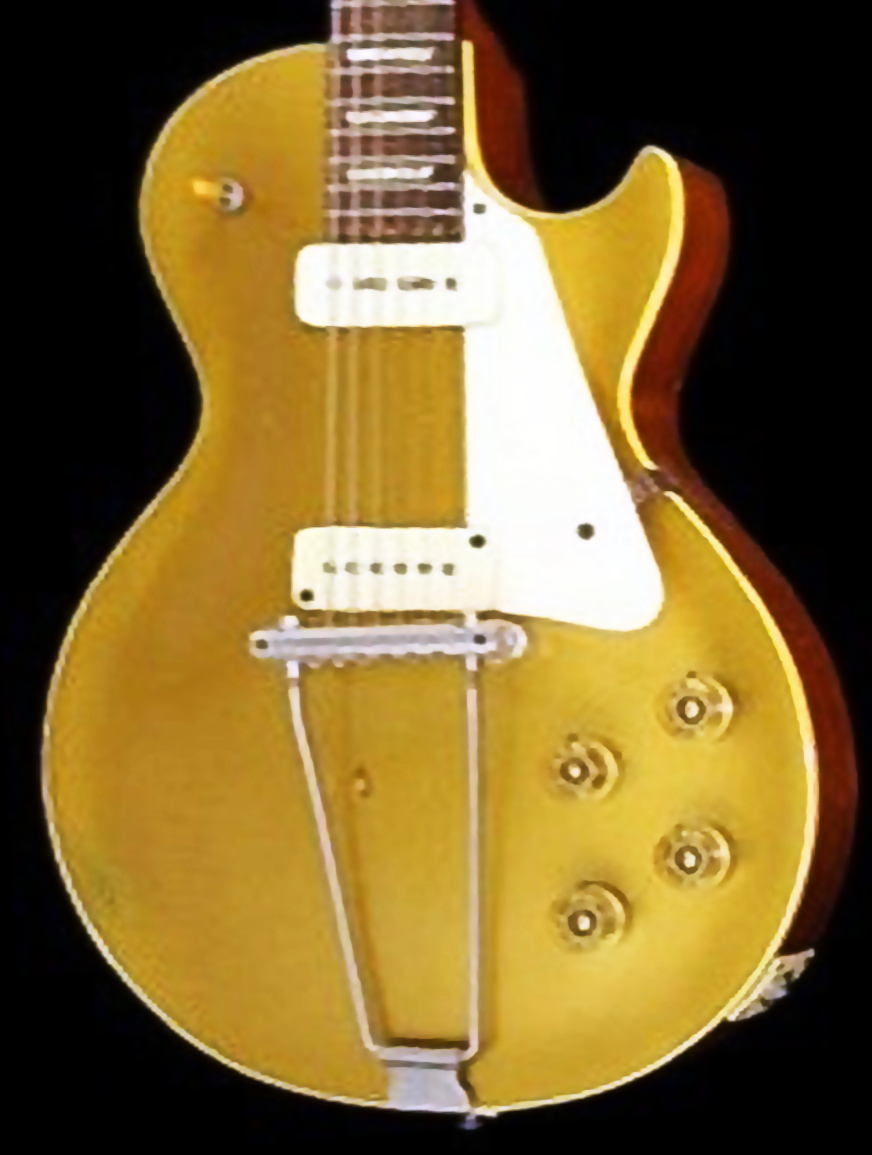
[hard-tail]
Wraparound type, Trapeze bridge /tailpiece (1952-53)

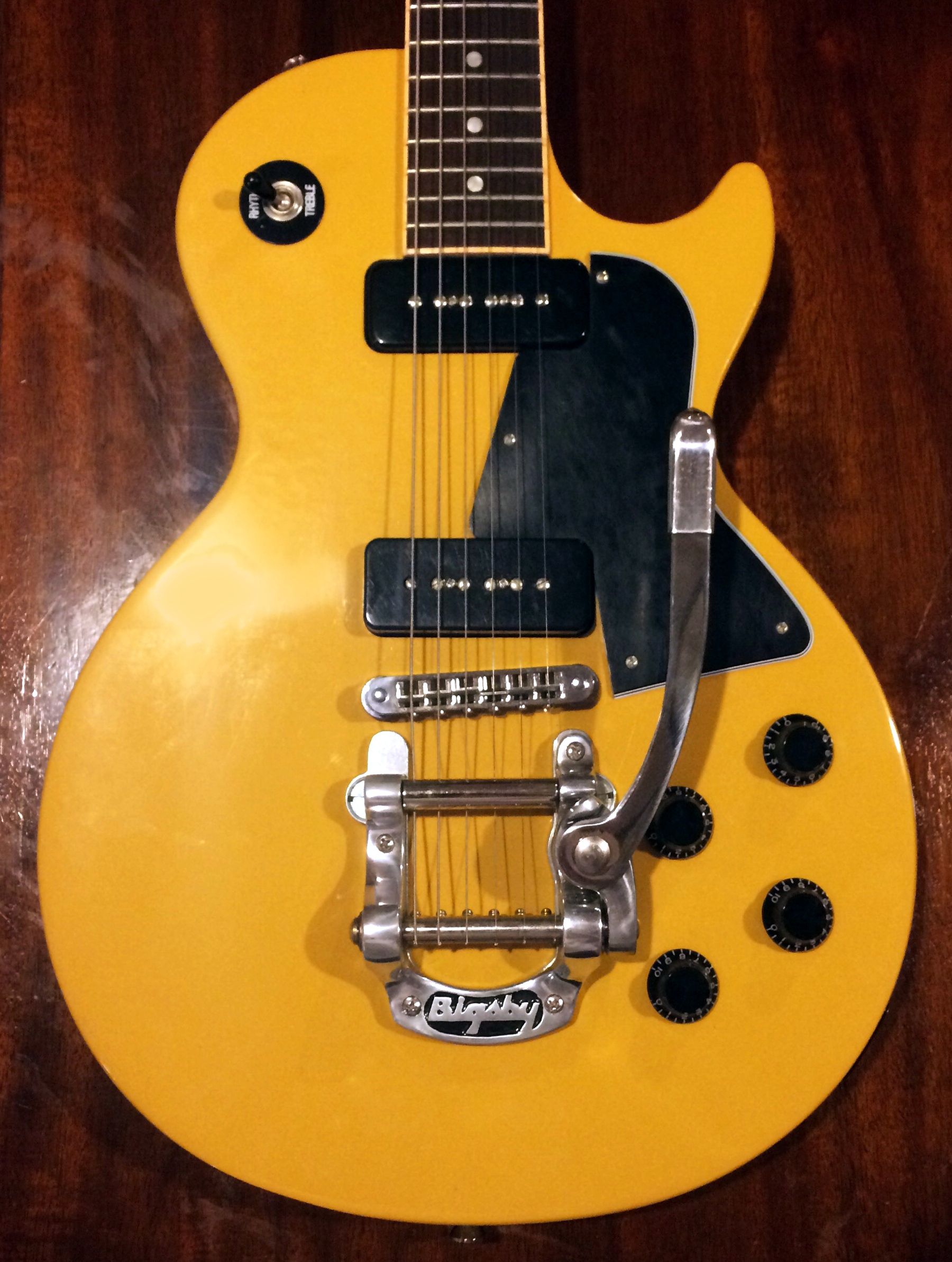
[vibrato tailpiece] Bigsby with Tune-O-Matic bridge

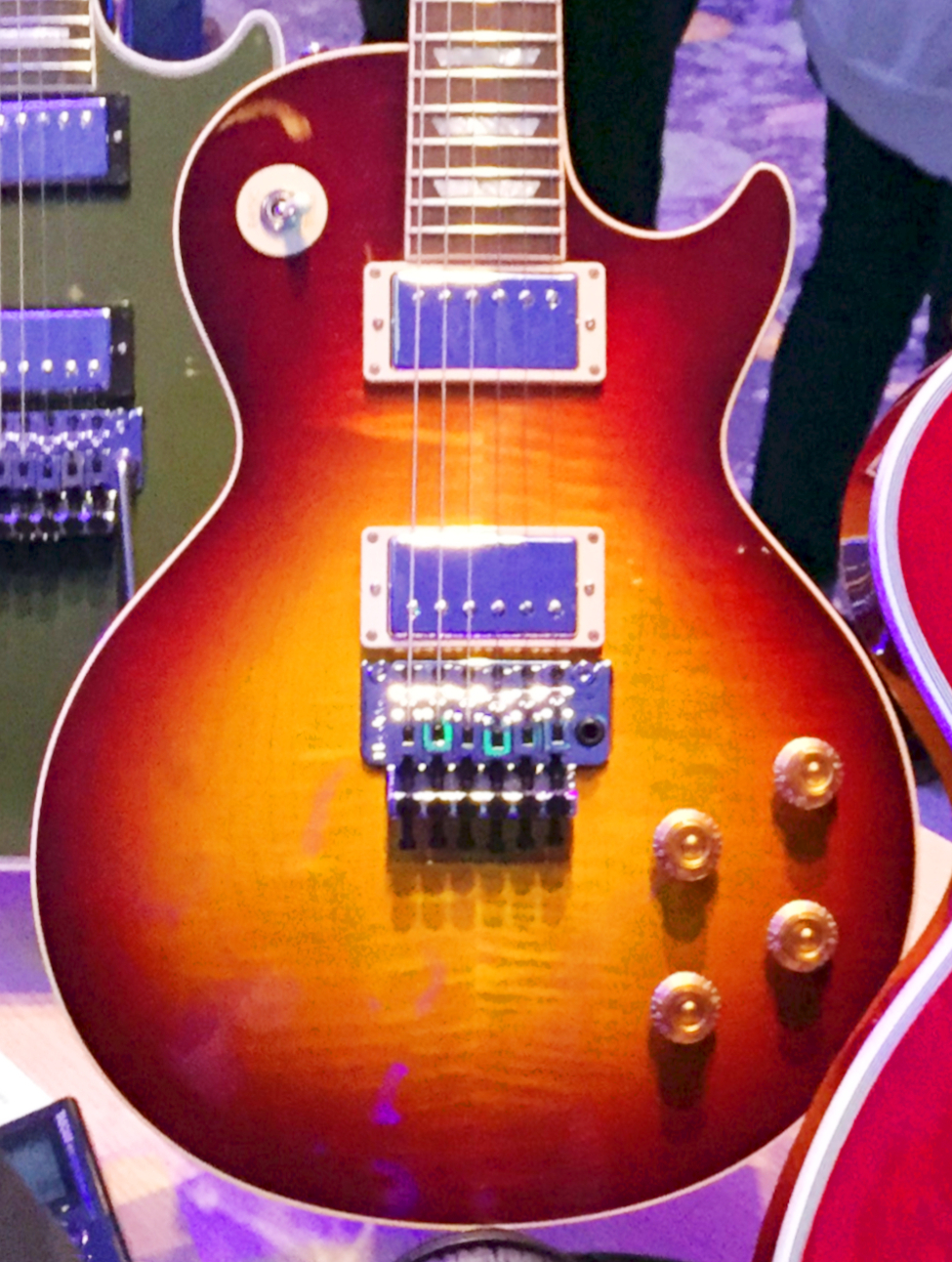
[vibrato system] Floyd Rose

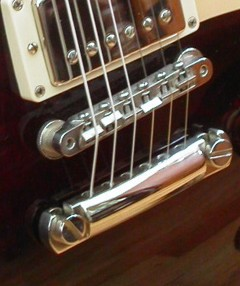
Typical stoptail bridge with Tune-o-matic and stopbar

The term stoptail refers to either of two bridge constructions on solid body electric or archtop guitars. In common to both types is the defining piece of hardware, the stopbar.

A stoptail bridge is distinct from a trapeze bridge or a vibrato system. While using a stopbar is technically possible even with a trapeze or where the string is run through the body of the guitar ("string-through"), such configurations are rare.

Stoptail (or stopbar) pieces are installed either with or without a separate proper bridge (that sets the intonation and above which the string vibrates freely and at the intended pitch). When the stopbar itself is the bridge, it may also be referred to as a "wraparound" bridge, with the string being typically inserted into the stopbar from the neck end of the guitar, passed through and then wrapped over the top of the stopbar, in the process turning through nearly 180°. (However, the term "top-wrapping" is usually reserved for where the bridge proper is separate from the stopbar, and there is a choice of whether to wrap over the top of the stopbar or through it once towards the neck and not over, before running the string over the bridge proper.)

By virtue of the fact that stoptail bridges are not vibrato bridges, they usually make for a "hardtail" guitar. However, not all hardtail guitars have stoptail bridges.

== Construction and materials ==
A stopbar tailpiece is, as the name implies, a bar-shaped formed metal piece commonly made of pot metal or zinc alloys although aluminum and brass may be used. The stopbar has holes drilled into it that allow the guitar strings to be threaded from the rear and out through the front.

Many manufacturers claim that the use of lightweight metals and alloys, such as aluminum, provide a greater transfer of the string's vibrational energy or "resonant quality" to the guitar body since there is less mass to excite. Aluminum was also used in the early examples of stoptail bridges from the 1950s, so it carries the mantle of "vintage" vibe.

The "stop" part comes from the fact that the string ends are held in place or they "stop" inside the bar. The bar is mounted on top of the guitar body usually by means of sturdy threaded metal studs screwed into threaded sleeves embedded into the body of the guitar.

== Stoptail with separate bridge ==
In this configuration, the bridge consists of two parts: an adjustable fixed bridge piece, such as a Tune-o-matic and a separate stopbar (or stop bar) tailpiece. The studs and stopbar are located behind the separate bridge piece.

The stopbar can either simply slip onto notches on top of the studs, or be held in place using set screws. One danger to be aware of is that the stopbar can fall out of the notches when changing strings and put a ding in the guitar's finish. When it is held in place using the screws, it is sometimes referred to as a "locking stopbar". In these designs, the Tune-o-matic bridge section is also usually fastened to its embedded studs by set screws. The string path then goes over the bridge saddles and the string nut to the machine heads located on the headstock. The stopbar tailpiece can be raised or lowered to change the angle at which the strings meet the bridge.

Some players, like Duane Allman, deviate from the norm and "top wrap" their strings. This is when the direction of the string path is reversed so that the strings are threaded through the leading edge of the stopbar then come out the rear and wrapped over the top of the stop bar. The advantage is that strings are supposedly easier to bend because of the decreased string break angle. Also, the "nonspeaking" string length is increased, which may have an effect on the strings' harmonic vibration (see sympathetic resonance). The increased tendency for the strings to produce natural harmonics may make techniques such as pinch harmonics easier to accomplish. This is the same way that a wraparound stoptail bridge is strung. Regardless of the technique used, the tension provided by tightening the strings to pitch is the only thing keeping the stopbar in place, unless it is a "locking" type.

== Wraparound bridge ==
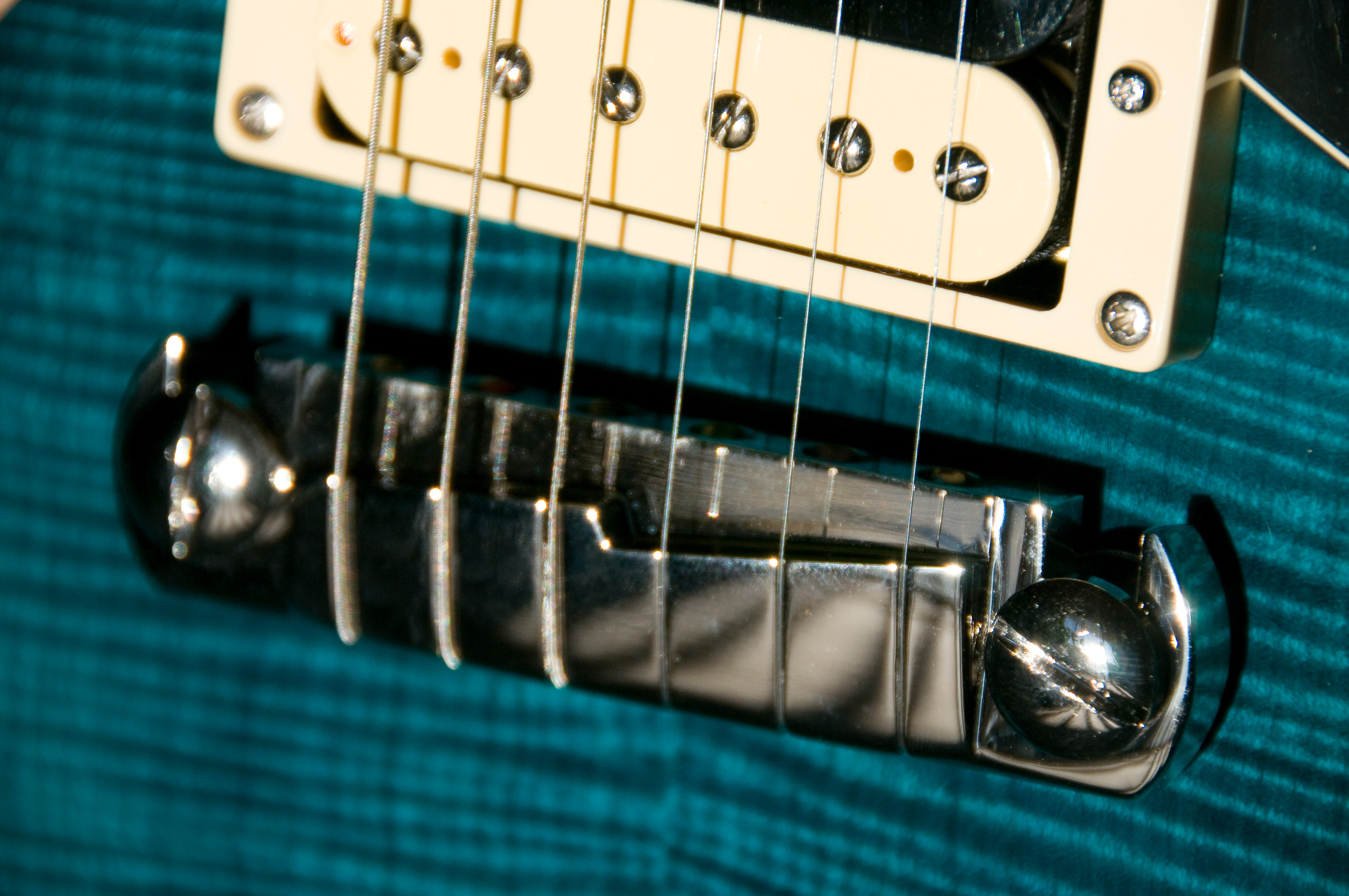
Wraparound guitar bridge (compensated) on a PRS SE Custom guitar

A variant of a stoptail bridge is the wraparound. Wraparound style bridges are used on less costly models such as the Gibson Melody Maker and on expensive, high-end guitars like PRS Guitars. This style bridge combines the bridge and stopbar into one unit. There are a variety of wraparound bridge designs. They may have individual movable bridge saddles (adjustable stoptail bridges), a fixed compensated saddle similar to an acoustic guitar bridge, or simply a straight stopbar anchored in the bridge position.

== Bibliography ==
- Burrows, Terry (2015-12-15). "Strings and Stringing". The Les Paul Manual. Voyageur Press. ISBN 978-0-7603-4923-6.
