= Gibson Sonex =

Range of electric guitars

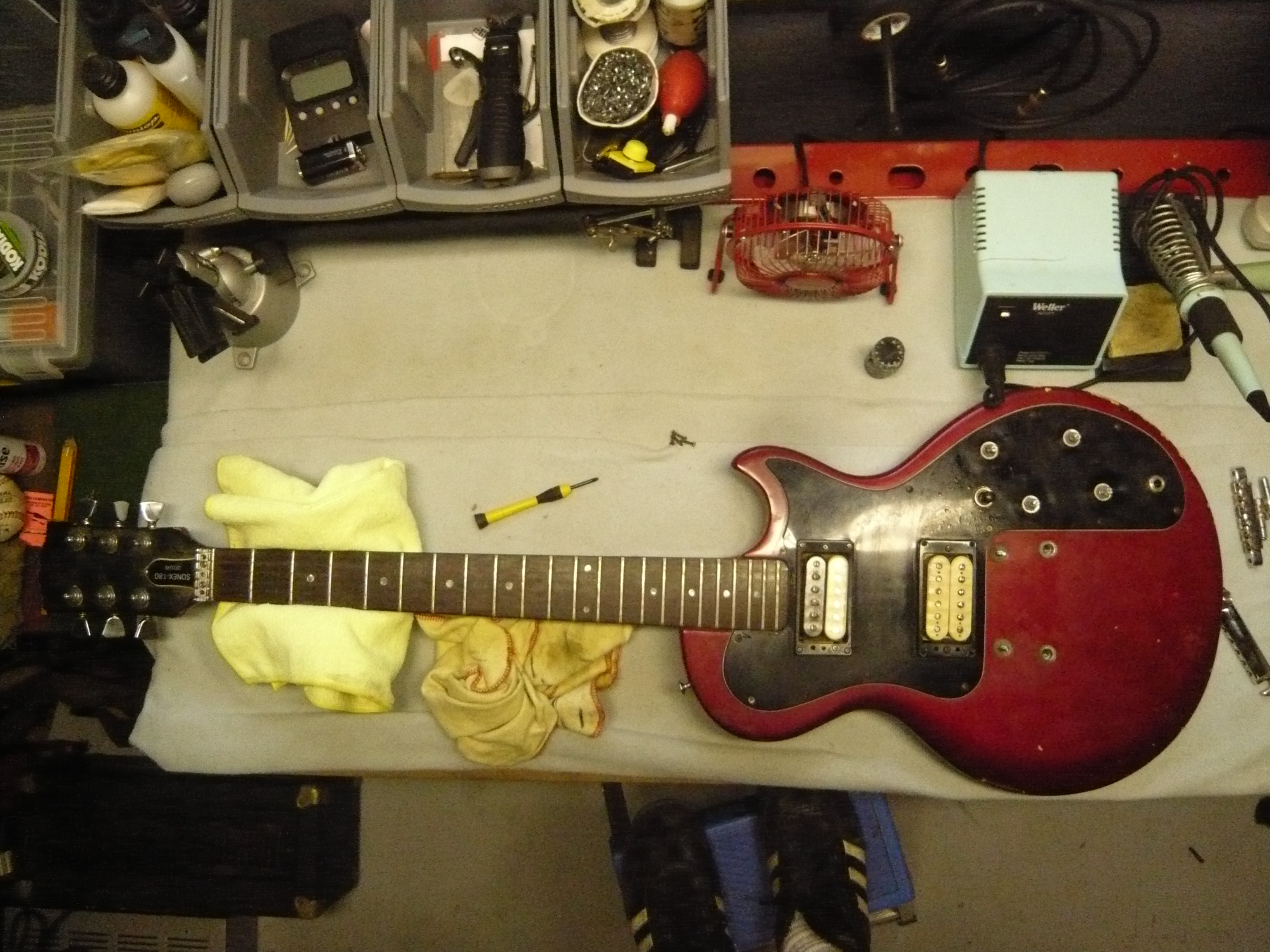
- Gibson Sonex 180 Deluxe (under repair).
- Manufacturer: Gibson
- Period: 1980–1984

Construction
- Body type: Solid
- Neck joint: Bolt-on neck
- Scale: 24.75 in (629 mm)

Woods
- Body: Epoxy resin with a wooden core, marketed as "Resonwood"
- Neck: Maple
- Fretboard: Rosewood

Hardware
- Bridge: Tune-o-matic adjustable
- Pickup(s): Velvet Brick Zebra Humbuckers (Deluxe) Dirty Fingers Zebra Humbuckers (Standard, Custom)

Colors available
- Offwhite, Silver, Candy Apple (Red), Ebony (Black)

The Sonex guitars were a range of Gibson electric guitars launched in 1980. They were made from a synthetic material called Resonwood, and manufactured with Multi-phonic body construction. There were four models: Deluxe, Standard, Custom and Artist.

They replaced the Marauder and S-1 guitars. Like these two instruments, the Sonex took its styling from the Les Paul guitars that had been popular for the previous decades, but using Resonwood instead of mahogany, bolt-on necks instead of set (glued-in) necks, and far less ornamentation.

- Note: "The Sonex Multi-phonic™ body is composed of Resonwood surrounding an inner tone wood core. The tone wood core not only acts as the anchor point for the neck, it also adds acoustic resonance and exceptional body resilience. The Sonex body is so resilient, that its structural properties survived extreme testing in temperatures ranging from −40 °F to 180 °F."

Thus, the Resonwood was a coating used on a solid, usually mahogany body.

At its launch in mid 1980, the Sonex 180 Deluxe cost $299 which was Gibson's cheapest instrument. The Standard was $375, Custom $449.

There were four guitar models to choose from in the Sonex Series, all with the Gibson single cutaway design. The Sonex-180 Deluxe featured a rosewood, dot inlaid fingerboard and adjustable exposed Zebra Dirty Fingers Humbuckers. All came With a three-position pick-up selector switch, Tune-0-Matic Bridge', stop bar tailpiece and volume/tone control speed knobs. The Sonex Deluxe, the lowest price model, used Velvet Brick humbucker pickups, not Dirty Fingers. The Bricks were designed by Bill Lawrence, working for Gibson. They feature a unique steel mounting plate on the back of the pickup that differs from all other Gibson pickups, and has 2 height adjustment screws on one side and one on the other side. They are also black and cream coils, although some were made with the neck pickup in a single color.

In 1981, the Standard was dropped, replaced by the Artist series which was priced at $749. By 1982 the Custom had been discontinued. By 1984 only the Deluxe was left priced at $419.

The Standard and Custom models featured the same Dirty Fingers pickups with a coil tap switch. The Custom has a three-piece maple neck and ebony fingerboard. The Custom was available in white finish, as well as ebony.

The most common finishes were (in order): ebony, white, burgundy, silverburst and solid-color silver. Less than 100 (by factory record) solid-color silver units were produced, making it the rarest of the Sonex models.

Notable users of the Sonex included Jimmy Bower, sludge/doom metal pioneer and founding member of Crowbar, Eyehategod, Superjoint Ritual and Down. Allan Harper of the Limitations, ca 1987-1990 who played the Sonex through a Gallien Kruger aluminum cone combo to achieve a trademark tone. Lee Ving of Fear played a Gibson Sonex during the band's October 31, 1981 appearance on Saturday Night Live and may have subsequently used it during the sessions for their first album The Record immediately afterward, since those sessions took place in November 1981. Thurston Moore of Sonic Youth used a Sonex strung with four strings and with the frets removed, which he played with drum sticks.

== See also ==
- Gibson S-1
- Gibson Marauder
- Gibson Guitar Corporation product list
