= Bill Lawrence (guitar maker) =

German-American musician (1931–2013)

Bill Lawrence (born Willi Lorenz Stich; March 24, 1931 – November 2, 2013) was a pickup and guitar designer. Lawrence was born in Wahn in Cologne, Germany and began his musical career in the 1950s as a jazz guitarist, performing under the name Billy Lorento. He died in southern California in 2013.

As a musician, Lawrence created pickups which he felt best suited his needs and performance style. He then worked with Framus and became an endorser, including models as the "Billy Lorento" 5/120. He was also an endorser for Fender in Europe.

Moving to the United States, Lawrence designed pickups and assisted in electric guitar design for Fender, Gibson, Peavey and other companies. While at Gibson from 1968 to 1972, Lawrence helped design the "super-humbucker" pickup and the L6-S. He helped redesign the electronics of the SG and contributed significantly to the S-1 and Marauder, as well as to some bass models such as the Ripper, Grabber, and G3.
