= Gibson Grabber =

Bass guitar introduced in 1973

- Manufacturer: Gibson
- Period: 1973–1983

Construction
- Body type: Solid
- Neck joint: Bolt-on

Woods
- Body: Maple (early models) or Alder (later models)
- Neck: Maple
- Fretboard: Maple

Hardware
- Bridge: Fixed
- Pickup(s): 1 Sliding Pickup (Gibson Grabber), or 3 Pickups (Gibson G3)

Colors available
- Wine Red, Ebony, Natural, Walnut, White and in 1974 the rare Eggplant Sparkle.

The Gibson Grabber is a bass guitar introduced in 1973 along with the Gibson Ripper, both designed by Bill Lawrence.

The Grabber featured a bolt-on 34 1/2 in (876 mm) neck similar to Fender basses and shared a similar body shape with the Ripper. A distinctive feature of the Grabber was its adjustable pickup, which could be positioned by the player to simulate a neck or bridge pickup position, or in between, to provide further tonal variation. The pickup was brighter than the traditional Gibson style humbuckers. The Grabber had one volume and tone control each, and a removable bridge cover. The Grabber was originally built with a thin, maple body, but it was changed to alder in 1975. 1975 was a peak year for Grabber sales, with 2,637 units sold, due largely to its high-profile use by Kiss bassist Gene Simmons. The Grabber was available in wine red, ebony, natural, walnut and white finishes along with a very rare Eggplant Sparkle used by Gene Simmons for the Kiss Alive album shoot. It was basically Gibson’s wine red (transparent) color with multi colored glitter applied to the finish between layers. The Grabber was discontinued in 1982, though small numbers were produced as late as 1984.

Later, another model of the Grabber was produced, called the Gibson G3. This bass had three stationary pickups mounted in the neck, bridge and middle positions. A three way switch was added to the control scheme so that the pickups could be activated as humbucking pairs: neck and middle, bridge and middle, or all three in humbucking configuration nicknamed a "buck and a half". Although very similar, the Grabber and G3 have different and unique sounds which led players to prefer one over the other.

Notable users of the Grabber are Lou Barlow (Dinosaur Jr) Mike Dirnt (Green Day) and Krist Novoselic (Nirvana).

== 2009 Reissue ==
In 2009 Gibson produced a limited reissue of the single adjustable pickup version of the Grabber. It was limited to 350 models, all with a black finish.

== See also ==
- List of Gibson players
