= Yezda Urfa =

Chicago progressive rock band (1973-1981)

- Origin: Chicago, Illinois
- Genres: Progressive rock; symphonic rock; experimental rock
- Years active: 1973–1981
- Label: Syn-Phonic Music
- Members: Brad Christoff; Phil Kimbrough; Marc Miller; Mark Tippins; Mike Barry; Ron Platt
- Past members: Rick Rodenbaugh; Mike Davies; Chuck Nuzo; Gary Stewart

Yezda Urfa was an American progressive rock band founded in the fall of 1973. The band recorded two albums before breaking up in the spring of 1981. The band's music is currently distributed by Syn-Phonic.

== Name ==
The name Yezda Urfa comes from Yazd, Iran and Urfa, Turkey. The band came across these names while leafing through the dictionary, looking for a band name. Yazd was changed to Yezda to ease pronunciation. In the Russian language "yezda" (ездá) is a noun meaning a "ride" or "drive", however this is apparently incidental.

== Sound ==
Described as a blend of Yes and Gentle Giant, Yezda Urfa was known for playing high-energy progressive rock. Break-neck tempos, changing time signatures, and diverse instrumentation were hallmarks of their sound.

== Members ==
The original members:

- Rick Rodenbaugh – vocals
- Phil Kimbrough – keyboards, mandolin, wind, vocals
- Mark Tippins – guitar, vocals
- Marc Miller – bass, cello, marimba, vibes, vocals
- Brad Christoff – drums, percussion

Members during the live concert:

- Ronnie Platt — vocals
- Michael Barry — keyboards
- Mark Tippins — guitar, vocals
- Marc Miller — bass, vocals
- Brad Christoff — drums, percussion

== Discography ==
- Boris - Demo album 1975 (CD re-releases 2004, 2009, 2010 & 2012)
- Sacred Baboon (recorded 1976, released 1989) CD re-releases 1992 & 2010)
- YEZDAURFALIVE - NEARfest 2004 (2010) CD and MP3 release recorded live at NEARfest 2004
