= Tune-o-matic =

Electric guitar bridge

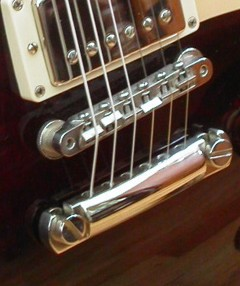
"ABR-1" style Tune-o-matic bridge with thumbwheel adjustment and a stopbar

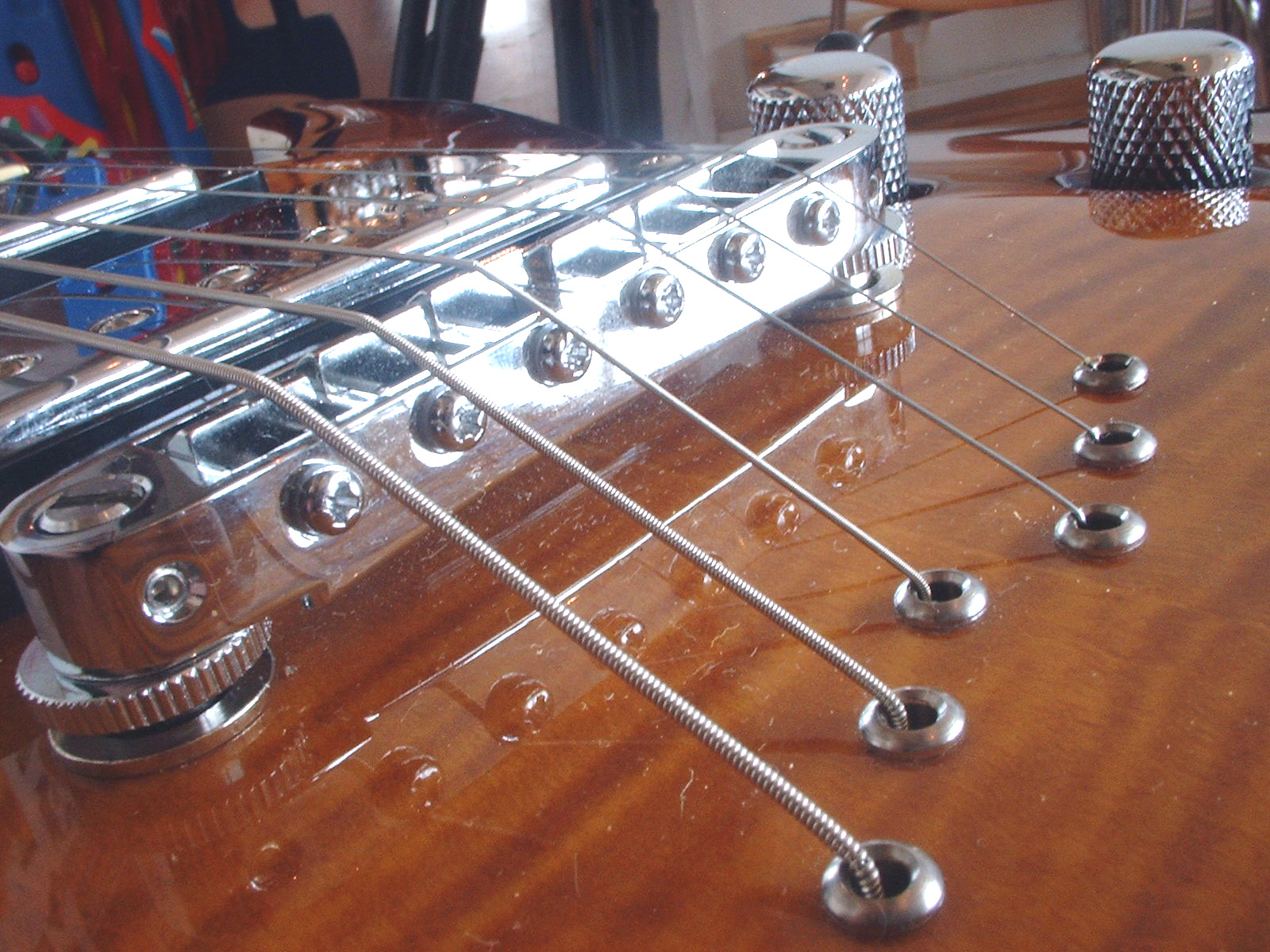
"Nashville" style Tune-o-matic with "strings through the body" construction (without a stopbar) and screw slots facing away from the neck, note that the saddles are reversed, an incorrect orientation

Tune-o-matic (also abbreviated to TOM) is the name of a fixed or floating bridge design for electric guitars. It was designed by Ted McCarty (Gibson Guitar Corporation president) and introduced on the Gibson Super 400 guitar in 1953 and the Les Paul Custom the following year. In 1955, it was used on the Gibson Les Paul Gold Top. It was gradually accepted as a standard on almost all Gibson electric guitars, replacing the previous wrap-around bridge design, except on the budget series.

== Function ==
Guitar strings, especially steel strings, are not ideal vibrators. Generally the thicker the string, the shorter the effective length. This refers to the length of string involved in producing a sound, as opposed to the length between the nut and the bridge. Many guitar designs with fixed bridges have the bridge slanted or stepped so that the distance from the nut to the bridge is larger for thick strings. The Tune-o-matic extends this idea to make the distance adjustable for all the strings, within limits.

== Variations ==
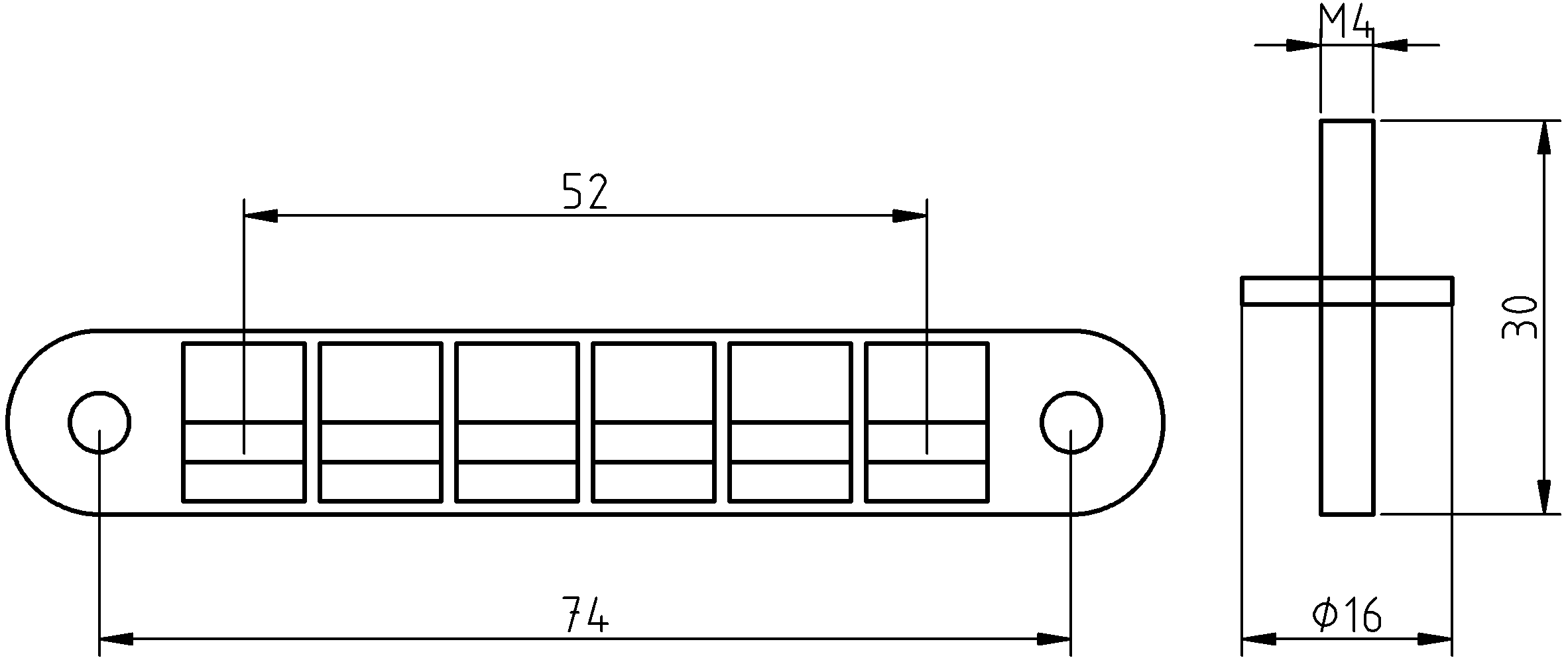
Measurements of a typical Tune-o-matic bridge

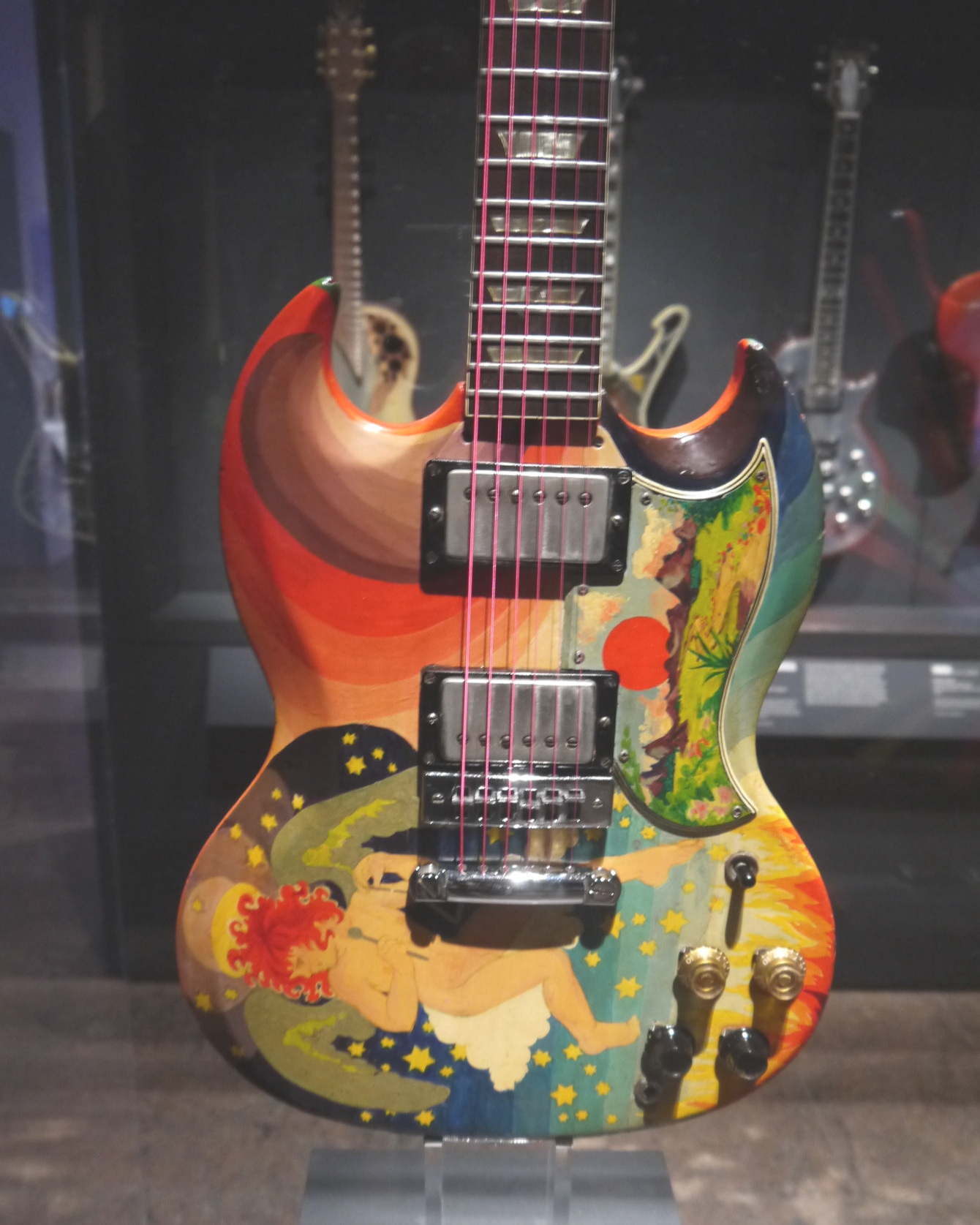
Schaller Wide Travel Tune-o-Matic a.k.a. Harmonica bridge on The Fool

Since its invention, different versions by Gibson have been used: • ABR-1 without retainer wire: 1954–1962 • ABR-1 with retainer wire: 1962–1975 • Schaller Wide travel Tune-o-Matic a.k.a. "Harmonica bridge": 1970-1980 (Kalamazoo plant) • Modern TOM a.k.a. "Nashville" bridge: 1975- First introduced when Gibson moved Les Paul production from Kalamazoo to the new Nashville plant. It is still a signature feature found on guitars from the Gibson USA product line.:

== Construction ==
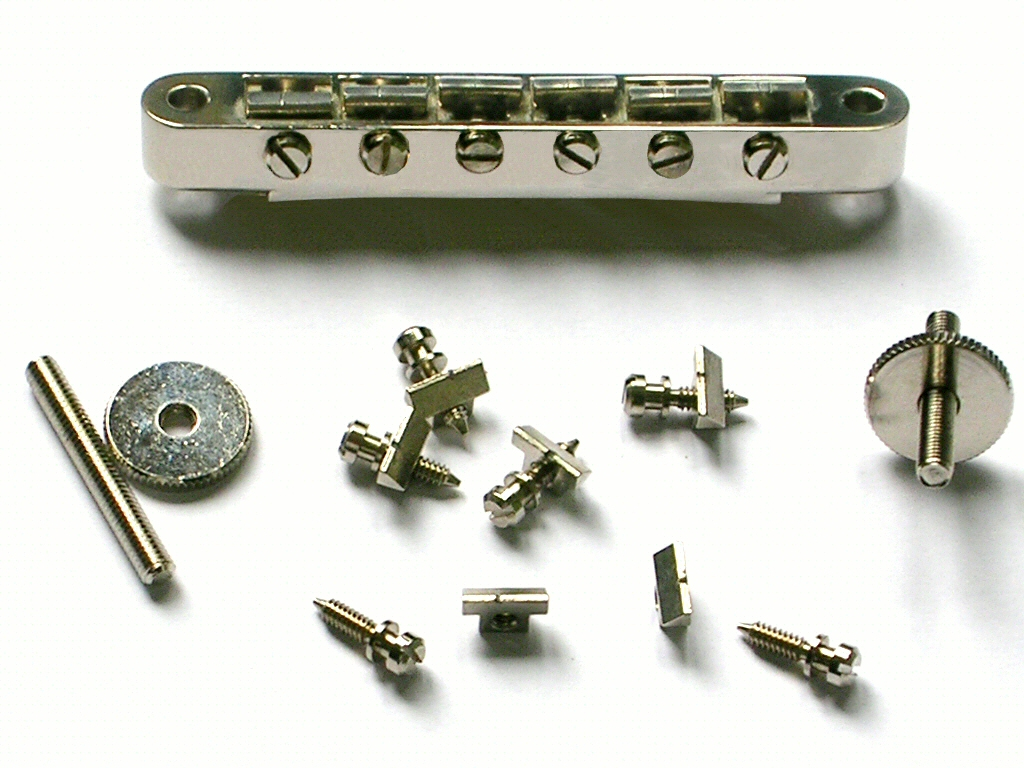
Disassembled Tune-o-matic

Both the ABR-1 and Nashville Tune-o-Matic bridges consist of one oblong saddle which holds 6 saddle inserts and their corresponding string length (intonation) adjustment screws. Later ABR-1 bridges also have a saddle retainer wire that holds all the saddle inserts and screws in place. Both are mounted to guitars via two threaded posts that may be screwed directly into the guitar's solid body (old style), or into threaded anchors that are pressed into the body. These bridges are also used on some archtop hollowbody guitars, such as the Gibson ES175D, which use a floating rosewood or ebony base (or foot) with two threaded posts screwed directly into it.

To adjust the string height (action), the Tune O Matic bridge sits atop two threaded wheels screwed on to its threaded posts. Some have integrated wheel posts that thread into anchors, but they are less common. Non-Gibson models often incorporate screw heads on the bridge posts.

Each saddle insert has a small groove that matches string gauge and shape to keep the string from slipping off the saddle insert. When fully assembled, each string sits astride a saddle insert and thus marks the end of the string's vibrating length from the string nut to the saddle insert.

After passing over the saddle insert, each string makes a slight downward angle toward the stopbar tailpiece, vibrato, or on hollowbody guitars a trapeze tailpiece. Some solid body guitars have "strings through the body" construction. Whichever way the strings are held, the fact that the string makes a downward angle after the saddle creates "break angle". Break angle keeps the string from popping out of the saddle insert's groove because the angle causes the string to sit tightly over the saddle. Break angle also contributes to the guitar's sustain and on an acoustic guitar, its volume. There is also break angle created over the nut caused by the headstock pitching back.

The Tune-o-matic bridge is not absolutely flat. Ideally, the radius should match the fretboard radius for the most comfortable playing experience and standard Gibson Tune-o-matic bridges have a 12-inch (300 mm) radius.

Due to its symmetrical design, it's possible to accidentally fit the bridge on backwards on the two posts. This can lead to a certain amount of confusion if the bridge is ever removed for any reason. Conventionally, the string length (intonation) adjustment screw heads of the ABR-1 bridge face the neck, and the screw heads of the newer "Nashville" bridge face the stopbar. Unless the player wishes to completely reset the action and intonation, it is important to refit the bridge in the same orientation as before a string change, regardless of which way round it was to start with.
