= Gibson ES Series =

Series of hollow body electric guitars

The Gibson ES series of semi-acoustic guitars (hollow body electric guitars) are manufactured by the Gibson Guitar Corporation.

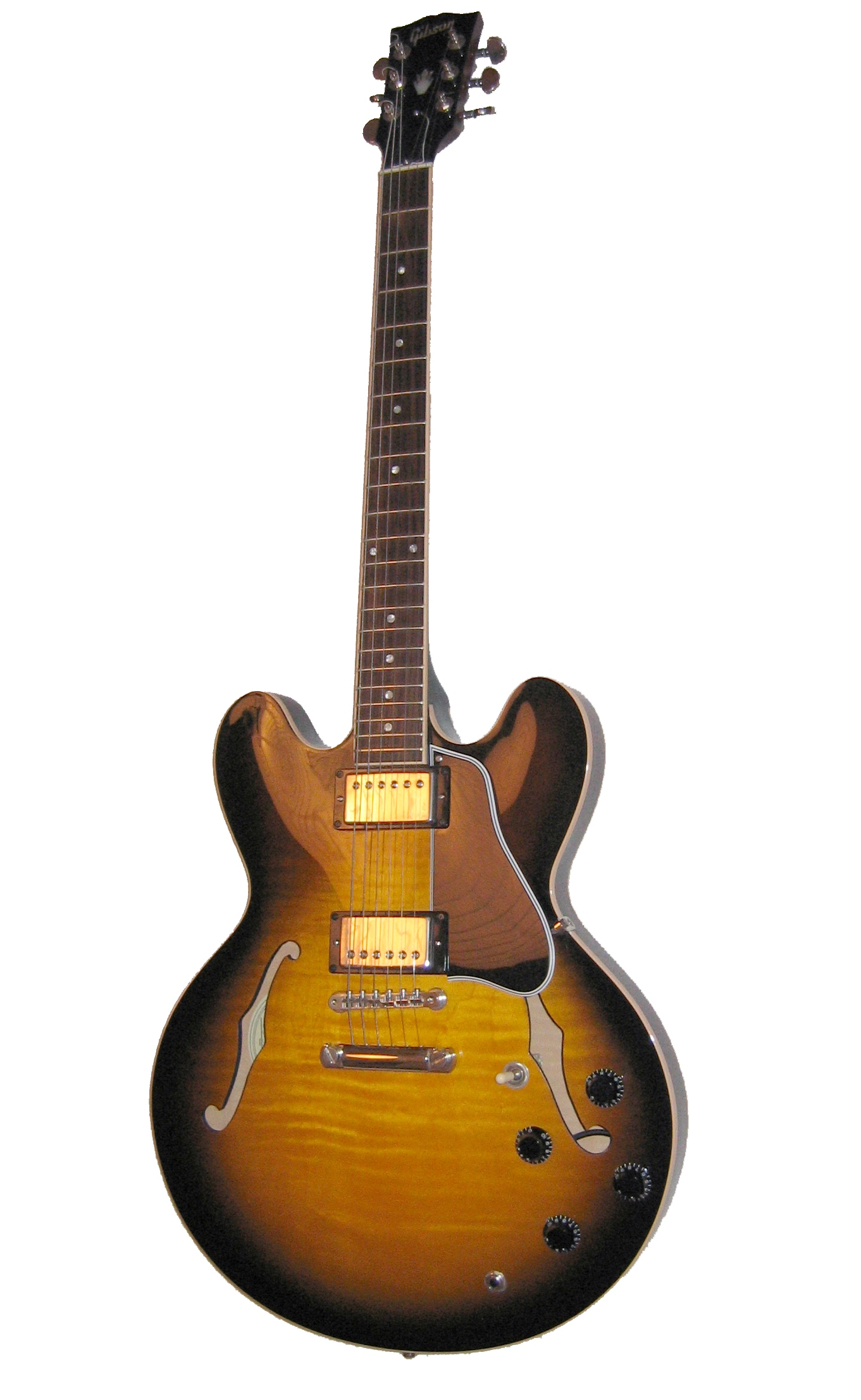
A Gibson ES-335, the best-selling and most popular ES Series model

The letters ES stand for Electric Spanish, to distinguish them from the EH (Electric Hawaiian) line of lap steel guitars which are played flat on the lap. Many of the original numbers referred to the price, in dollars, of the model. Suffixes in the names indicate additional appointments, for example "T" means "thinline" (a thinner profile than most) while "D" means "double pickup". Many of the models come with f-holes, though some, such as B.B. King's signature Lucille series, are made without f-holes. Some models are full-bodied models, while single- and double-cutaways are also available. Two different styles of cutaways are used, both named by Gibson after Italian cities. Florentine models had a sharper, more pointed end on the cutaway, while more rounded and contoured cutaways were called Venetian style.

Numerous signature models of the ES series exist, as well as some later hybrid models such as the "ES-Les Paul" that combines features of a Gibson Les Paul with those of the ES series.

ES Series guitars were built at Gibson's Memphis, Tennessee factory from 2000 until 2019. After Gibson's change of ownership in 2019, the Memphis factory was closed and production was moved back to Nashville, Tennessee.

== Models ==
=== ES models ===
- ES-5 (1949–1955) Three-pickup, full depth hollowbody. / (1955–1962) ES-5 Switchmaster
- ES-100 (1938–1941) Entry-level archtop hollow-body model. (Renamed to ES-125)
- ES-120T (1962–1971) Most basic student model, thinline
- ES-125 (1941–1970) Successor of ES-100. / (1956–1960) ES-125T (thinline).
- ES-130 (1954–1956) (Renamed to ES-135)
- ES-135 (1956–1958) Thick-body version of ES-125TDC. / (1991–2002)
- ES-137 (2002–2013) Upscaled ES-135 with Les Paul sound.
- ES-139 (2013 only) Semi-hollow dealer exclusive, sized between a Les Paul and ES-135. No f-holes. Marketed as a lighter alternative to the Les Paul.
- ES-140 (1950–1957) 3/4 size, short scale ES-175. / (1956–1968) ES-140T (thinline).
- ES-150 (1936–1956) Gibson's first electric guitar, based on L-50. / (1937-?) EST–150 (tenor) and EPG–150 (plectrum) were shipped. / (1969–1974) ES-150DC resembling thick ES-335.
- ES-165 (1991–2013) Single pickup ES-175 based on Herb Ellis's.
- ES-175 (1949–c. 2017) Full depth, florentine cutaway, maple top, 24 3/4" scale. / (1953-) ES-175D (dual pickup). / (1976–1979) ES-175T (thinline hollow-body)
- ES-225T (1955–1959) Variation on ES-125T (thinline, florentine cutaway), with trapeze bridge.
- ES-250 (1938–1940) Rare, fancier version of ES-150. Replaced by ES-300.
- ES-260 (1982–1983) Resembling ES-125T/ES-225T (thinline, florentine cutaway), but semi-hollow with center block, stop tailpiece, and humbuckers instead of P90 pickups.
- ES-275 (2016-2019) Slimmed down L5 hollowbody shape with a 15" upper bout, 2.25" depth, and a Venetian cutaway
- ES-275 Thinline (2018-2019) Semihollow version of the ES-275 with a 2" depth
- ES-295 (1952–1959) ES-175 resembling Les Paul Goldtop with trapeze bridge.
- ES-300 (1940–1952) Successor of ES-250, with a slant-mounted long pickup. Short PU in 1941. Reintroduced with P-90 in 1946, added second P-90 in 1949. Replaced by ES-350.
- ES-320TD (1971–1974) Similar to ES-330TD but with tune-o-matic and metal control plate.
- ES-325 (1972–1979) Similar to ES-330TD but with mini-humbuckers, single f-hole, and a half-moon shaped plastic control plate
- ES-330TD (1958–) Double rounded cutaway, thinline hollow-body
- ES-333 (c. 2001–2003) Stripped-down version of ES-335
- ES-335 (1958–) World's first thinline archtop semi-acoustic (semi-hollow-body with center-block) / (2013–) ES-335 Bass
- ES-336 (1996–2001) Replaced by CS-336.
- ES-339 (2007–) Size of CS-336 with construction of ES-335.
- ES-340TD (1968–1973) ES-335 with a master volume/mixer and phase switch
- ES-345 (1958–1981) ES-335 construction, but with parallelogram inlays, Varitone, and stereo outputs.
- ES-347 (1978–c. 1990s) Alternate ES-345 with a coil-tap switch instead of Varitone
- ES-350 (1947–1956) Rounded cutaway ES-300. / (1955–1981) ES-350T as a plainer Byrdland.
- ES-355 (1958–1982) Upscaled ES-345 (ebony fretboard, extra binding, etc.) with vibrato unit, optional Varitone and stereo outputs.
- ES-359 (2008–) Upscaled ES-339 (ebony fretboard, extra binding, gold hardware, block inlays).
- ES-369 (late 1970s–c. 1980s) ES-335 with Dirty Finger humbuckers, coil tap switch, and snakehead headstock.
- ES-390 (2013–) Similar in size to the ES-339, but with the fully hollow construction of ES-330. Equipped with mini humbuckers (2013 model year) or dog-ear P90s (2014–present).
- ES-775 (1990–1993) ES-175 with higher quality components
- ES Artist (1979–c. 1985) Upscale model of ES-335 without f-holes, with active circuit by Moog.

==== ES signature models ====
ES-333 signature

- Tom DeLonge Signature ES-333 (2003–) Equipped with a single high-output Gibson Dirty Fingers bridge humbucker.

ES-335 signature

- DG-335 (2007–?) Dave Grohl model based on Trini Lopez.
- Trini Lopez (1964–1971) Trini Lopez two versions: Standard model based on ES-335, Deluxe model based on Kessel model, both with diamond-shaped sound holes and a single-side headstock.
- Chris Cornell (2013–) First edition released in 2013 with a limited edition run of 250 released in 2019 - green Olive Drab finish with Jason Lollar Gretsch Filtertron style Lollartron pickups, Bigsby vibrato, and Cornell's signature inlaid on the headstock.

ES-355 derivative signature

- Lucille (1980–1985) B.B. King model based on ES-355TD-SV without f-holes.

ES-330/ES-336 derivative signature

- Johnny A. (2004–) ES-336 sized fully-hollow thinline body with sharp double cutaways that resemble the Barney Kessel model with three variants (all models have 1957 Classic humbuckers and 25.5" scale unless otherwise noted):
  - Signature with Bigsby vibrato
  - Standard with Bigsby vibrato, which has less cosmetic appointments compared to the Signature, nickel instead of gold hardware, and a rosewood fretboard instead of ebony
  - Spruce Top, with a spruce top instead of maple and a stopbar tailpiece instead of a Bigsby vibrato, rosewood fretboard, and Alnico III CustomBuckers instead of 1957 Classics.

=== Derived models ===
- 335-S (1980–1983) Loosely related solidbody guitar similar in shape and controls to ES-335 with two Dirty Fingers pickups.
- CS-336 (2001–?) Custom Shop's first "tonally carved" guitar.
- CS-356 (2001–?) Upscaled CS-336 with goldplate parts, etc.
- Vegas (2006) Offset semi-hollow with similar aesthetics to the Trini Lopez - non-reverse Firebird six-in-line headstock, diamond f-holes, and split-diamond inlays. Two variants:
  - Standard - Plain maple top, ebony fingerboard, '57 Classic humbuckers, four finishes: Ebony, Natural, Sunburst, Wine Red.
  - High Roller - AAA Flame maple top, gold hardware, block inlays, Burstbucker Pro humbuckers, four finishes: Desert Sunset, Felt Green, Neon, Roulette Red.
- Les Paul Bantam/Florentine (1995/1996–c. 2003) Custom Shop models with thinline semi-hollow-body with center-block. (Note: "Gibson USA Florentine" released in 2009 is a solid-body model)
- ES-Les Paul (2014-2016) Mash up of Les Paul and ES-335
- Les Paul Signature (c. 1972–c. 1975)
  - Midtown (2011–2016) Smaller chambered body with f-holes that came in five variants:
    - Standard with dot inlays and BurstBucker humbuckers, as well as optional Bigsby vibrato
    - Standard P-90 with trapezoid inlays and P-90 pickups
    - Custom with humbuckers, block inlays and split diamond headstock inlay, like an ES-355
    - Kalamazoo, with appointments referencing the Byrdland
    - Signature Bass
- EB–2 bass (1958–1972)
- EB-6 6-string bass/baritone guitar (1959–1961: hollow-body similar to EB–2, 1962–1965: SG-shaped solid-body similar to EB-3/EB-0)

=== Related models ===
==== Origin models ====
Note: in the 1920s, L-4 and L-5 were once electrified by Lloyd Loar, but halted by his end of contract in 1924.

- L-4 (1911–) The base model of ES-175 and its derivatives.
- L-5 (1922–) The base model of ES-5, Byrdland, ES-350T, possibly ES-225, and these derivatives.
  - Byrdland (1955–) Thinline, short-scale L-5 CES, named after Billy Byrd and Hank Garland.
  - Super 400 CES ([1934]/1950s–)
- L-50 (1934–) The base model of the first Electro Spanish model, ES-150.
- The Log (1940) A forerunner of the later center-block semi-hollow models, ES-335/345/355.

==== Related signature models ====
- Tal Farlow (1962–1971) Tal Farlow model.
- Howard Roberts Fusion (1980–) Howard Roberts model.
- Chet Atkins Country Gentleman (1987–2000s) Gibson version of the Gretsch Chet Atkins signature model 6120, with Gibson 492R and 490T humbucking pickups instead of Gretsch Filtertrons.
- Chet Atkins Tennessean (1990–2000s) Mid-priced Gibson Chet Atkins signature model designed by Gibson.

==== Related derivative models ====
- EDS–1275 Double 12 (1958–) Doubleneck, hollow-body (1958–1962) or SG-shaped solid-body (1962-) guitar with 12 and 6 string guitar necks.
  Other doubleneck models include:
  - EMS–1235 Double Mandolin (mandolin or short neck guitar & normal guitar, hollow-body (1958–1962) or solid-body (1962-))
  - EBSF–1250 Double Bass (4 string bass & guitar, built-in fuzz effect)
  - EBS–1250 Double Bass (6 string bass & guitar)
  - EDS–1250 (6 string bass & 4 string bass)
- Barney Kessel (1961–1974) Barney Kessel model. 3" deep, double florentine cutaway hollow-body (Two versions, Regular and Custom).
- Johnny Smith (1961–c. 1989) Later renamed as Gibson LeGrande.
  - Solid Formed (2015) - new style archtop using 1/2 the wood by bending it instead of traditional carving. 17" full hollowbody with a venetian cutaway and floating Johnny Smith style humbucker.
- Blueshawk (1996–2006)
  - Little Lucille (1996–2006) another Lucille endorsed by B.B. King.

== Gallery ==
This section provides the photographs of the above mentioned models, to easily identify and grasp each one at a glance.

=== ES models (with signatures and derivations) ===
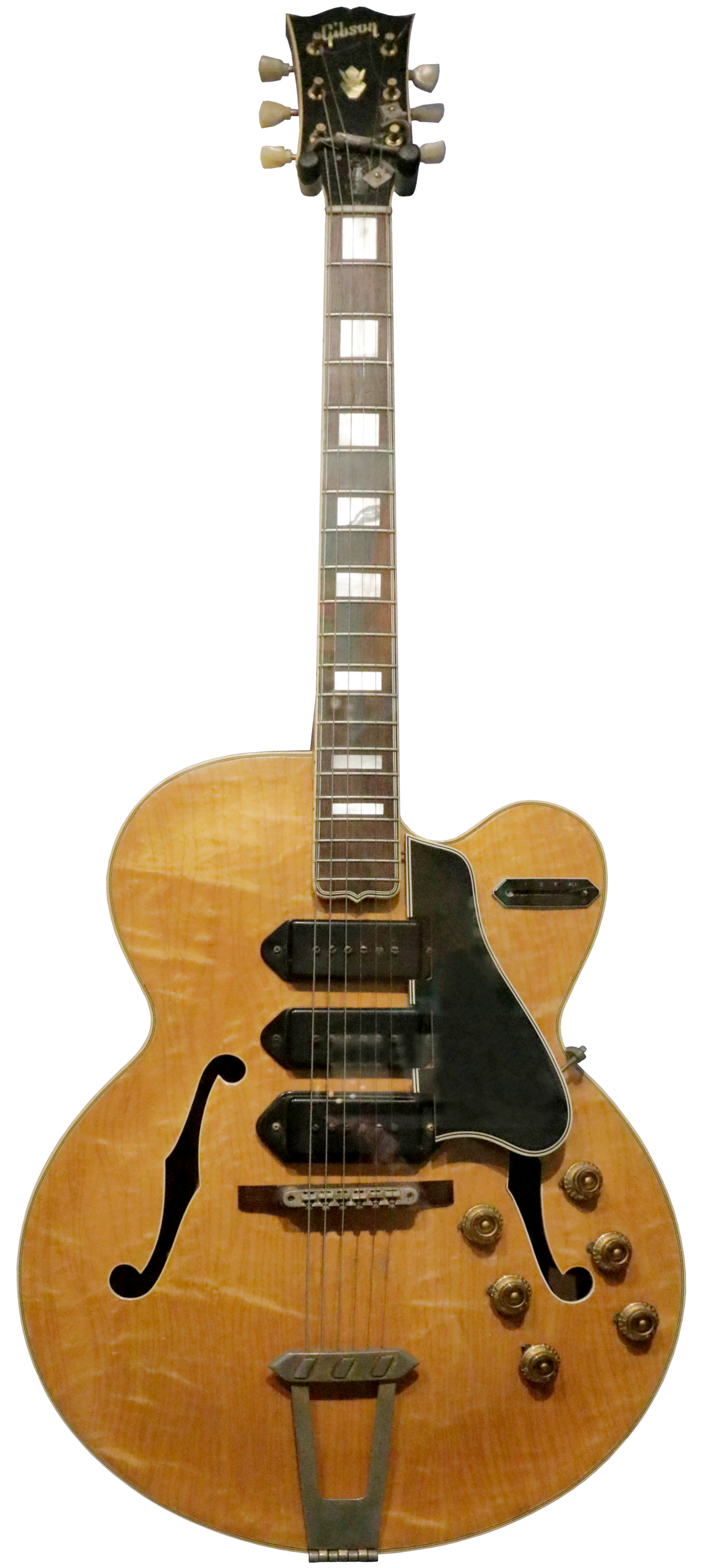
ES-5

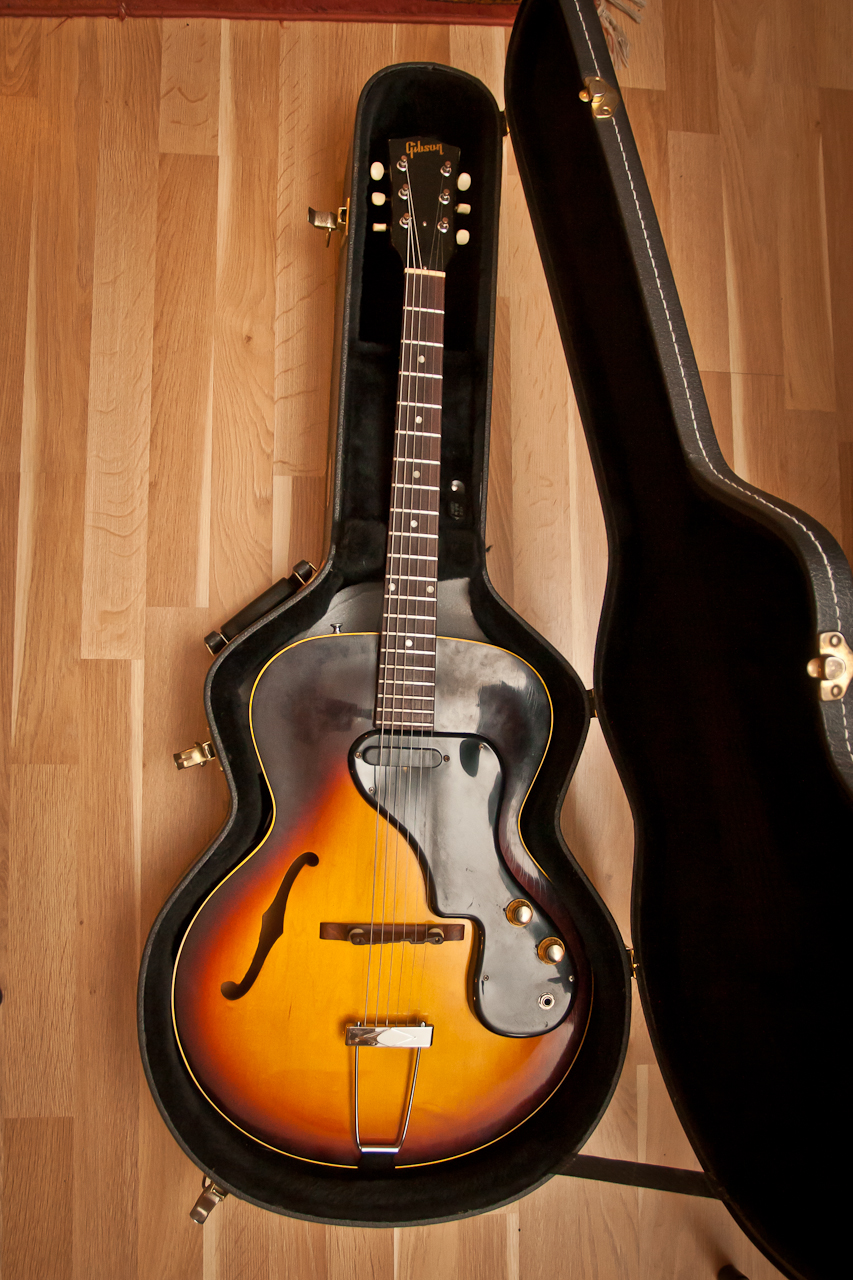
ES-120T

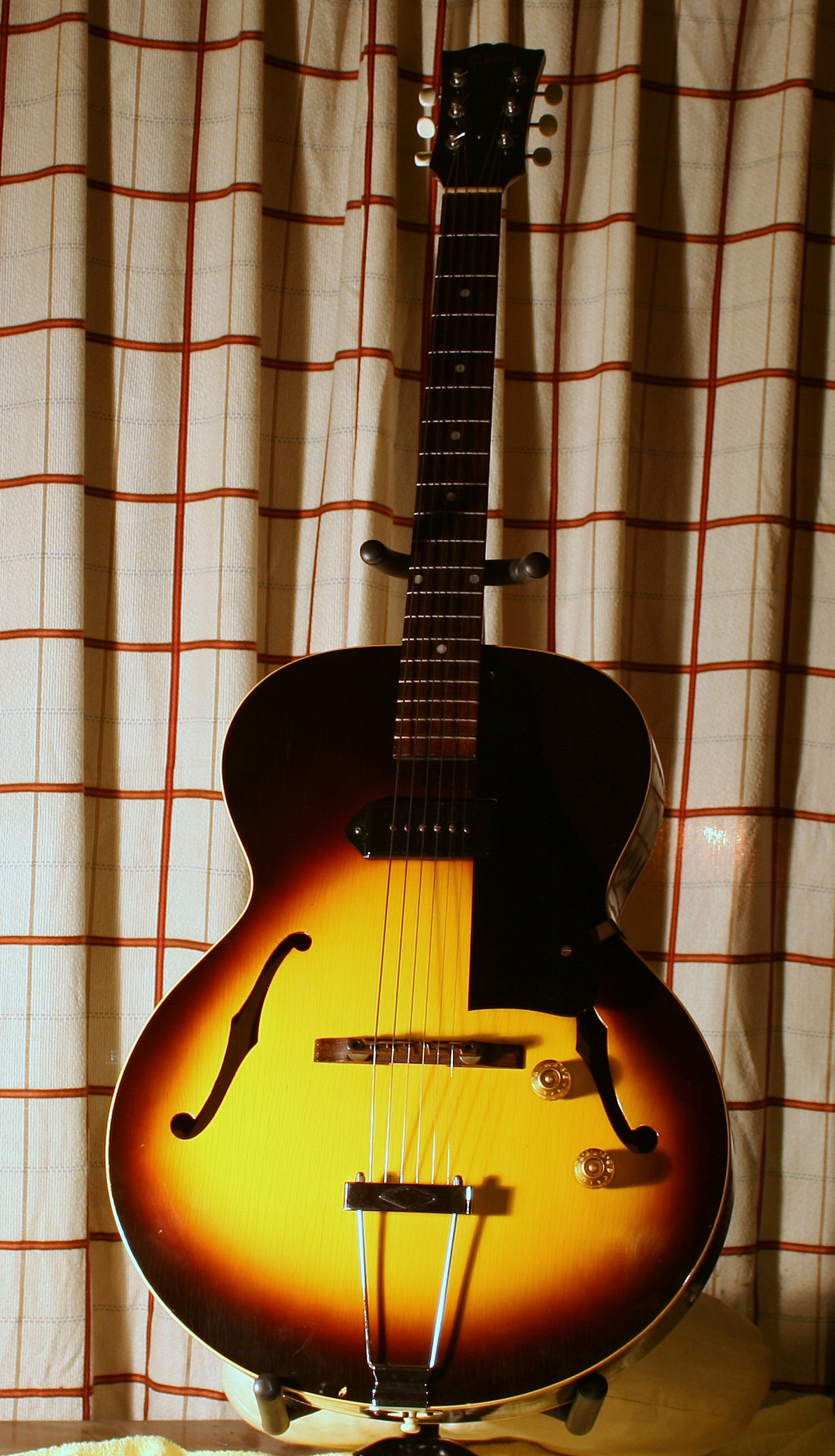
ES-125

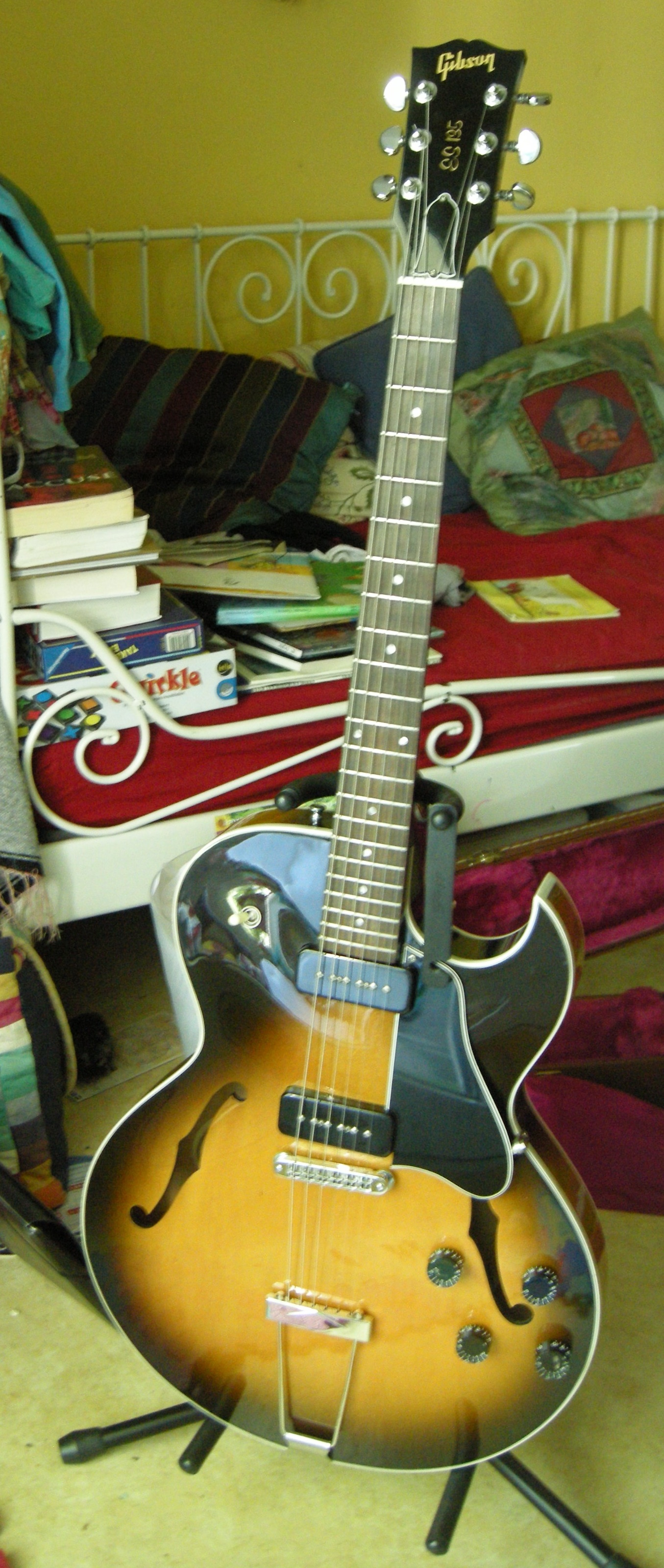
ES-135

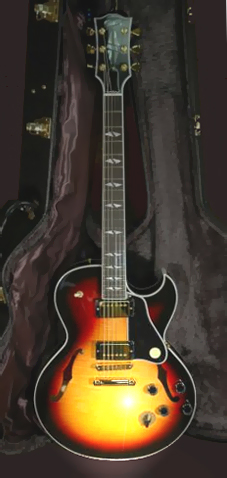
ES-137

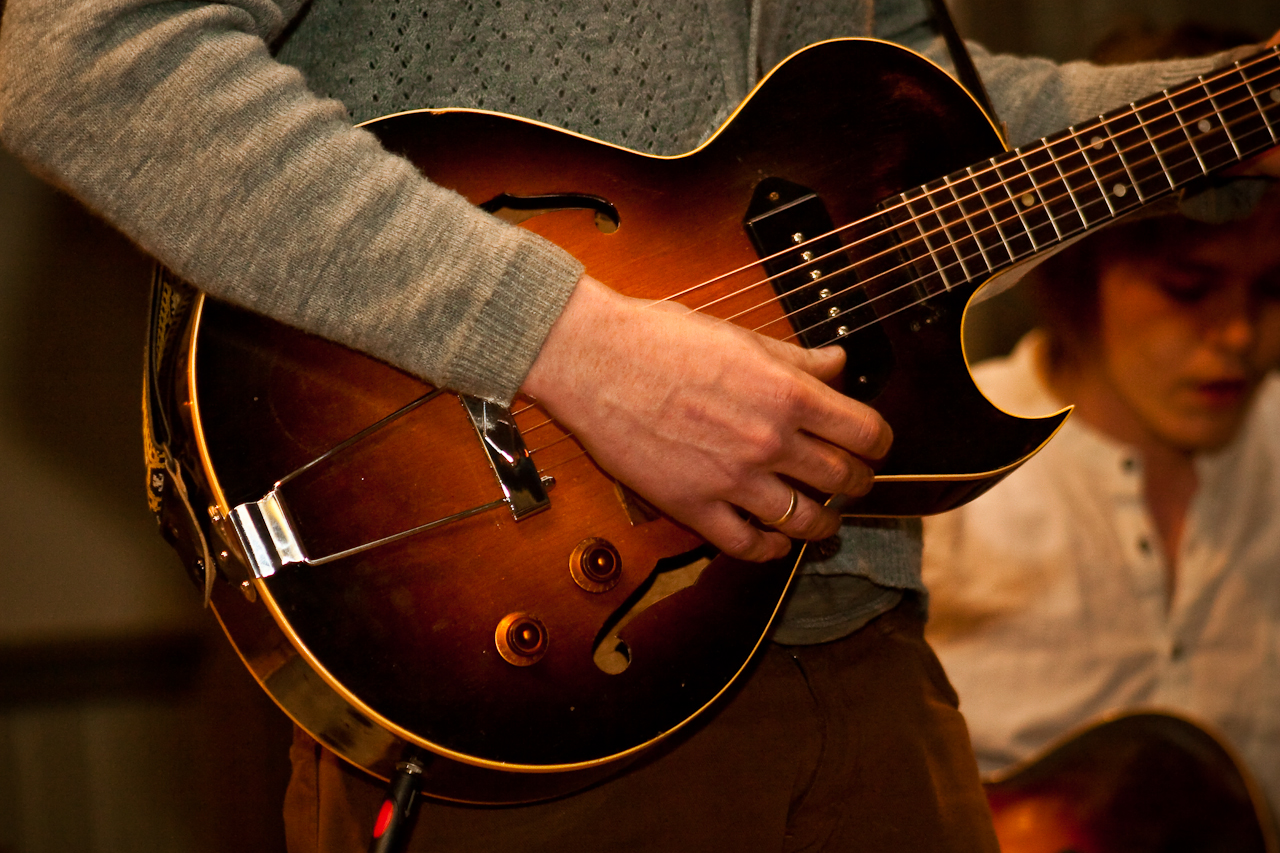
ES-140

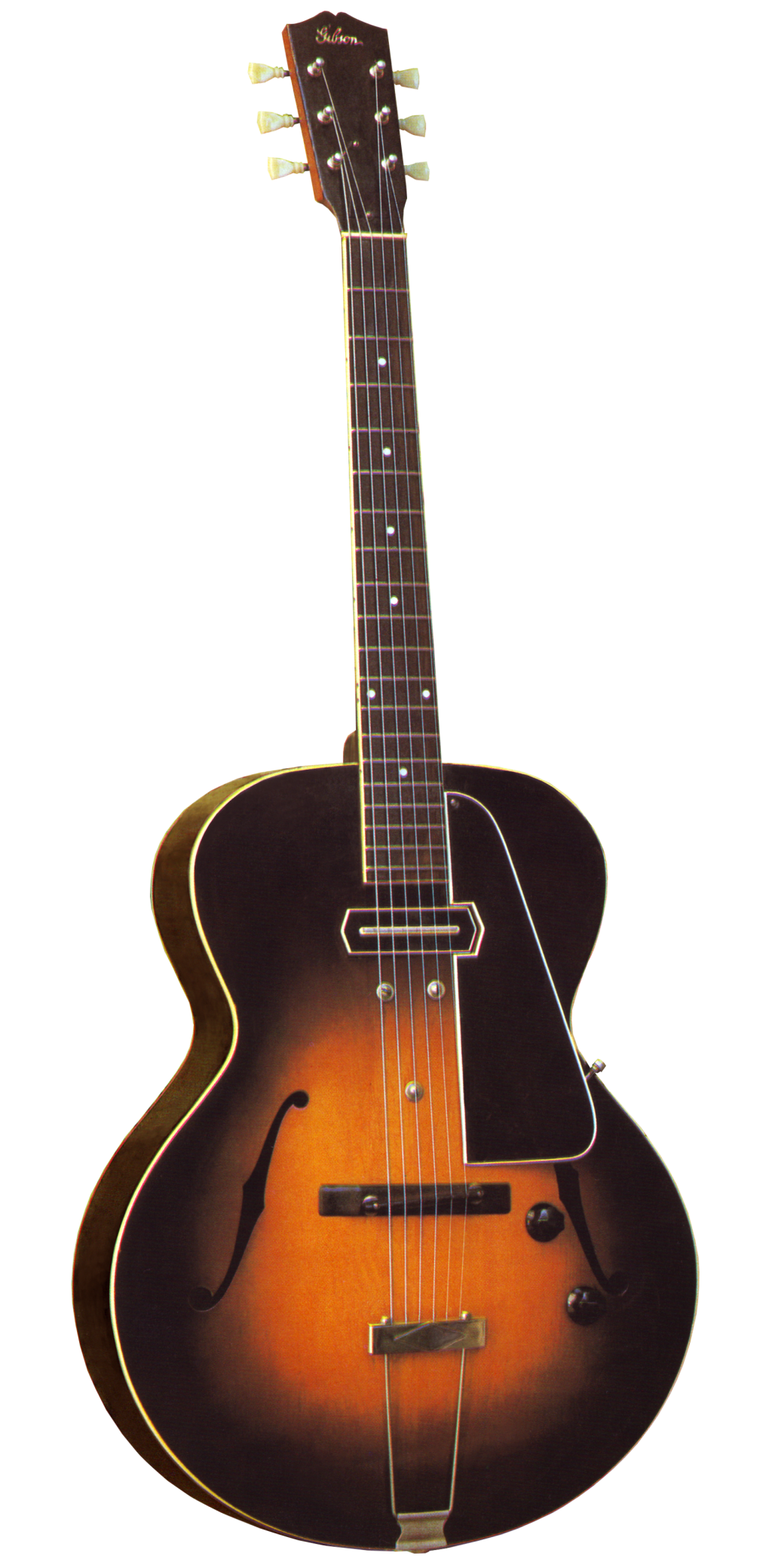
ES-150

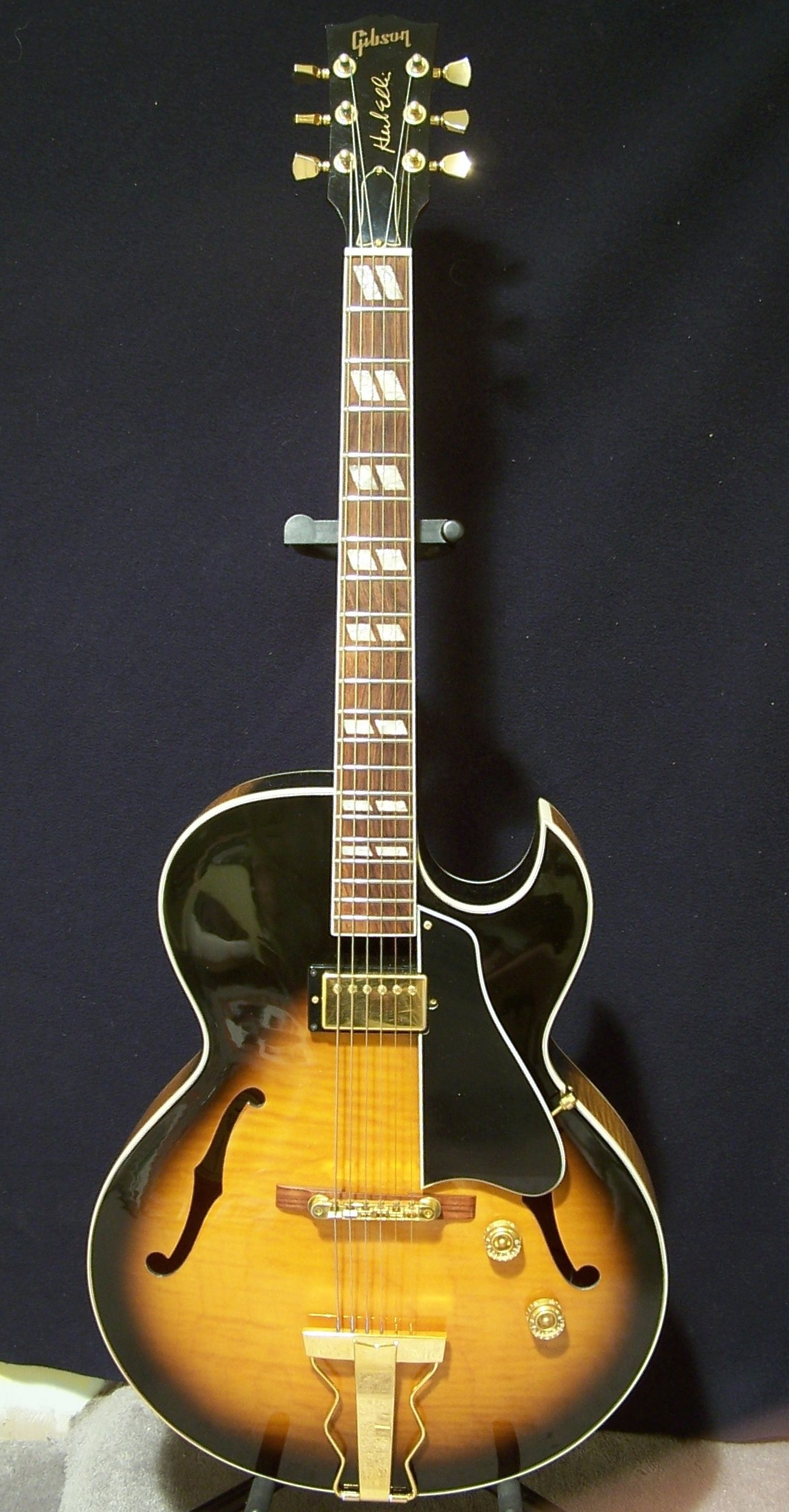
ES-165

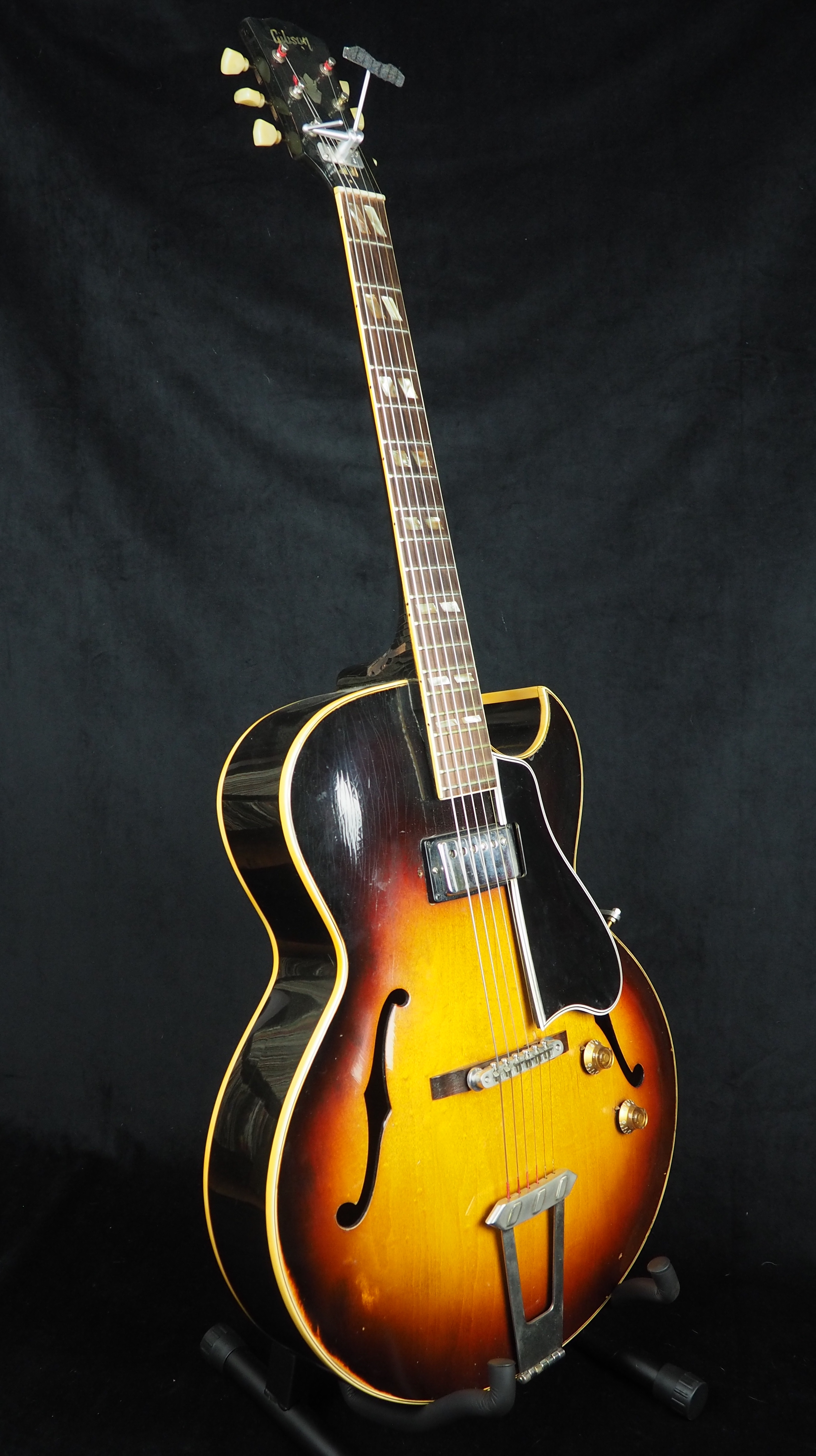
Herb Ellis ES-175

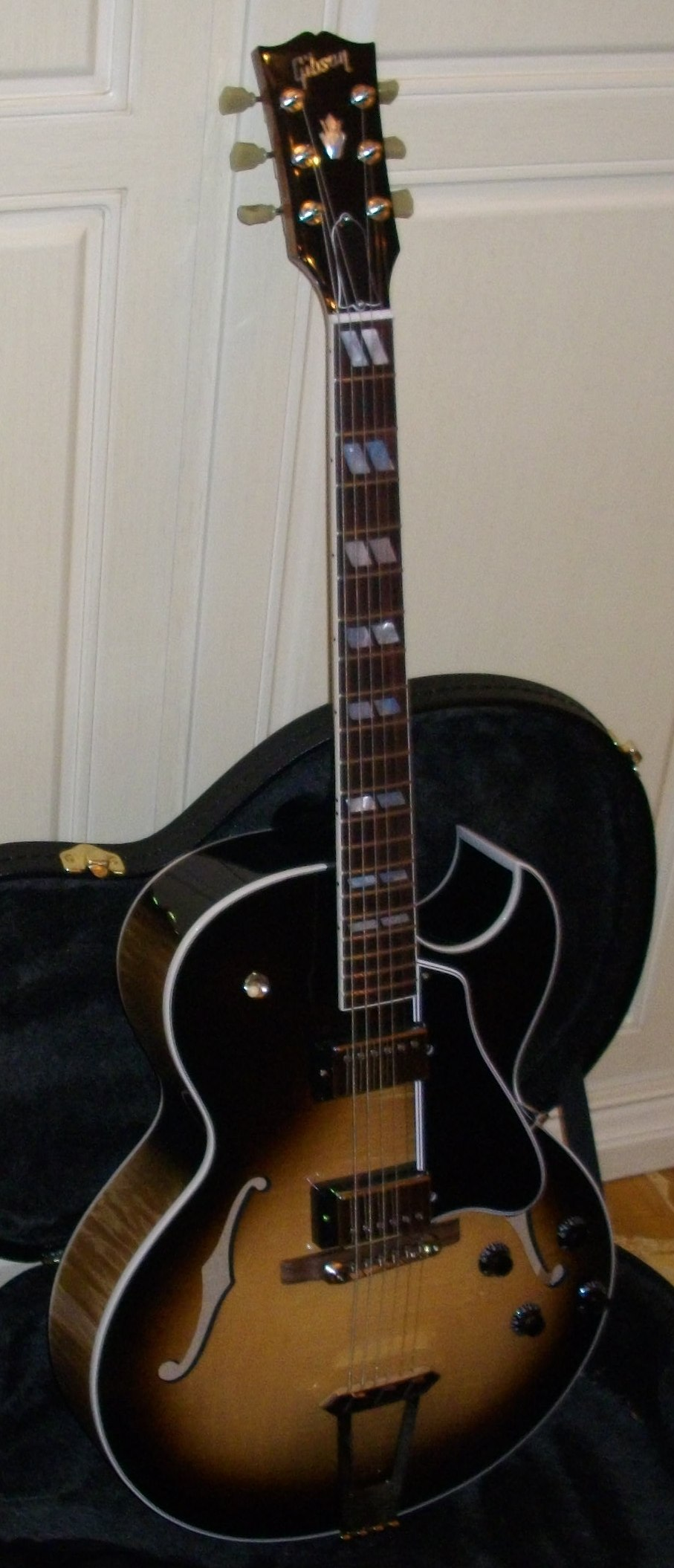
ES-175

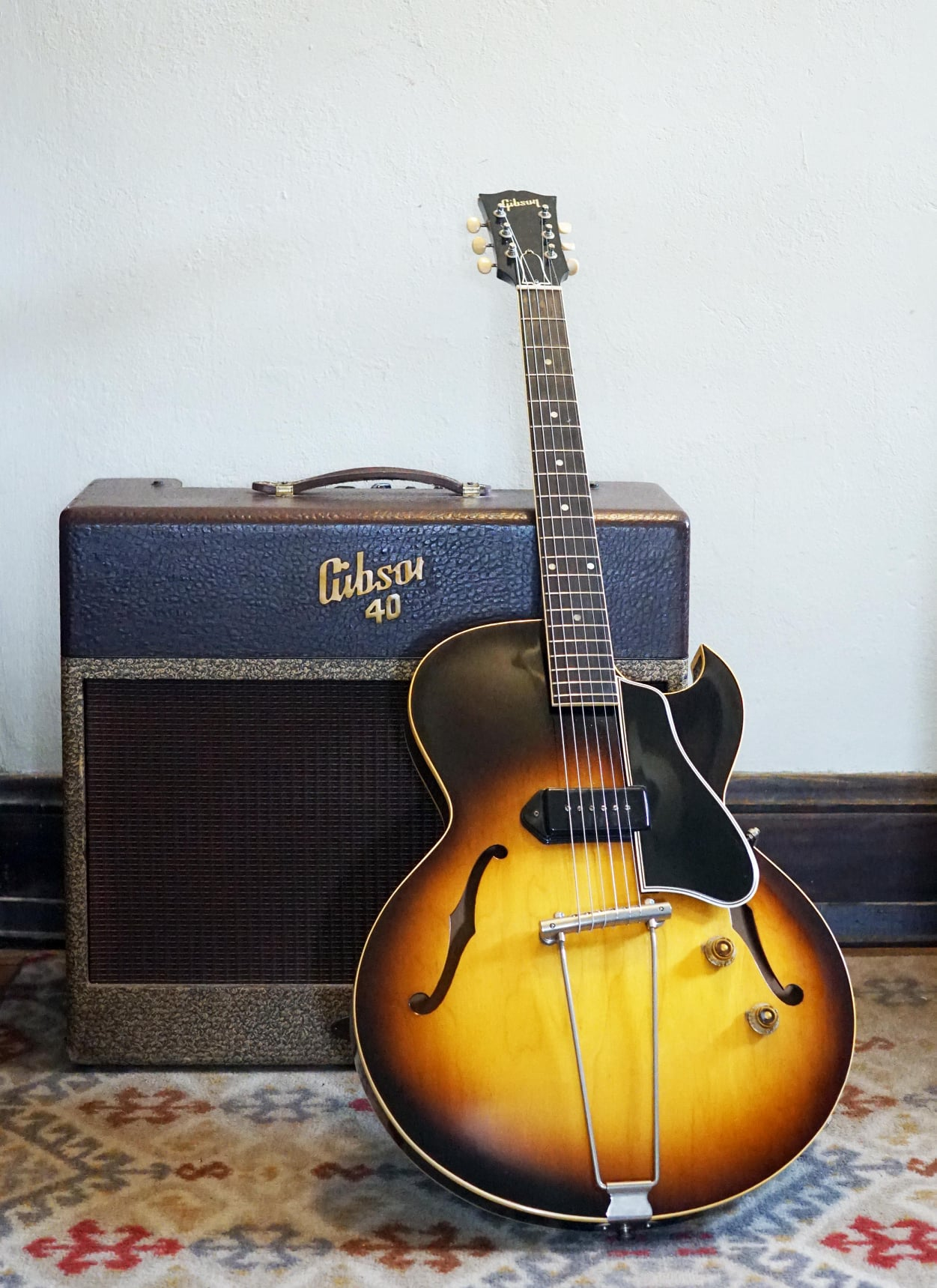
ES-225T

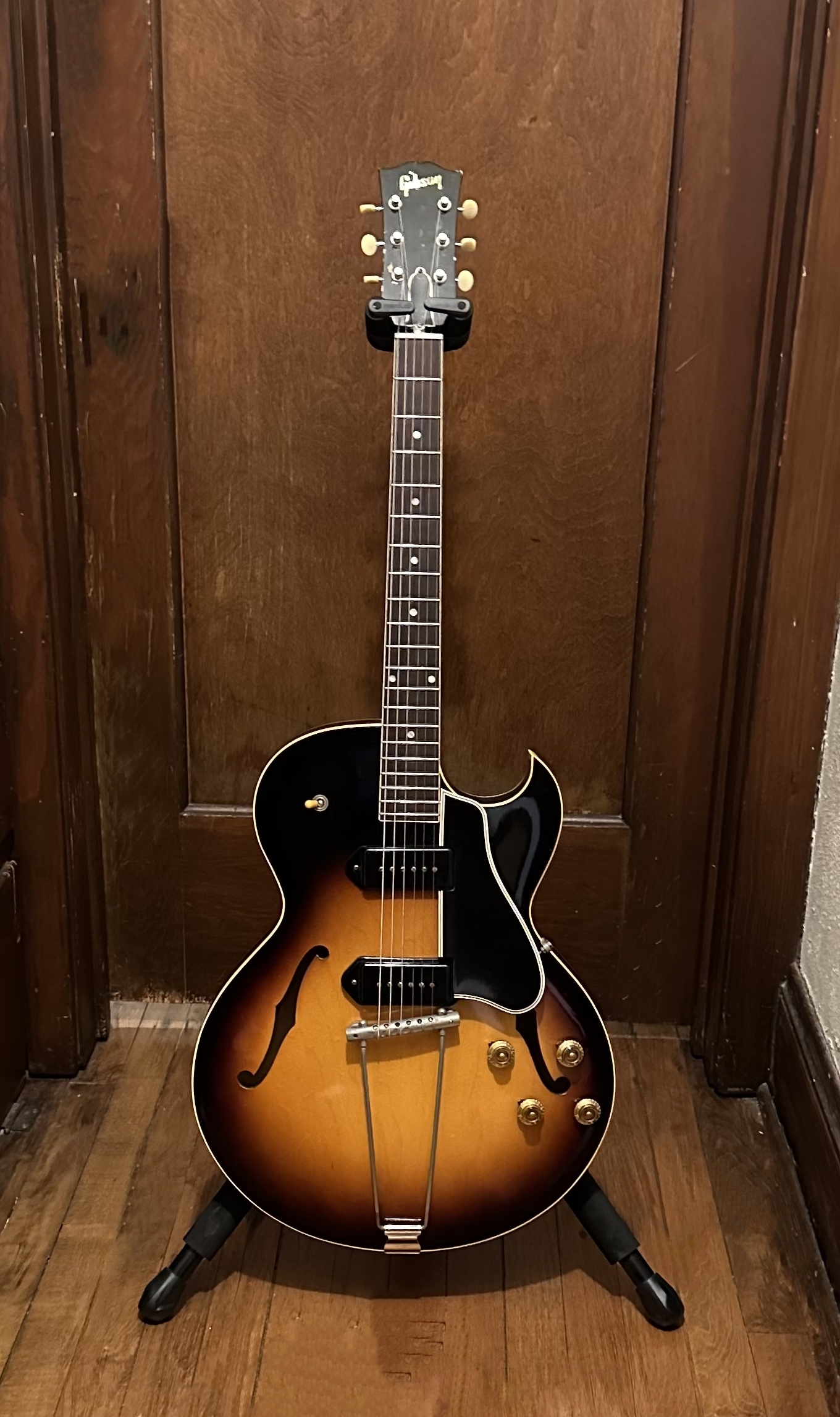
ES-225TD

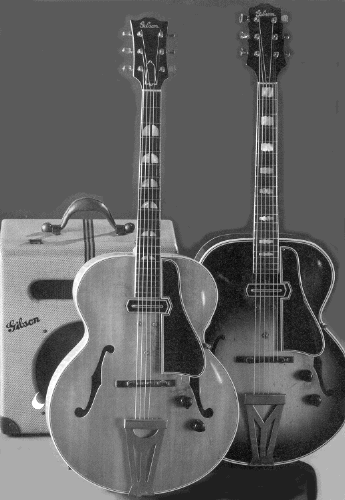
ES-250

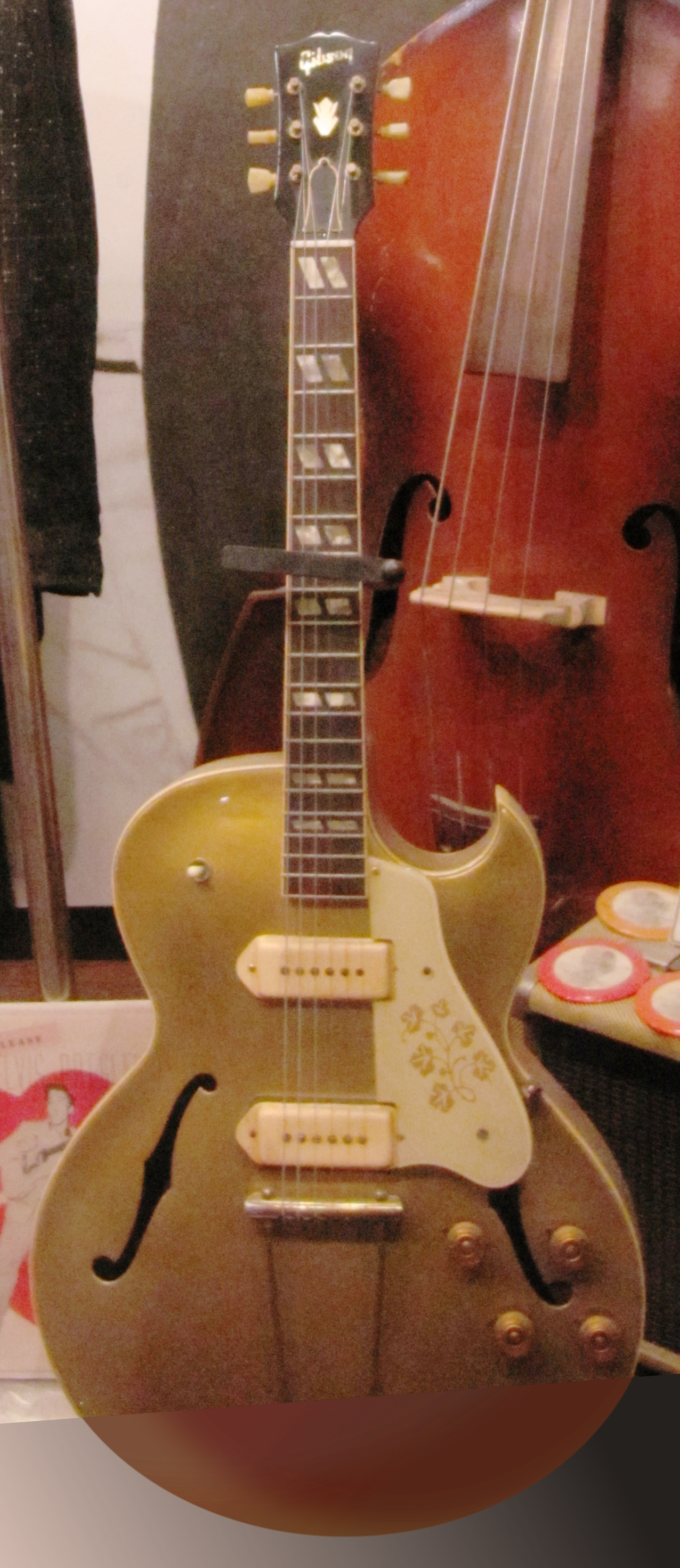
ES-295

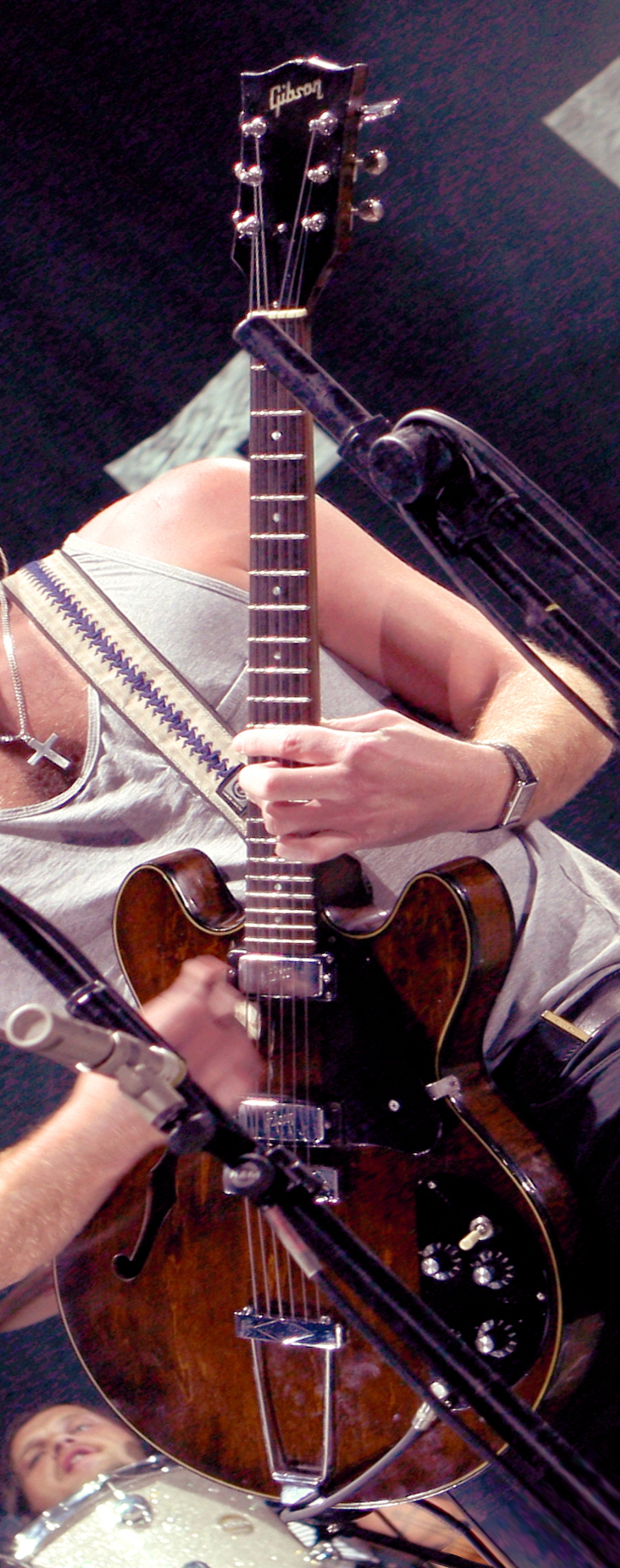
ES-325

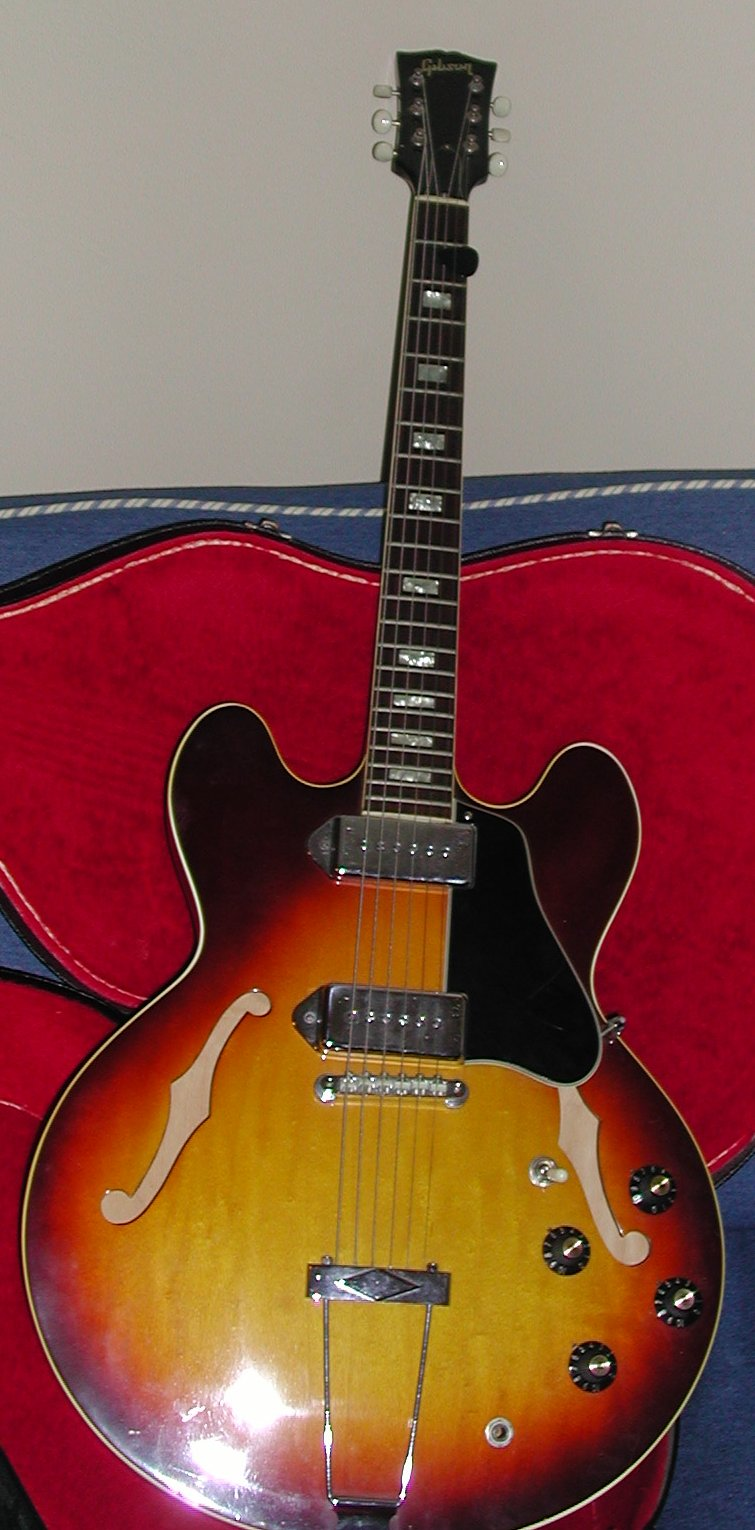
ES-330TD

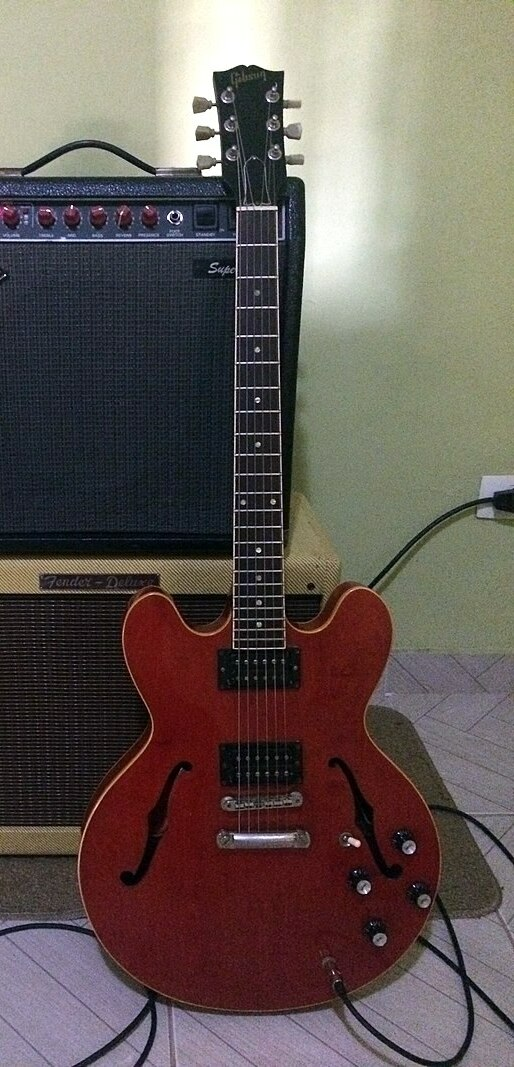
ES-333

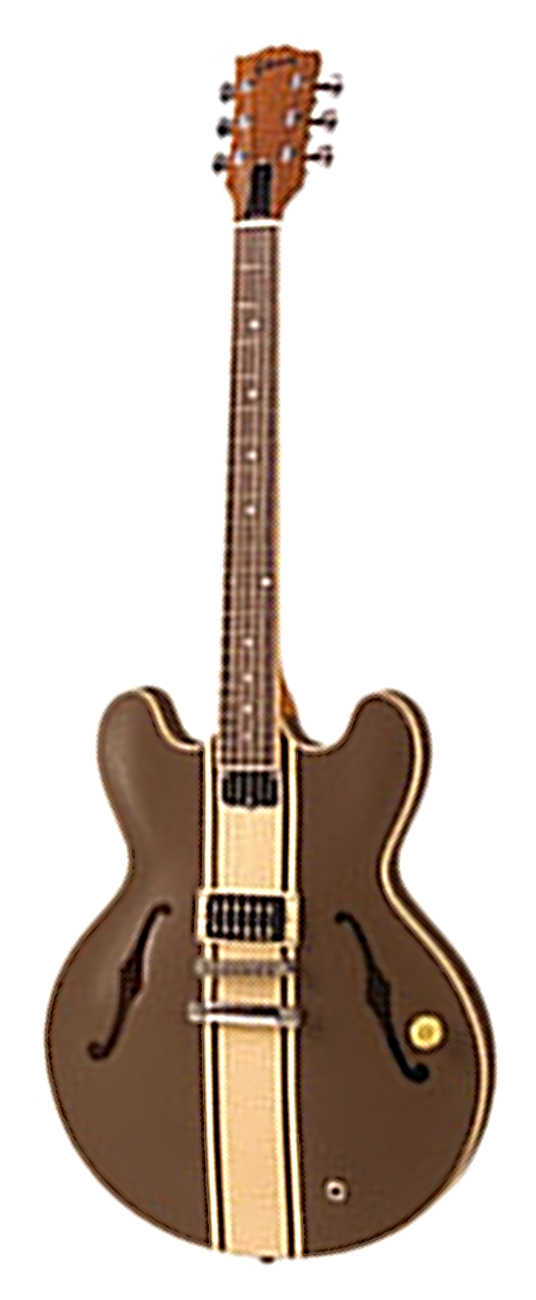
Tom DeLonge ES-333

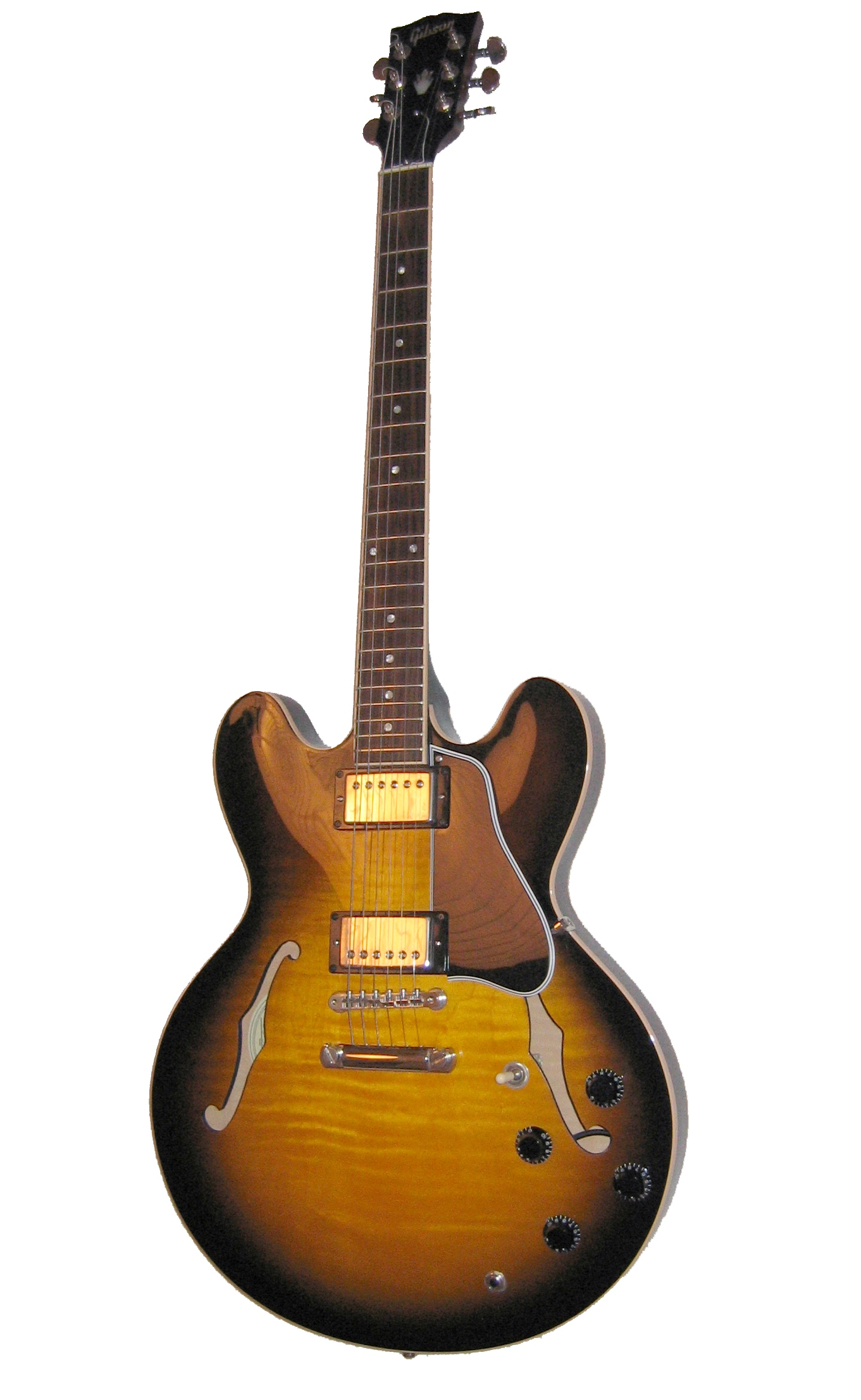
ES-335

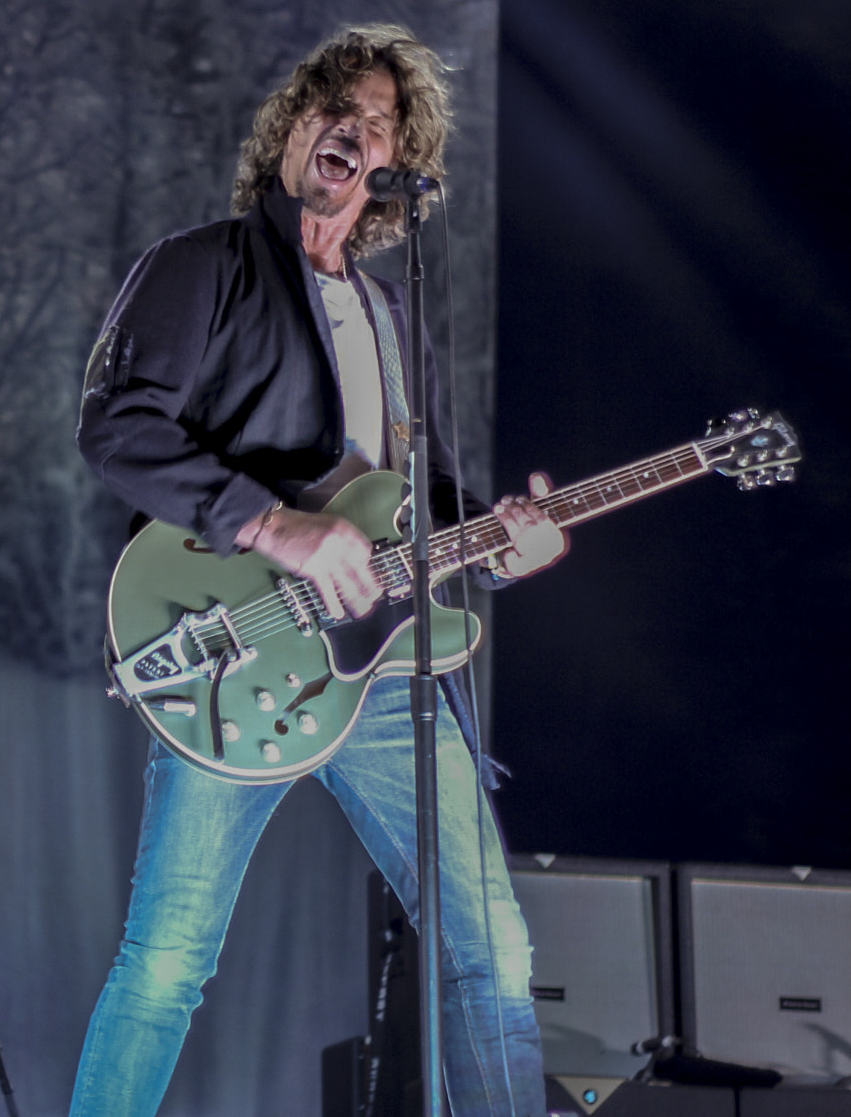
Chris Cornell ES-335

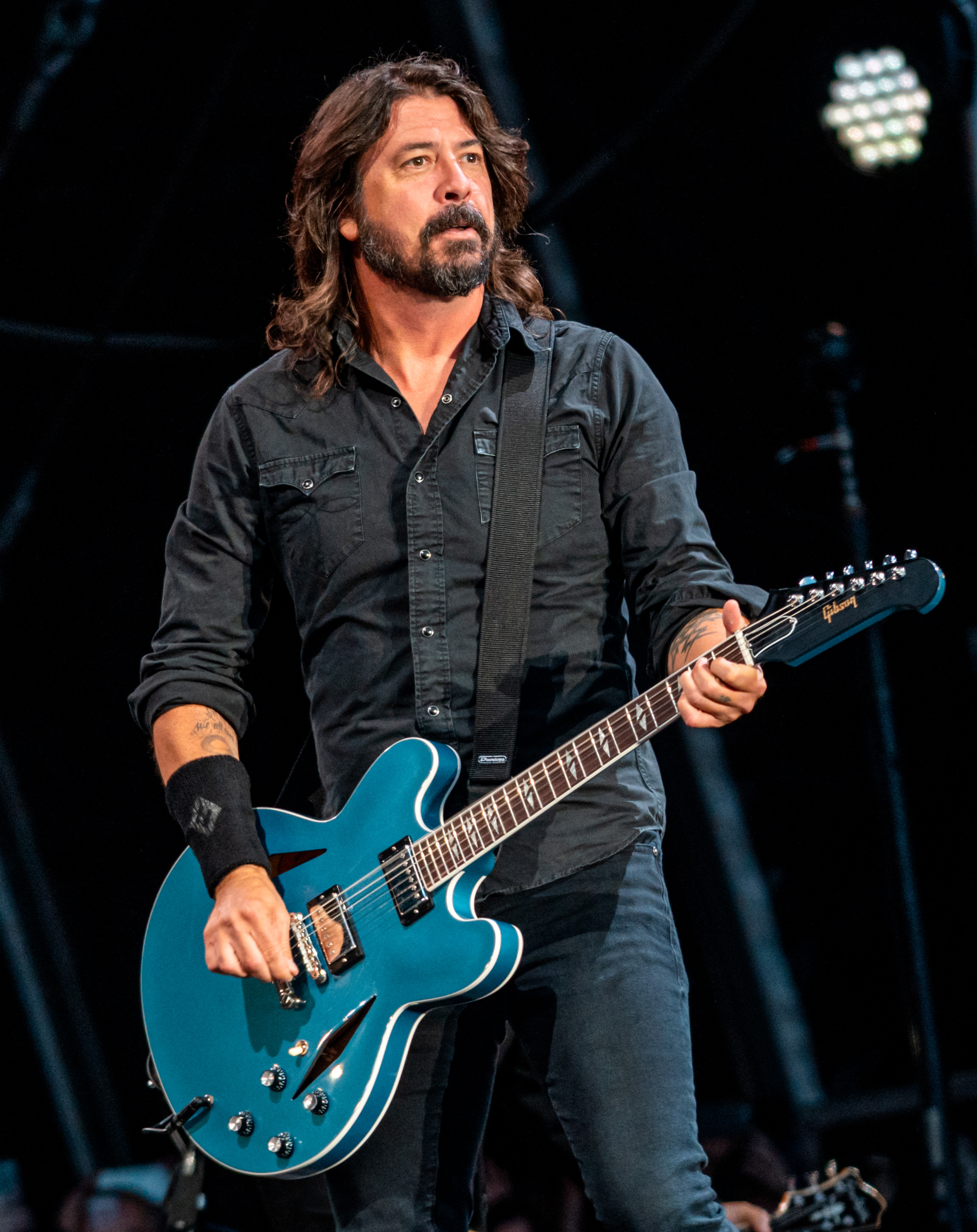
Dave Grohl DG-335

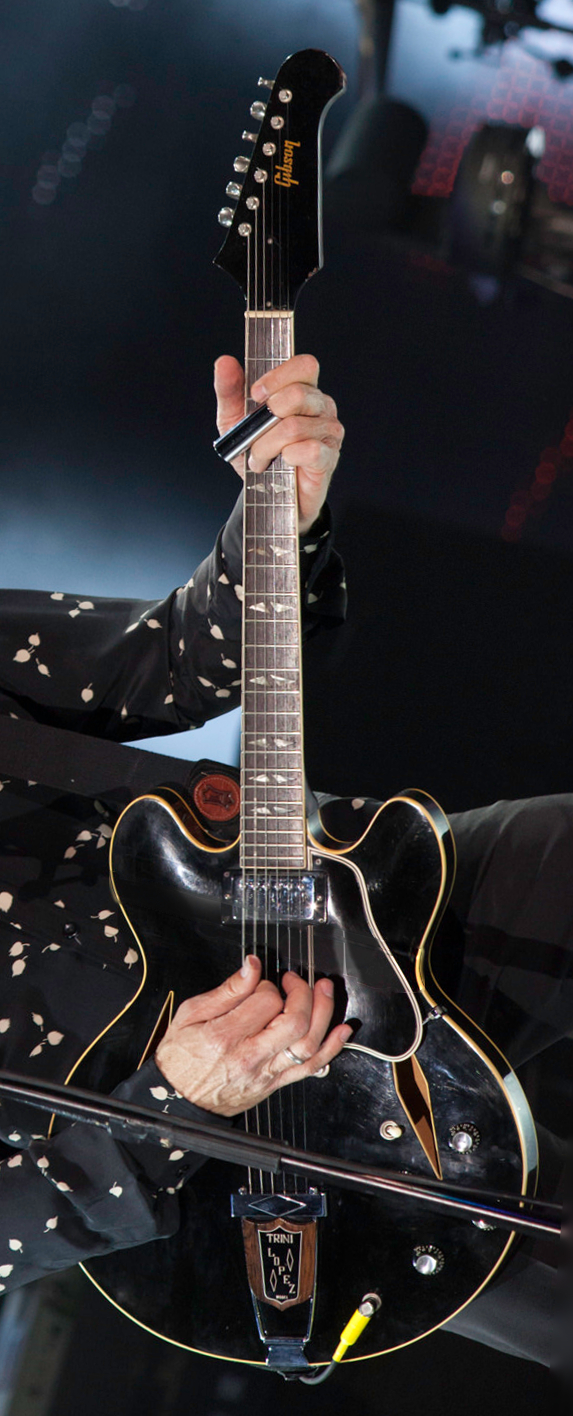
Trini Lopez

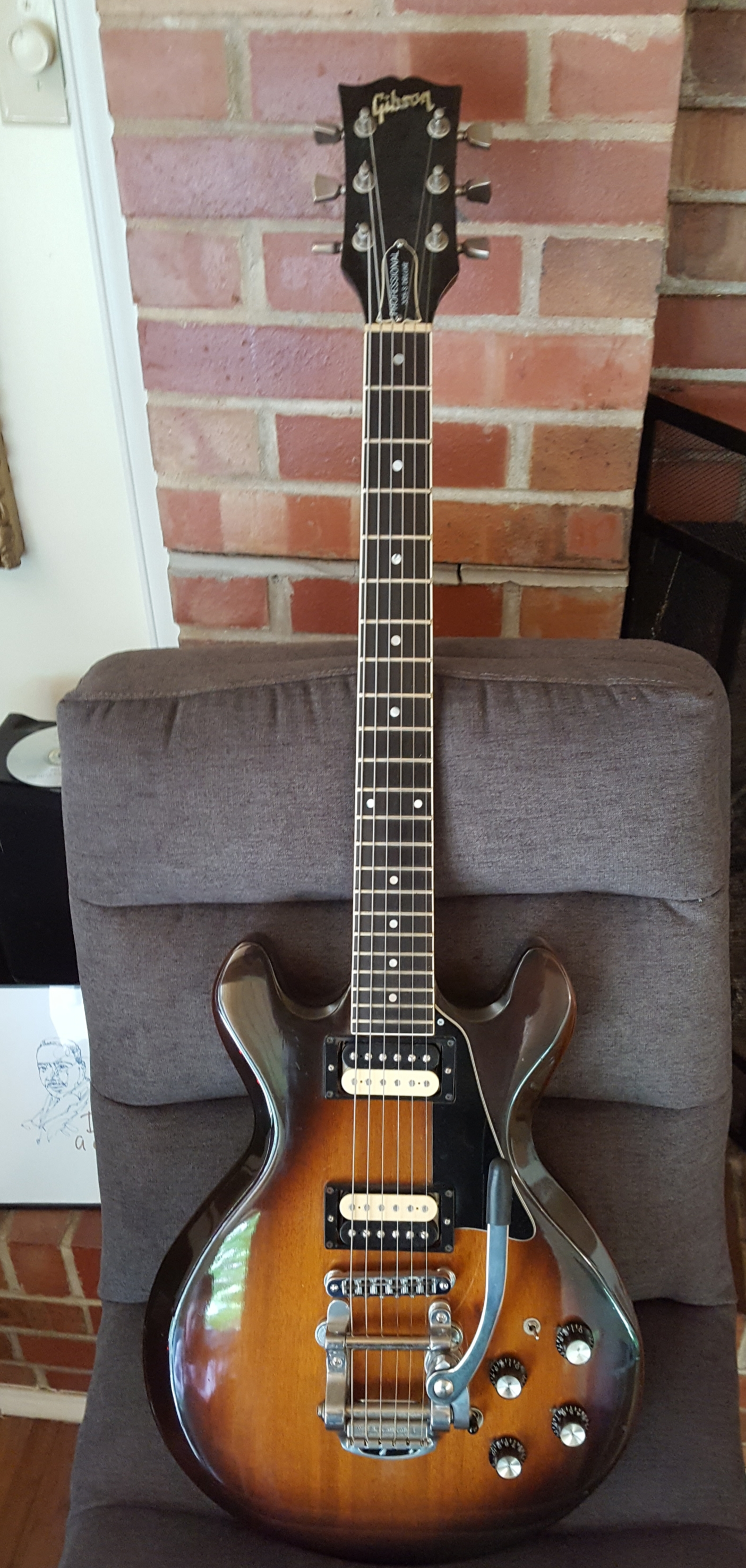
335-S Deluxe

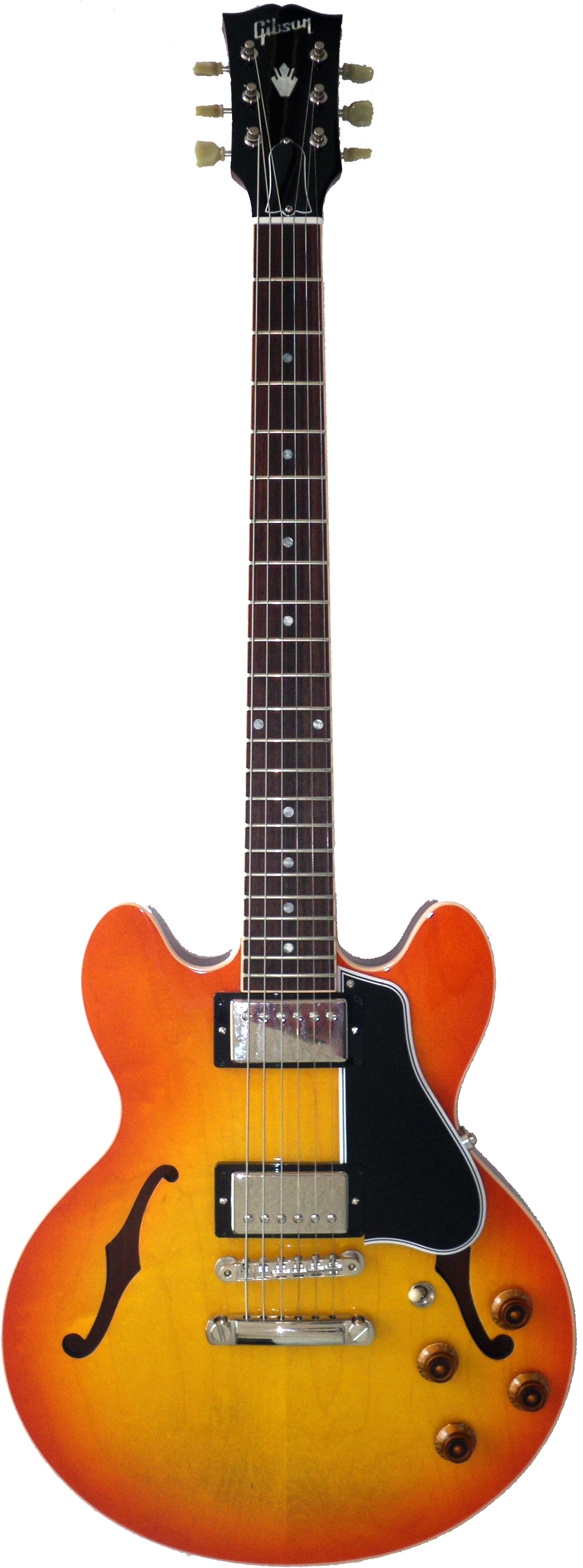
CS-336

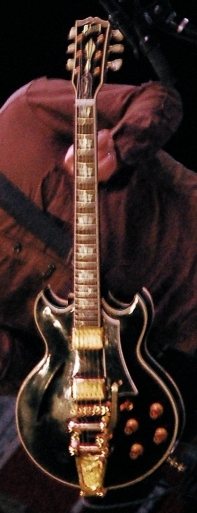
Johnny A

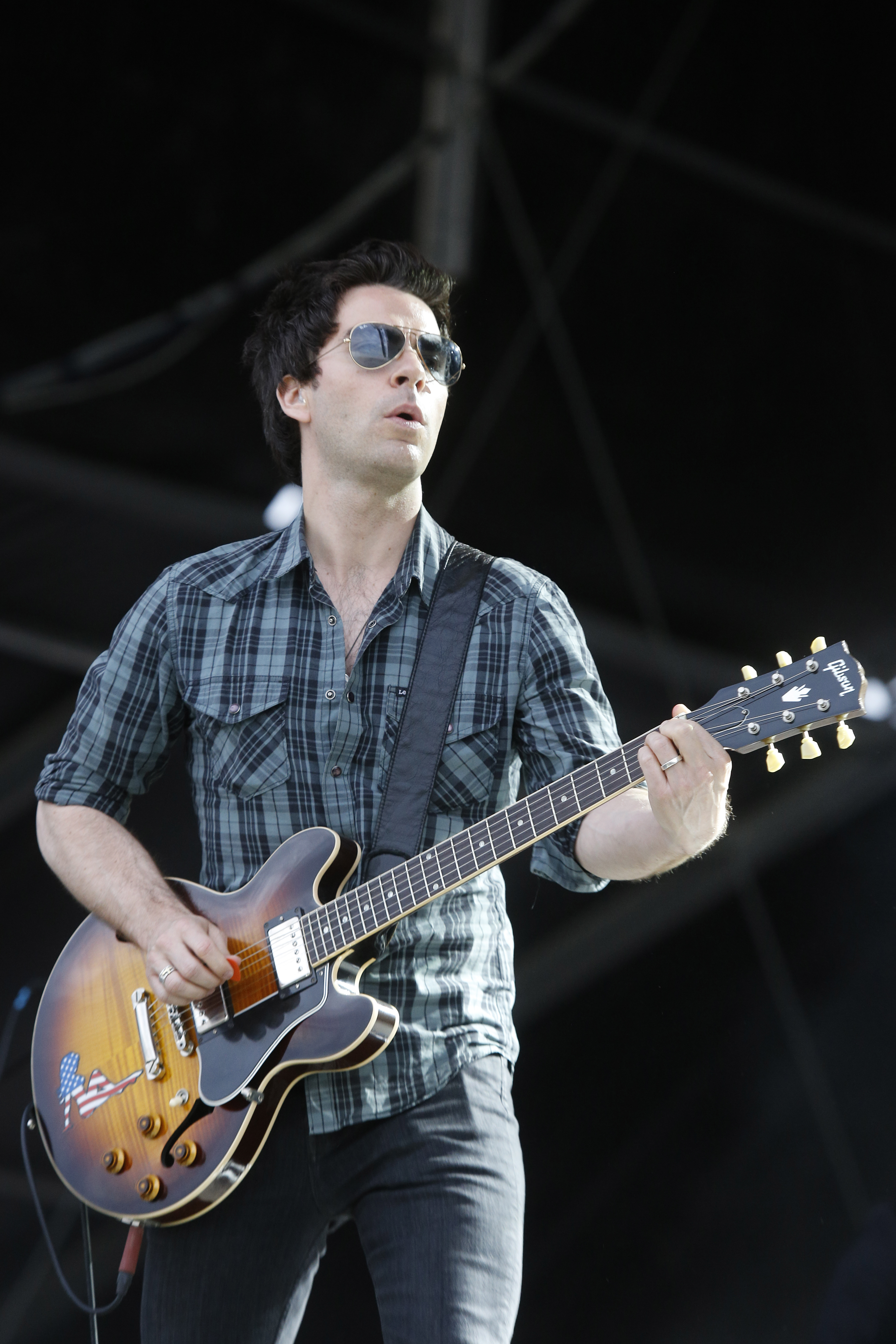
ES-339

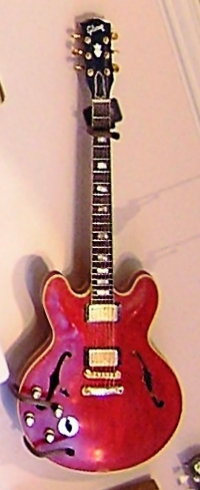
ES-345

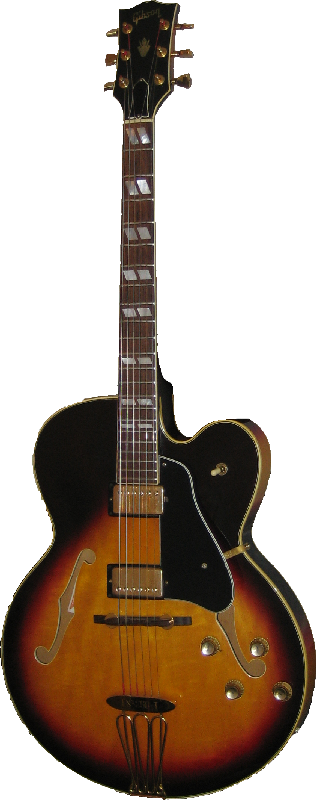
ES-350

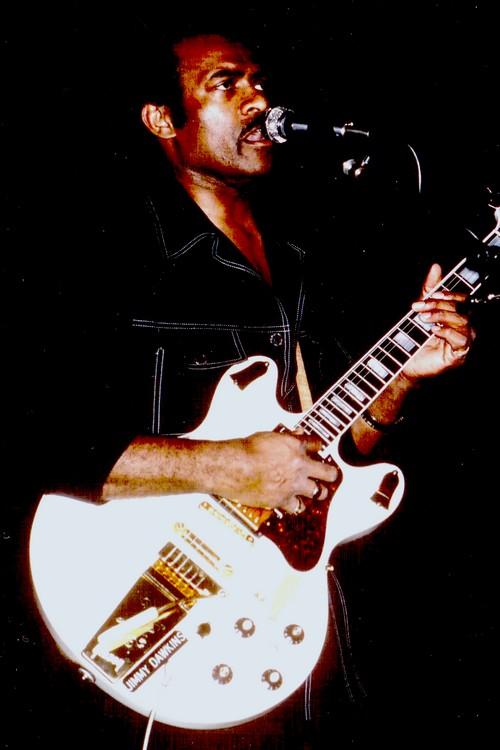
ES-355

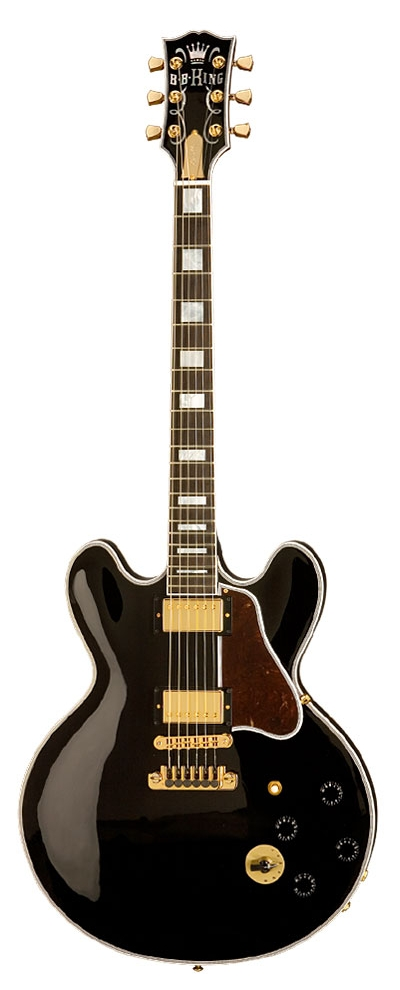
Gibson Lucille

=== Related models ===
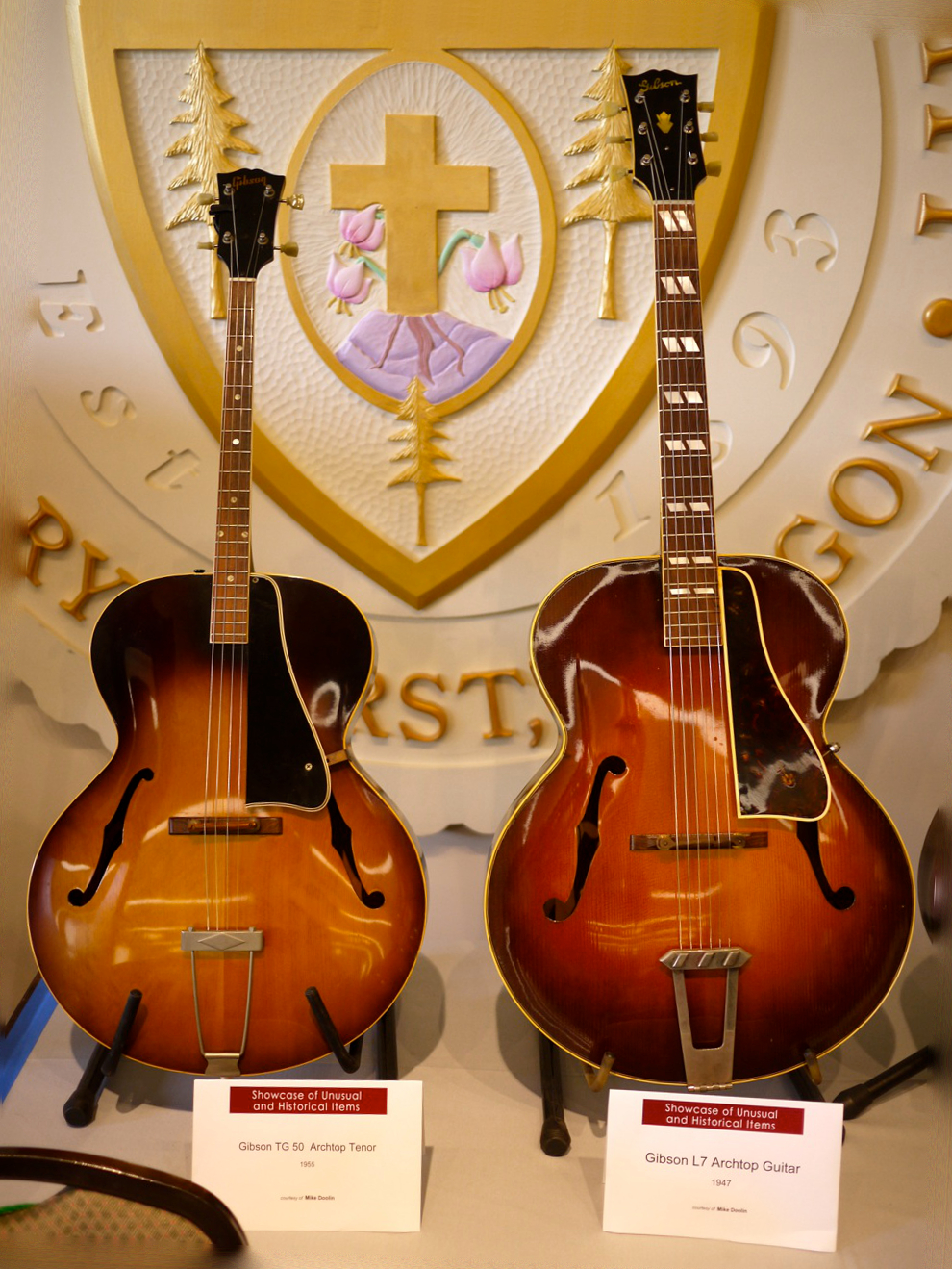
L-50 tenor version (TG-50) with L-7

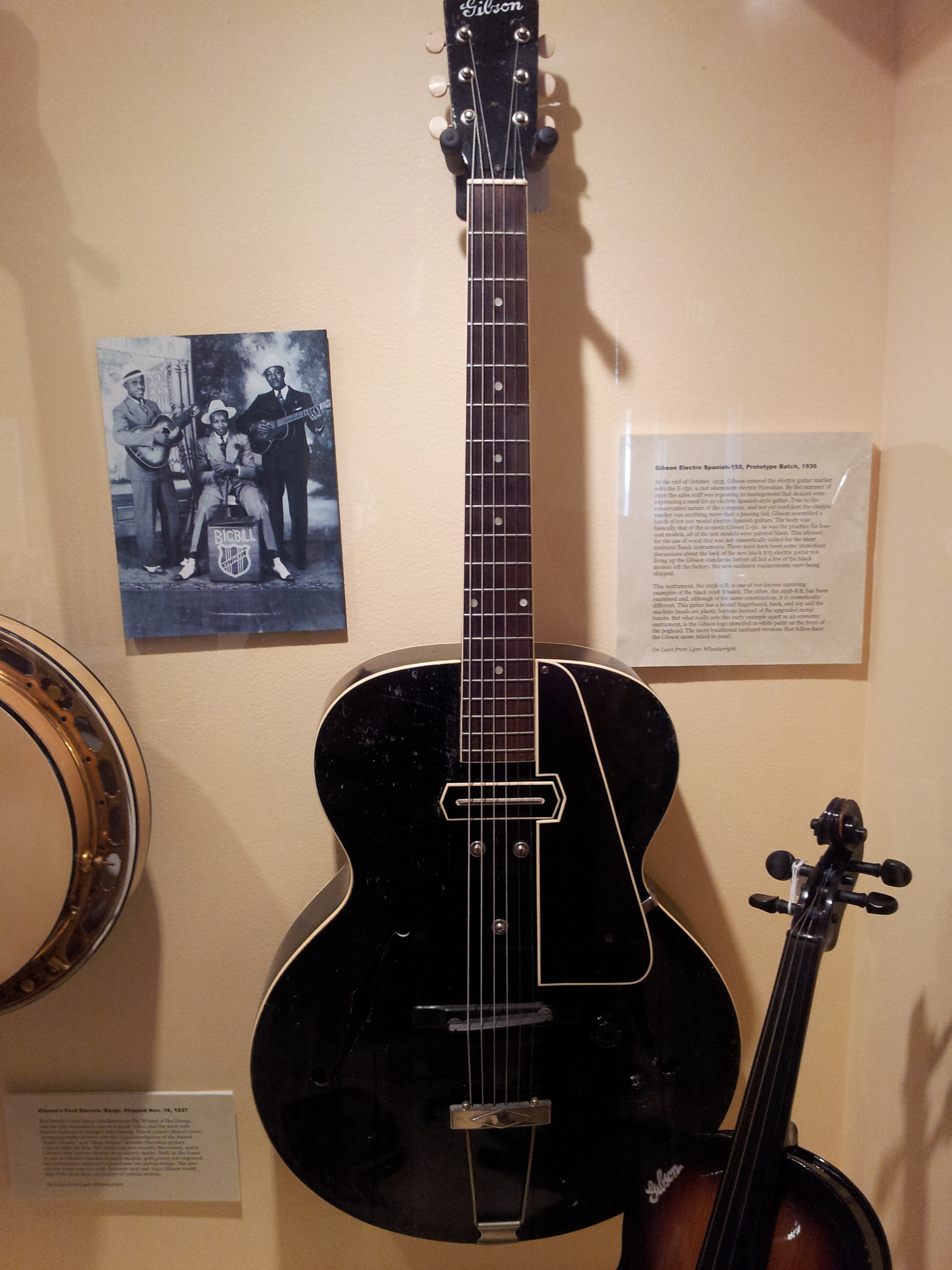
ES-150 proto. (based on L-50)

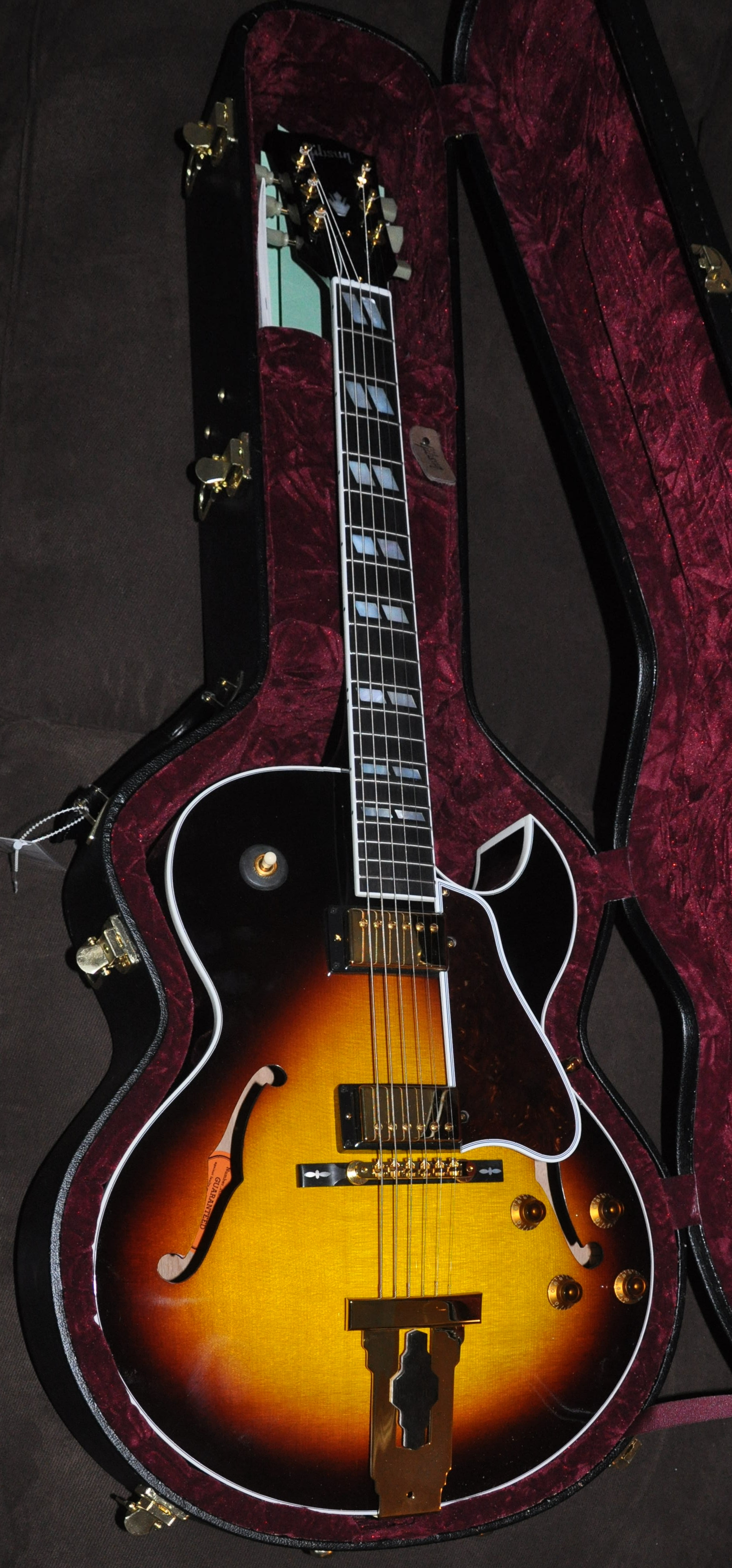
L-4

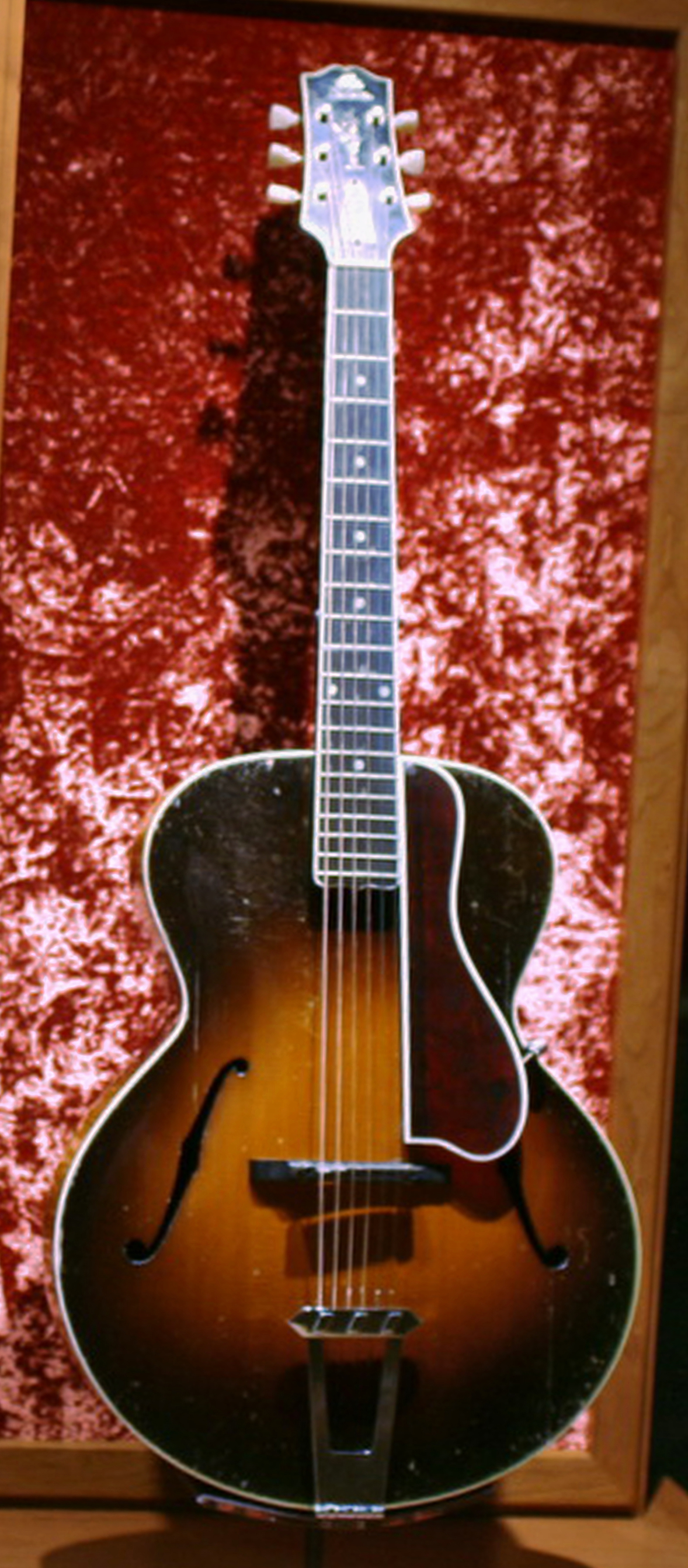
L-5

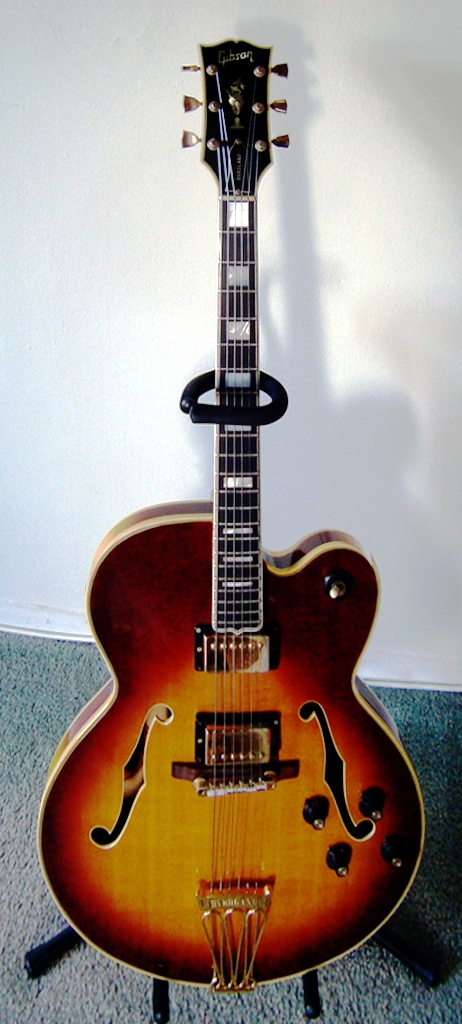
Byrdland

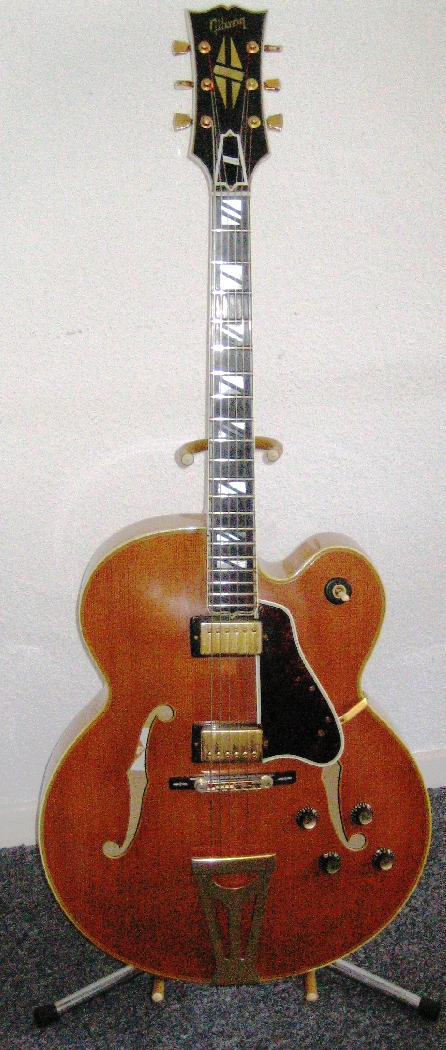
Gibson Super 400

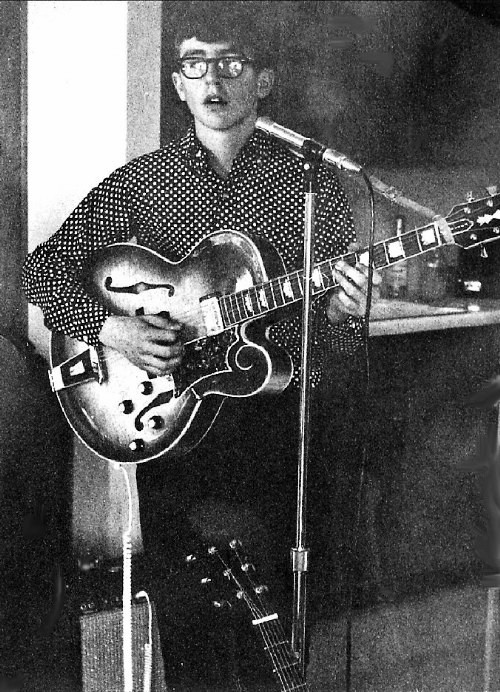
Tal Farlow

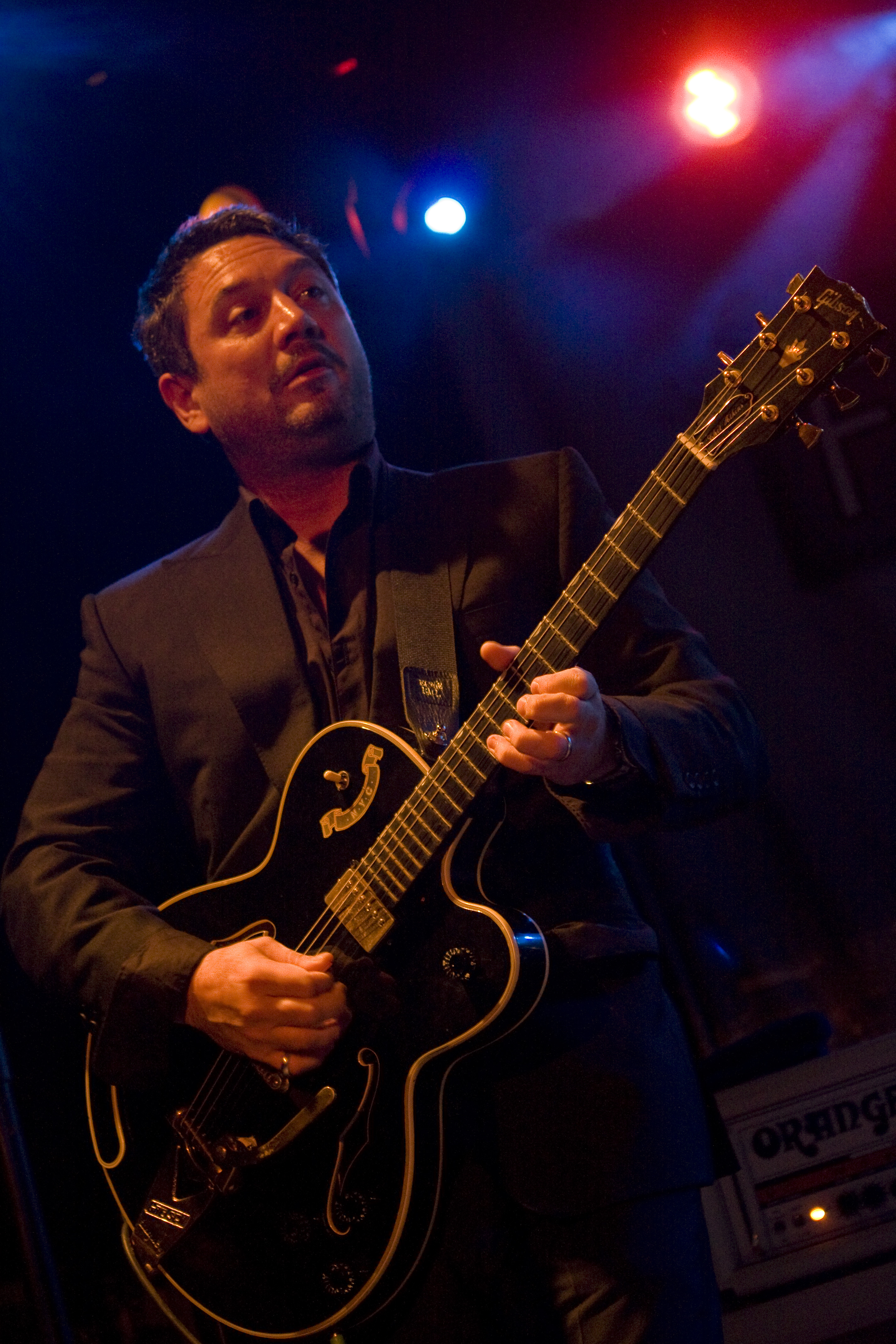
Chet Atkins Country Gentleman

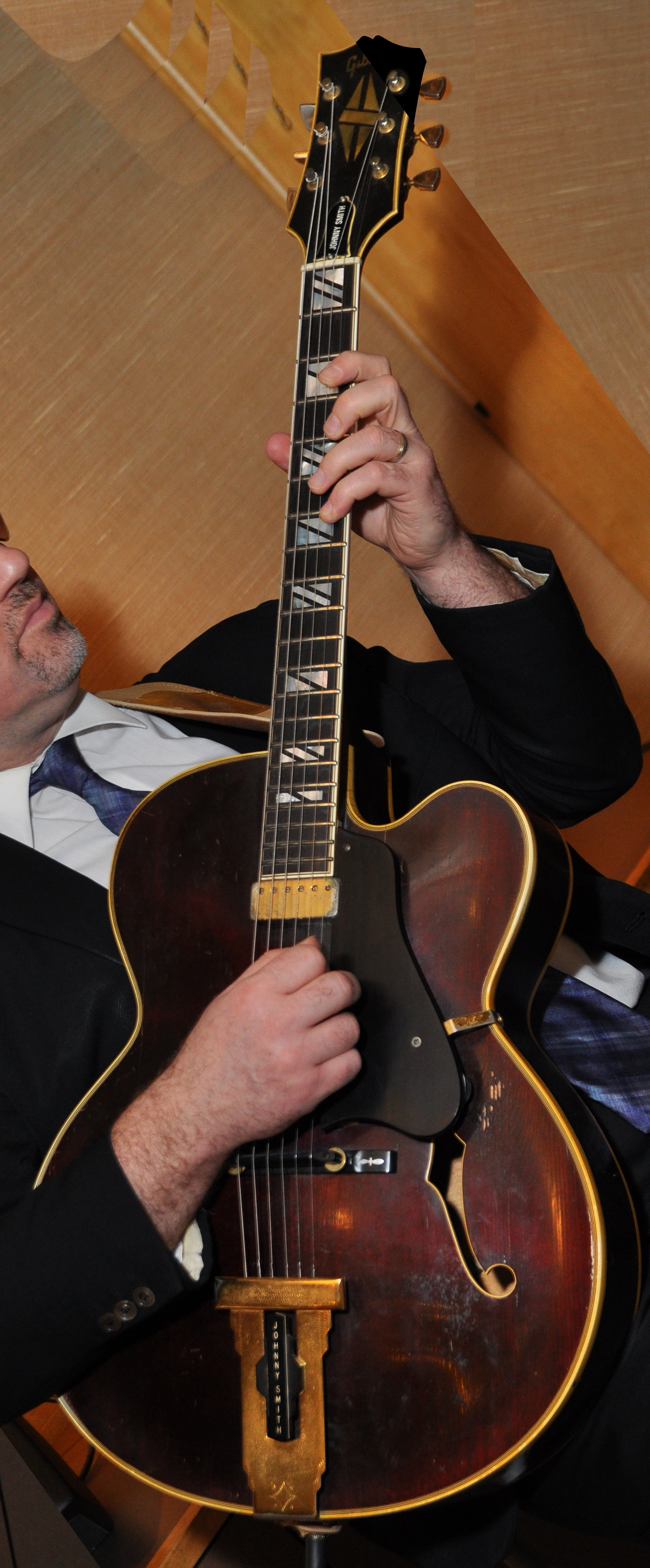
Johnny Smith

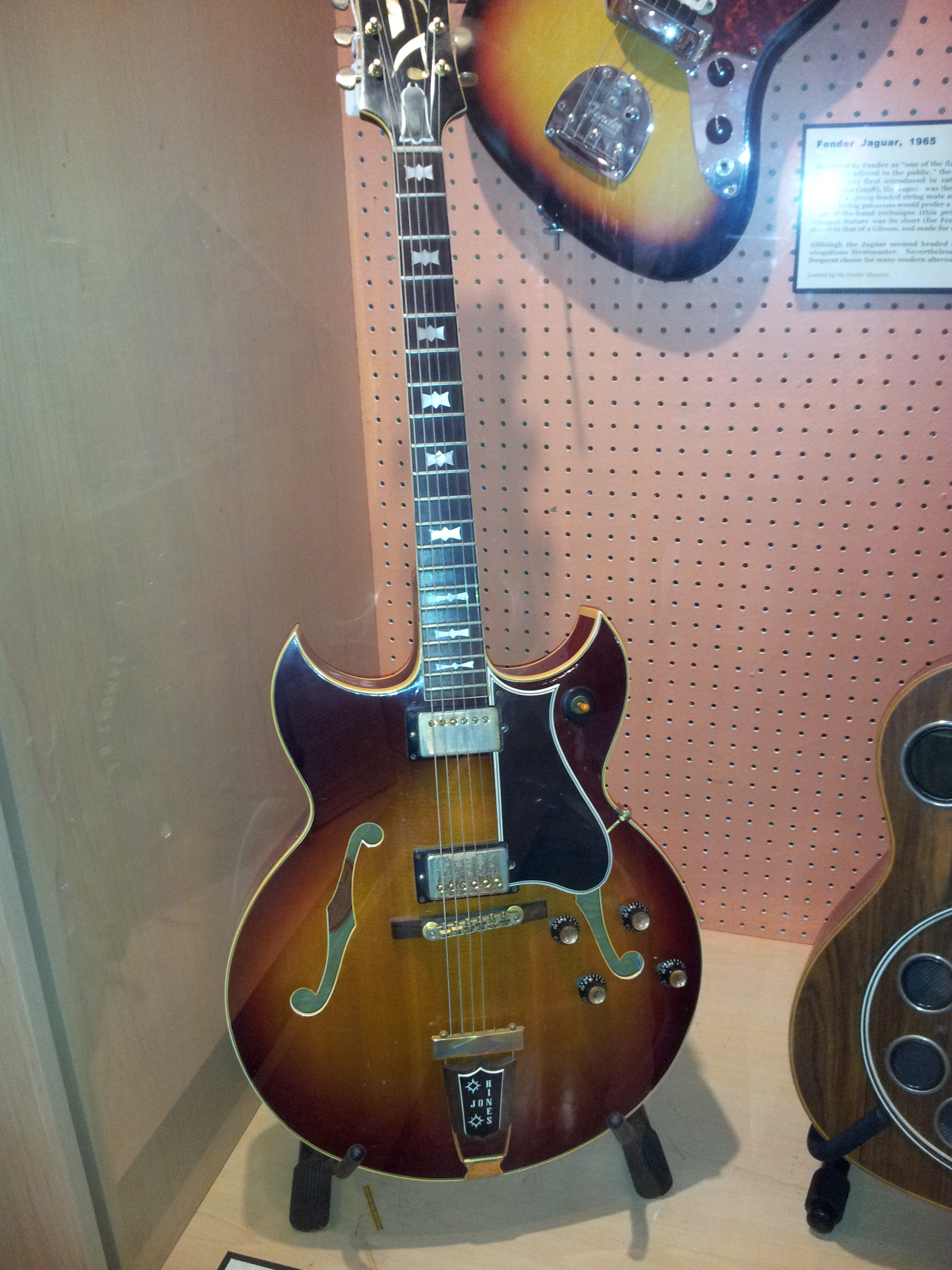
Barney Kessel

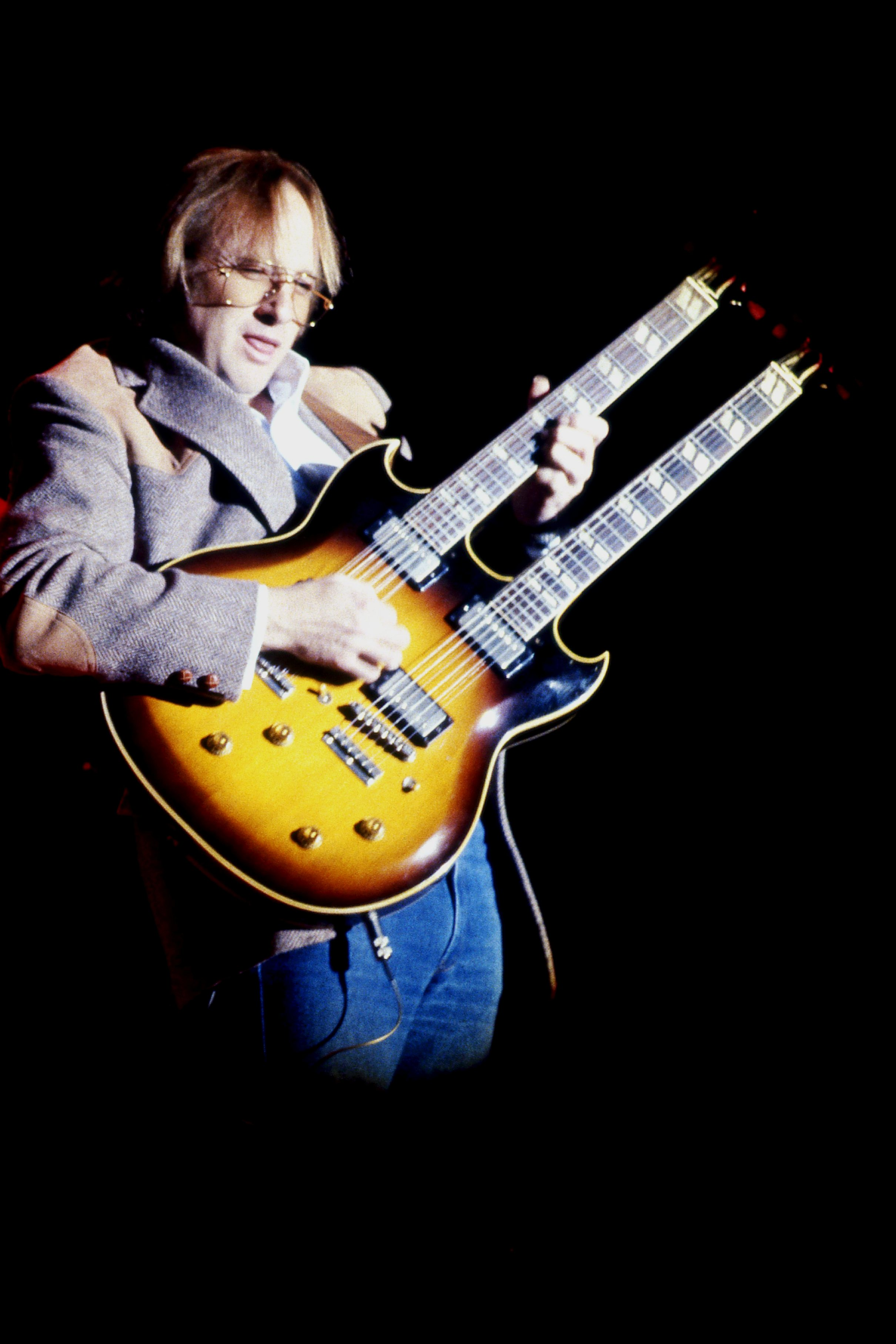
Double-12

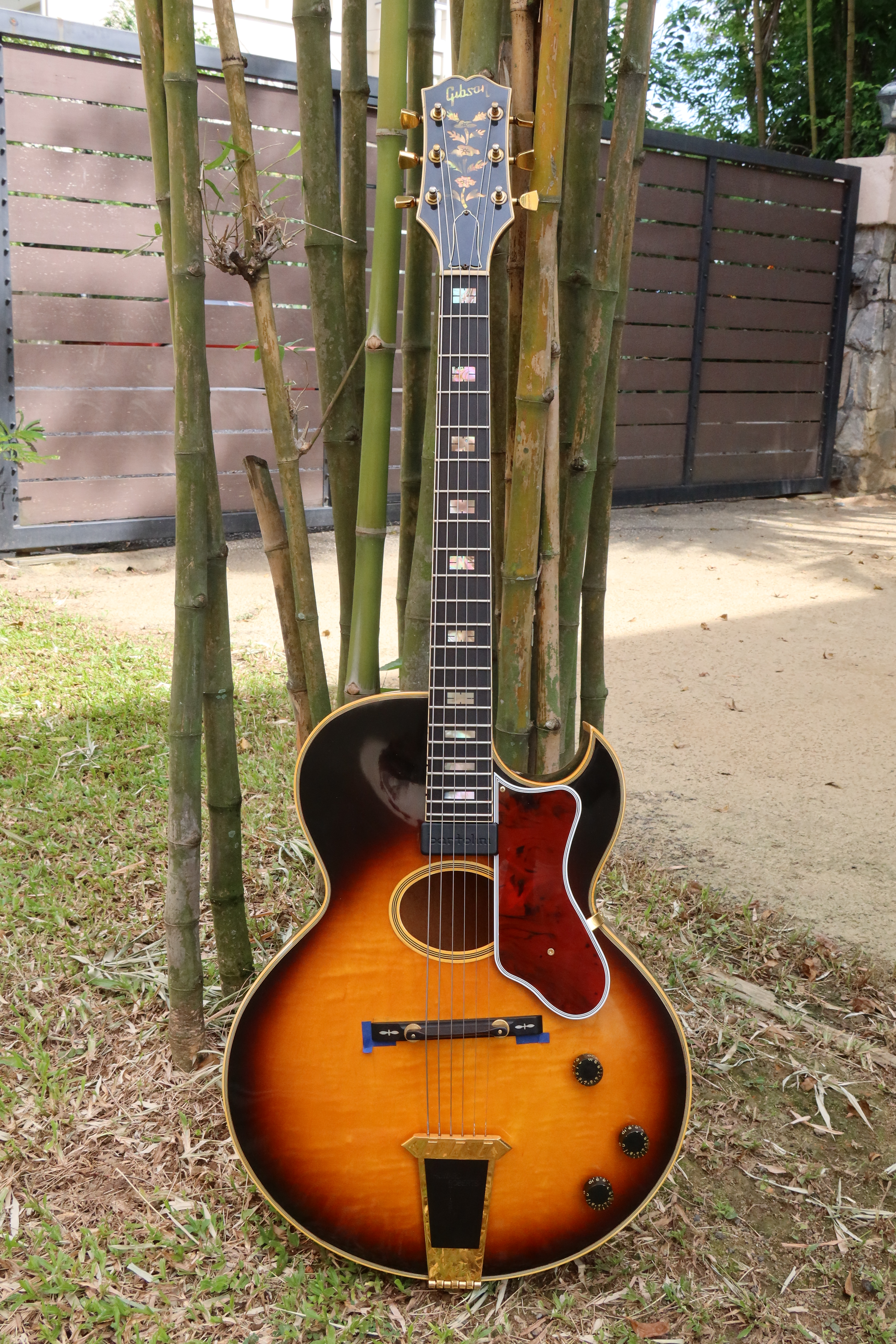
Howard Roberts Artist

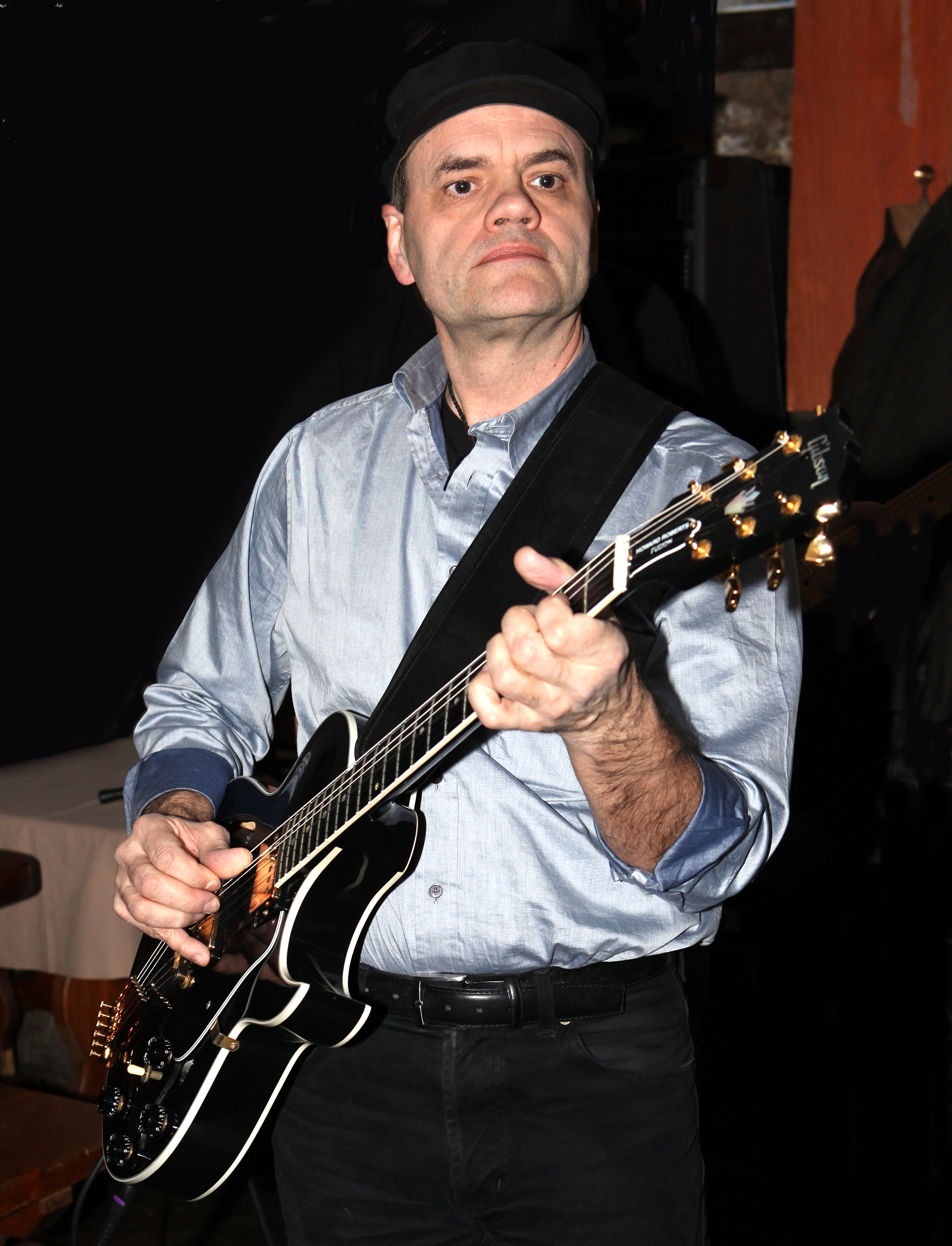
Howard Roberts Fusion

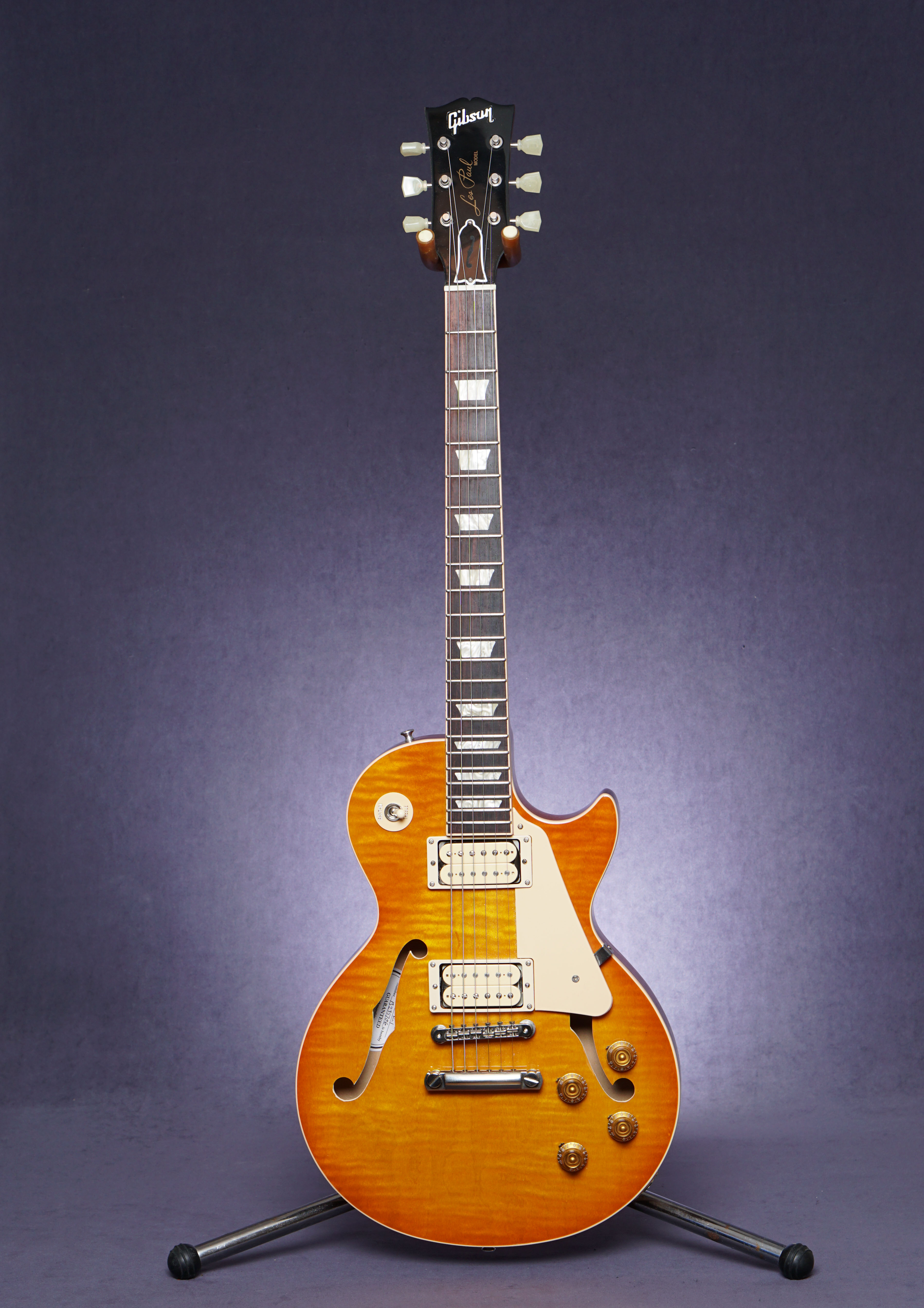
ES-Les Paul

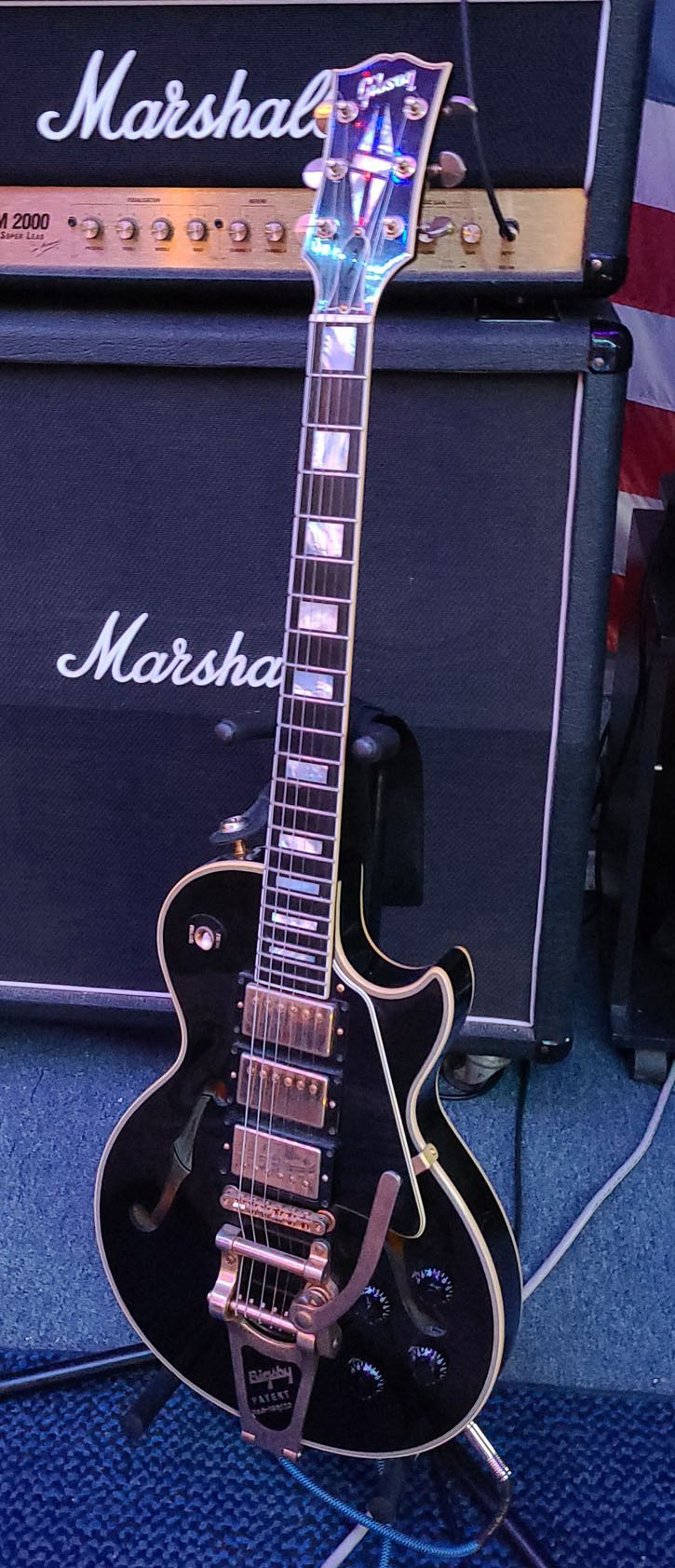
ES-Les Paul Black Beauty

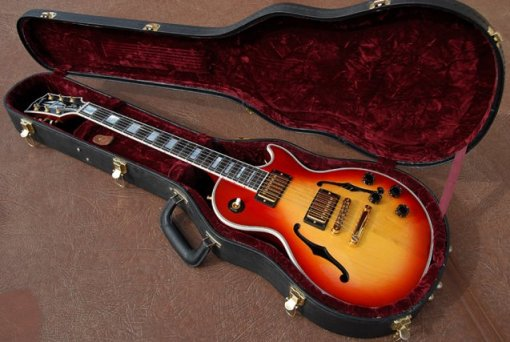
Les Paul Florentine

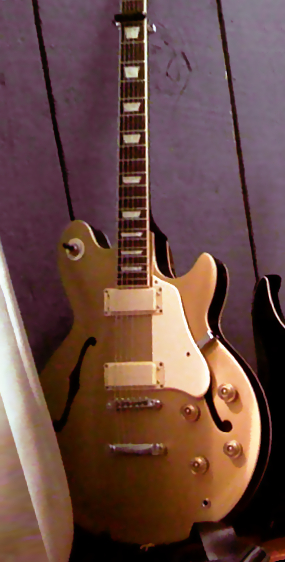
Les Paul Signature

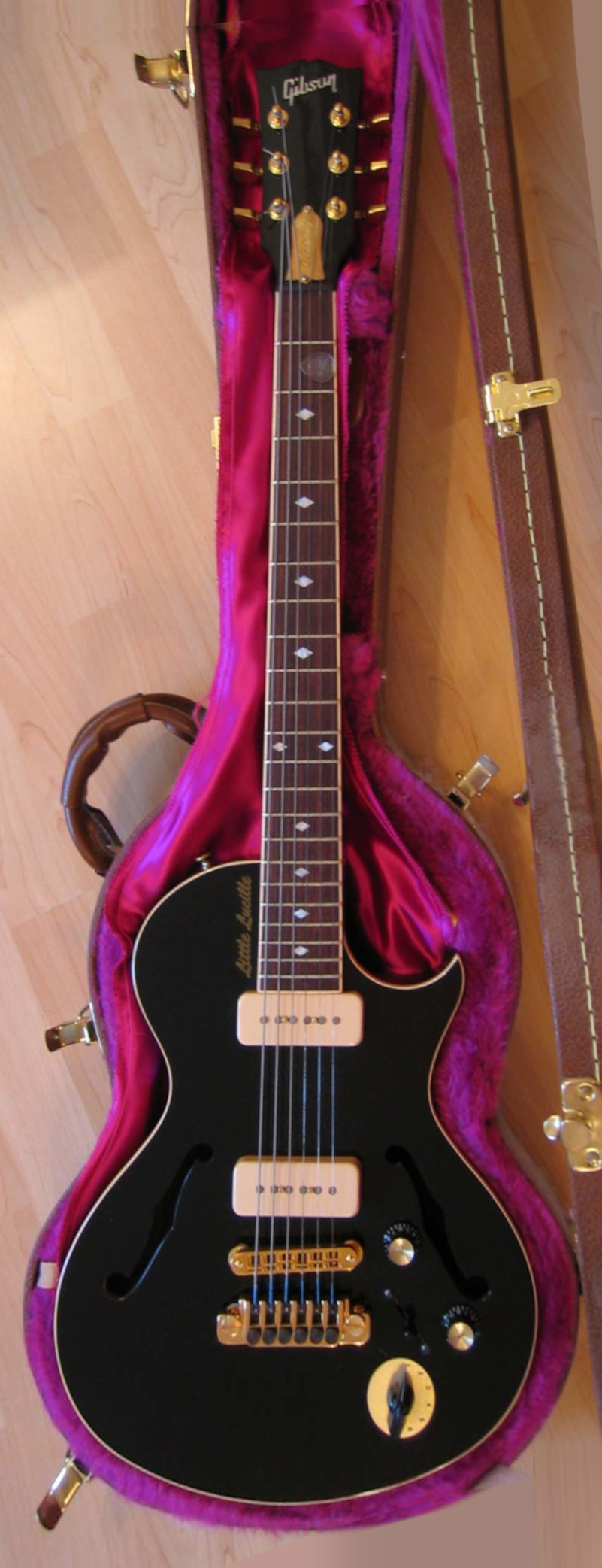
Little Lucille

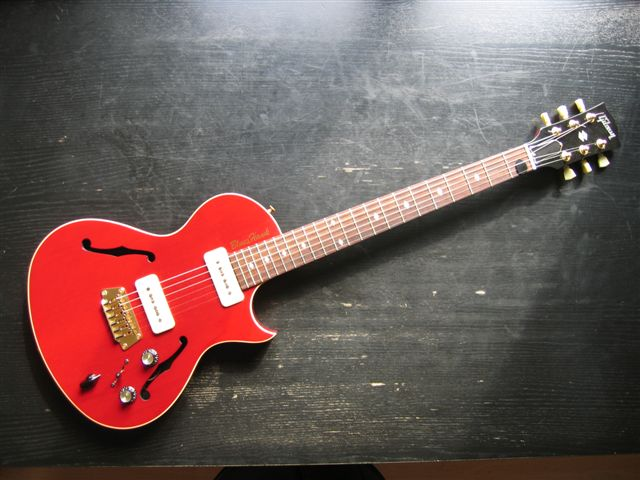
Blueshawk

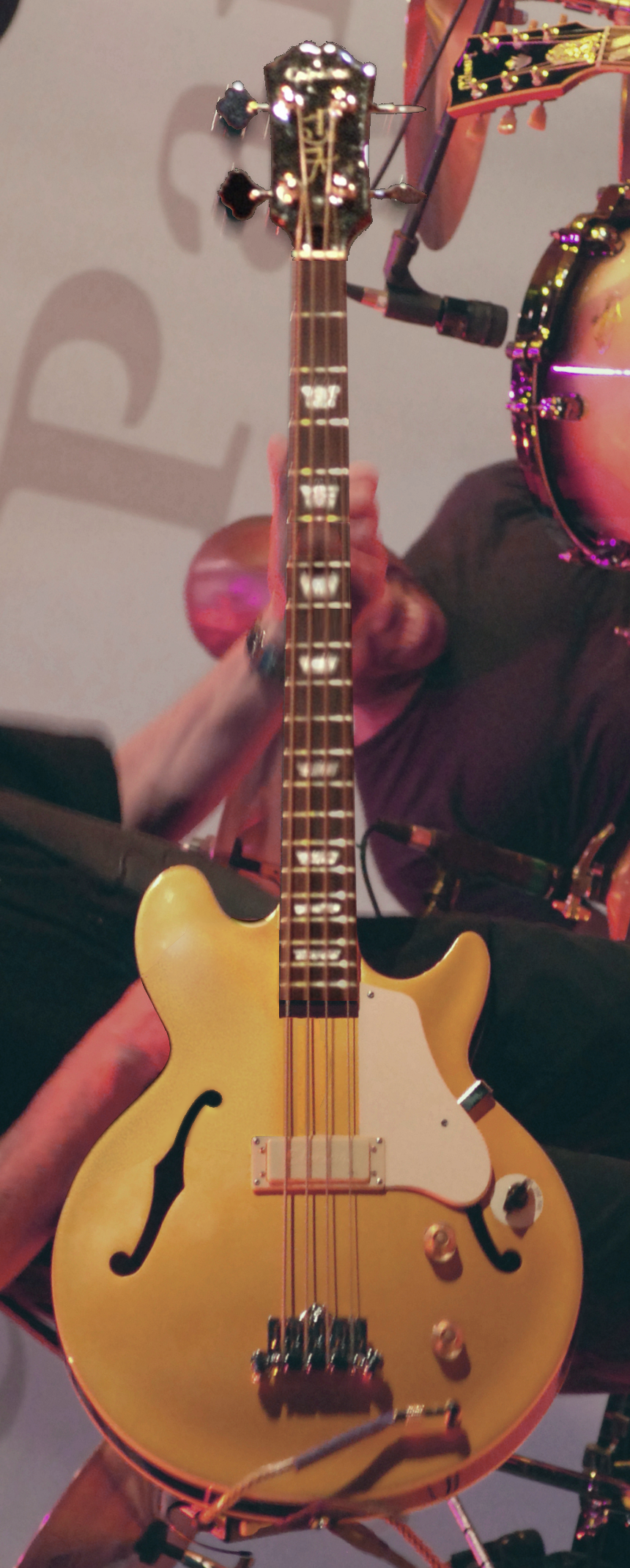
Les Paul Signature Bass

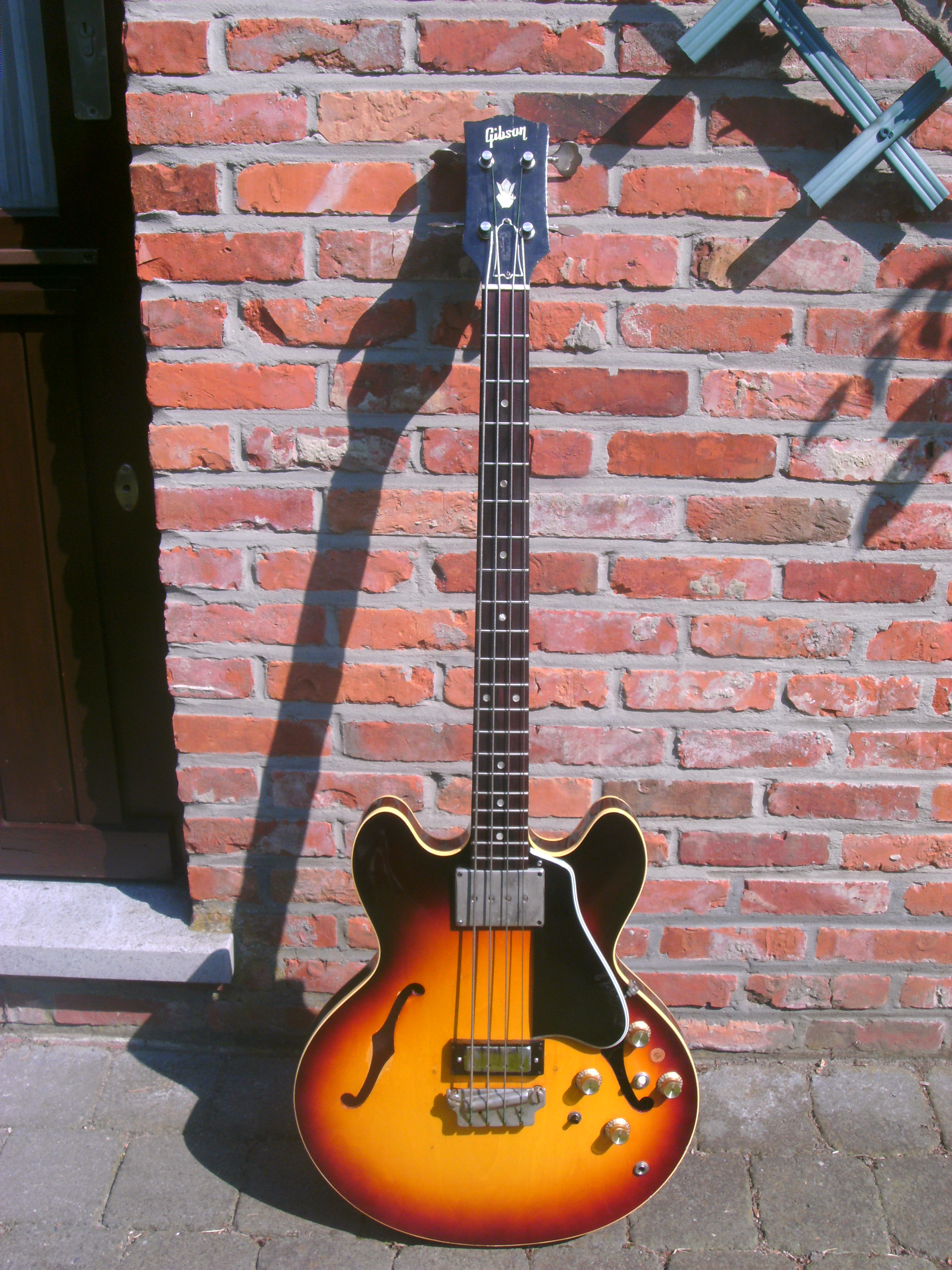
Gibson EB-2

== Tree chart ==
origins /1930s	L-50; ES-150; ES-100 (ver.2) | ES-125 (postwar); ES-130; ES-135 | ES-125T; ES-120T; ES-150DC; ES-135; ES-137 L-4 | Les Paul | L-5; ES-175 | ES-5; ES-140 3/4 | ES-295; ES-5 SM; ES-140 3/4T; ES-175T | Les Paul Signature; ES-165 | ES-775; Les Paul Florentine; ES-Les Paul L-5 CES | (The Log); ES-250; ES-300; ES-350; Byrdland | ES-350T | ES-225T; ES-330TD | ES-335 | ES-345 | ES-355; Trini Lopez; ES-340TD; ES-320; ES-325; ES-347; CRS/CRR | ES Artist | Lucille; Dot | Pro; ES-369; ES-336; ES-333 | CS-336 | CS-356; Tom DeLonge | ES-339 | ES-359	origins /1930s
1940s		1940s
1950s		1950s
1960s		1960s
1970s		1970s
1980s		1980s
1990s		1990s
2000s		2000s
2010s		2010s
2020s		2020s
