= List of products manufactured by Gibson Guitar Corporation =

This is a list of Gibson brand of stringed musical instruments, mainly guitars, manufactured by Gibson, alphabetically by category then alphabetically by product (lowest numbers first). The list excludes other Gibson brands such as Epiphone.

== Guitars ==
=== Acoustic guitars ===
- 1930 Gibson Marshall Special
- Advanced Jumbo
- B series
- Chet Atkins SST
- Hummingbird
- Dove
- Gospel
- J Series
  - J-160E
  - J-45
  - J-180
  - J 200
- Gibson L Series
  - L-00
  - Gibson L-1
  - Gibson L-4
- Gibson MK Series (Mark)
- Southern Jumbo

=== Electric guitars ===
==== Hollowbody and semi-hollowbody guitars ====
- B. B. King Lucille
- Byrdland
- Citation
- CS Series
  - CS-336
- ES Series
  - ES-5
  - ES-125
  - ES-135
  - ES-137
  - ES-140
  - ES-150
  - ES-165
  - ES-175
  - ES-225
  - ES-295
  - ES-325
  - ES-330
  - ES-333
  - ES-335
  - ES-339
  - ES-345
  - ES-350T
  - ES-355
  - ES-359
- L-4
- L-5
- Super 400

==== Solid-body guitars ====
- 335-S
- Blueshawk
- Chet Atkins CEC (Cutaway Electric Classical)
- Corvus
- Challenger
- EDS-1275
- Explorer
- Firebird
- Flying V
- Futura
- GK-55
- L-5S
- L-6S
- Les Paul
  - Custom
  - Doublecut
  - Junior
  - Special
  - Studio
    - Gothic
    - Swamp Ash
    - Voodoo
  - The Paul
- Little Lucille
- Marauder
- Melody Maker
- Moderne
- Nighthawk
- RD
- Robot Guitar
- S-1
- SG
  - Special
  - Junior
- Sonex
- Spirit

=== Bass guitars ===
- EB-0
- EB-1
- EB-2
- EB-3
- G3
- Grabber
- Les Paul
- Ripper
- Thunderbird
- Victory

== Amplifiers ==
- Gibson Falcon

== Mandolin family ==
=== Acoustic ===
- F-5

== Other equipment ==
- P-90
- PAF

== See also ==
- Gibson Brands
