= Gibson L Series =

Acoustic guitar by Gibson

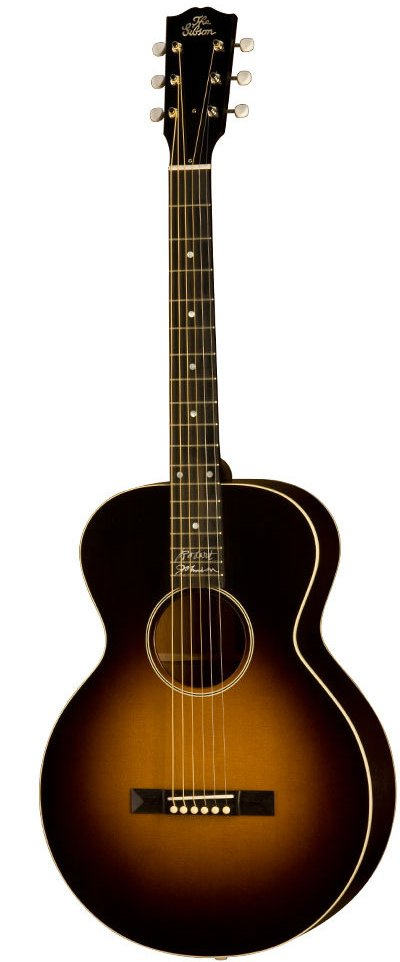
- A Reissued Robert Johnson L-1 Guitar
- Manufacturer: Gibson
- Period: 1902–25, 1926–37, 1991–95, ?–present

Construction
- Body type: Hollow

Woods
- Body: Mahogany
- Neck: Mahogany

Colors available
- Sunburst

The Gibson L series is a series of small-body guitars produced and sold by Gibson Guitar Corporation in the early 20th century. The first guitars of this series, Gibson L-0 and Gibson L-1, were introduced first as arch-tops (1902), and later as flat tops in 1926. The L series was later gradually replaced by the LG series in the 1940s.

These guitars have a relatively smaller body than the Dreadnoughts and Jumbos that appeared later in history. They could generally be categorized into the Grand Concert body size, comparable, or even identical to Martin's 00-style guitars.

== History ==
=== The L Series Flattop ===
Gibson L Series Flattop
- Manufacturer: Gibson
- Period: 1926–1945

Construction
- Body type: Grand Concert
- Neck joint: Dovetail

Woods
- Body: Sitka Spruce or Mahogany top Mahogany, Maple or Birch back and sides
- Neck: Mostly Mahogany
- Fretboard: Mostly Rosewood

Hardware
- Bridge: Mostly Rosewood

Colors available
- Natural, Sunburst

The L series flattop guitars first appeared in 1926. with spruce top and, in the beginning of their production, employed either X, H, or A bracing patterns. The L-1 models have carved maple or birch back and sides, while the less-expensive L-0 models have strained birch back and sides. Both have 12 frets clear of body, 25 in (640 mm) scale length. Later models may have mahogany back and sides, or even mahogany tops. The L-1 model was discontinued in 1937. L-0 was discontinued in 1933, re-introduced in 1937, and finally discontinued in 1942.

Before 1929, L-1, L-0 are 13 1/2 in (340 mm) wide with a round bottom shape. Later the body shape was widened to 14 3/4 in (370 mm) with a more squarish bottom, quite analogous to Martin's 00-style guitars. After 1932, they have 14 frets clear of body instead of 12 frets.

In 1932, the least-expensive L-00 model was introduced. It is the simplified version of L-0, with its back unbound (however they became bound since 1937). Discontinued in 1945.

The L-2 model introduced in 1929 has a slightly different body shape comparing to L-1, L-0 and L-00, which is more of a Nick Lucas shape. It was the most expensive one among the L series. The L-2 model has 12, 13 or 14 frets clear of body. Discontinued in 1935.

Another variant named L-C (L-Century) was introduced in 1933. This guitar is designed for the Century of Progress International Exhibition hosted in Chicago. It featured celluloid plastic ("pearloid", or "mother-of-toilet-seat") covered fretboard, because back in those days this material was considered modern. Discontinued in 1941.

==== L-00 3/4 ====
In 1937, a few 3/4 scale variants of L-00 were also produced.

==== Related HG models ====
Gibson also made HG-0, HG-00 and HG-C during 1937 to 1942, which were practically Hawaiian variants of the corresponding L models.

==== Nick Lucas ====
The Nick Lucas model was first introduced in 1927, as the first artist endorsed Gibson guitar, and a high-end, deep-body version of L-1 (about 4 1/2 to 4 3/8 in (110 to 110 mm) deep). The design changed a lot during the years of its production, until its discontinuation in 1941.

==== L-20 ====
In 1993, Gibson made a special variant of L-00 or Nick Lucas model, namely L-20 Special. This model has rosewood back and sides, with transducer pickup. Discontinued in 1994.

There is also a L-20 Koa International Special model, with Koa back and sides, being made in the same period.

=== The LG series ===
Gibson LG and B Series Flattop
- Manufacturer: Gibson
- Period: 1942–1977

Construction
- Body type: Grand Concert
- Neck joint: Dovetail

Woods
- Body: Sitka Spruce or Mahogany top Mahogany back and sides
- Neck: Mahogany
- Fretboard: Rosewood

Hardware
- Bridge: Rosewood

Colors available
- Natural, Sunburst, Cherry Sunburst

The LG series were introduced in 1942, with a starting line-up of LG-1, LG-2 and LG-3. However, LG-1 and LG-3 stopped production almost immediately after their debut, until they were re-introduced in 1945. In 1958, LG-0 was also introduced as the low-end model of the series. All these models are 14 1/8 in (360 mm) wide, with mahogany back and sides (except for some World War II models have maple back and sides). ladder bracing except the '42-'43 LG1, while LG-2 and LG-3 are spruce with X-bracing. LG-0 and LG-1 discontinued in 1974, LG-2 and LG-3 were replaced by B-25 and B-25N in 1962.

The LG series are narrower in the lower bout comparing to the L series, but have a much wider upper bout.

In 1949 Gibson produced a run of the Hawaiian variant, HG-2. A 12-string variant, LG-12, was also made in 1967-1973.

==== The B series ====
LG-2 and LG-3 were re-introduced as B-25 and B-25N respectively in 1962. B-25 has cherry sunburst finish, while B-25N has natural finish. Late models of B-25 and B-25N have adjustable saddles equipped, just like many other '60s Gibson acoustic guitars. Both discontinued in 1977.

The 12-string version, B-25-12, was also made in the same period

There were also two lower end models, B-20 and B-15. B-15 was produced during 1967-1970. It was listed as a "student model" by Gibson, with spruce top and laminated mahogany back and side. B-20 was produced during 1970–1971, with solid mahogany back and top.

It's worth mentioning that there is also a model B-45-12 in the B series, which is actually a full-size round-shoulder dreadnought, like the J-45, and only in 12-string version.

==== LG-2 3/4 and B-25 3/4 ====
In 1949, a 3/4 scale variant of LG-2 was produced. After being replaced by B-25, B-25 3/4 was also produced.

A few 3/4 scale variant of LG-1 was also produced.

==== Tenor models ====
Tenor variants of LG and B-25 were also made: TG-0 from 1960 to 1974, and TG-25 from 1960 to 1970.

==== CF-100 ====
During 1950 to 1959, a model named CF-100, along with its electric version CF-100E, was produced, which were practically cutaway LG-2 models. The electric version has a P-90 pickup.

== Reissued models ==
After their discontinuation, several reissue and limited version was produced, including:

=== Regular models ===
- A number of L-00 models are currently in production, including the Standard, Studio, Deluxe and Sustainable.
- L-00 Vintage, featuring a vintage look with "thermally cured" Adirondack Red Spruce top. Still in production.
- LG-2 American Eagle, a reissue of the vintage LG-2, with modern hardware and pickup. Still in production.

=== Limited models ===
- 1950 CF-100E, a 1994 Centennial model reissuing the 1950 CF-100 model, with a P-90 pickup
- L-1 custom maple: in February 1993 Gibson produced series of 31 guitars made with maple back, sides and 3-piece maple neck. Most guitars are sunburst but few are natural color.
- Icon '60s Series: in 2008, Gibson launched a series reissuing several vintage models in the 1960s. Although never appeared in its official website or media press, a limited run of the B-25 and B-25 3/4 models were also produced.
- 20th Anniversary L-20 Limited, a 2009 limited model reissuing the L-20 model, to celebrate the 20th anniversary of guitars being made in Gibson Montana
- Robert Johnson L-1, a limited model reissuing the 1926 L-1 model
- Elvis Costello Limited, a 2013 limited model reissuing the LG-C model
- LG-2 Americana, a 2013 limited model originally built for Patty Griffin, with Adirondack Red Spruce top
- 1932 L-00, a 2014 custom shop model reissuing the 1932 L-00, with Adirondack Red Spruce top
- 1928 L-1 Blues Tribute, a 2014 custom shop model reissuing the 1928 L-1 (with a narrower body and round bottom), with Adirondack Red Spruce top
- Keb' Mo' Bluesmaster, a Keb' Mo' signature model reissuing the L-00 model with 12 frets clear of body, with Adirondack Red Spruce top
- Arlo Guthrie LG-2 3/4, an Arlo Guthrie signature model reissuing the LG-2 3/4 model
- L-00 Acacia Special, a 2016 limited model with acacia back and sides
- Nick Lucas Grande, a 2016 limited model reissuing a late Nick Lucas model
- Harlem Slim model, a 2002 limited model of Gibson L1 made in Bozeman, Montana and released by Fuller's Vintage Guitars. This reissue had two Gibson L1 models: aged and distressed 1926 L1 and the 1929 model reissue. Fifty model L-1 guitars were issued; ten were aged and distressed.

=== Special runs ===
- L-00 Pro: a Guitar Center exclusive reissuing the vintage L-00 model

== Notable players ==
- Arlo Guthrie uses a 3/4 sized LG-2. Gibson currently produces an Arlo Guthrie Signature model.
- Robert Johnson was photographed with a L-1 acoustic. Gibson makes a Robert Johnson Signature model.
- Woody Guthrie used an L-0.
- Jeff Buckley used an L-1.
- Sheryl Crow uses a L-00 Blues King.
- Elvis Costello used a LG-C.
- Patty Griffin used a LG-2. Gibson makes a LG-2 Americana as a replica.
- Chris Stapleton uses a mid 1950s LG-2 with the batwing pickguard, and references the LG-0 in his 2015 song, "Outlaw State of Mind."
- Derek Trucks uses a 1934 L-00.
- Julian Lage uses a 1932 L-0 on his album "Speak to Me."
