= Under Graph =

Japanese rock music group

Under Graph is a Japanese band that was formed in 1997.

== Member profiles ==
- Vocals/Guitar: Naoto Matohara (真戸原 直人, Matohara Naoto)
  - Birthdate: July 27, 1977
  - Equipment:
    - Gibson ES-325
    - Fender customshop '69stratocaster Black
    - Shinos Luck6V amp
- Guitar/background vocal : Ryosuke Asa (阿佐 亮介, Asa Ryōsuke)
  - Birthdate: February 6, 1978
  - Equipment:
    - Gibson Les Paul Standard
    - Fender tone master amp
- Bass/background vocal : Kazuma Nakahara (中原 一真, Nakahara Kazuma)
  - Birthdate: August 5, 1977
  - Equipment:
    - Fender Precision Bass 1969
    - Fender Precision Bass 1977
    - SVT-3PRO(HEAD)
    - SVT-810E (Cabinet) Ampeg
- Drums/background vocal/vocals : Naoko Taniguchi (谷口 奈穂子, Taniguchi Naoko)
  - Birthdate: December 6, 1981
  - Equipment:
    - Canopus

== Past Member ==
- Guitar/background vocal : Ryosuke Asa(阿佐 亮介, Asa Ryōsuke)

== History ==
Under Graph started in 1997. They began to play live performances in Kobe; however, they moved their base to Tokyo in 2000. In March 2002, the band began to release their works. Word began to spread and Under Graph appeared as a regular program star on Nack5 radio. In 2004 they released their first major debut single. Since then, they have released additional singles and albums.

== Discography ==
=== Albums ===
- Zero e no Chowa
- Subarashiki Nichijyou
- Kokyuu Suru Jikan (2008)
- Kono basho ni Umareta Bokutachi wa Itsumo Naniga Dekiru ka Wo Kangaeteiru (2009)
- Under Graph (Single Best) (2010)
- Katen gecchi (2011)
- Ao no Toki (2011)

=== Singles ===
- "Hana-bira" (2002)
- "Ke Sera Sera" (2002)
- "Tsubasa" (2004) (ending theme for Season 2 Episode 15 of Mushoku Tensei: Jobless Reincarnation)
- "Kimi no Koe" (2005)
- "Paradym" (2005)
- "Yubisaki Kara Sekai Wo" (2006)
- "Majimesugi ru kimi he" (2006)
- "Mata Kaerukara/Peace Antenna" (2007)
- "Second Fantasy" (2007)
- "Japanese Rock Fighter" (2008)
- "Kokoro no Me" (2009)
- "Natsukage" (2010)
- "Sunzashi"
- "Kaze Wo Yobe" (ending theme for TV anime Yowamushi Pedal) (2013)

=== DVD ===
- "Yubisaki Kara Sekai Wo"
- "Under Graph to Iu band no Eizou"
- "spring tour'08 ～Kokyuu Suru Rakuen～"
- "10th Documentary Films"

=== Digital single ===
- "Too ki Hi"
- "Haruka naru Miti"
- "Kokoro no Me～Anniversary Medley～"
- "Onnaji Kimoti"
- "2111 ～Kako to Mirai de Warau Kodomotati He～"
- "Yappari Tikyuu ha Aokatta"
- "Kozo Kotoshi"
- "Sora he Todoke"
- "Daisanji Seityoki"
