= Ovation UKII =

Electric Guitar

Ovation UKII, or Ultra Kaman II, is a solid body electric guitar produced by Ovation Guitars.

The guitar featured a hollow body aluminum frame encased in a mold of urelite, a dense urethane foam. This made the guitar light, and the hollowness gave it a very distinct sound. The neck of the guitar was glued to the body and then bolted to the frame, so that along with the hollow body this would allow for maximum sustain. The pickups were custom-made by Ovation. Each coil was wound 10,000 times, more than most pickups, resulting in a high amplitude. The pickups also included switches that would switch the wiring in the pickups from in series to parallel, effectively turning hum bucker into a single coil in sound quality on the fly. The guitar also had a mono and a stereo output, where the stereo separated the two pickups into their own channels.

The UKII came in several varieties:

- Chrome or gold hardware (bridge/tuners/etc)
- Several finishes usually painted to look like the grain of wood
- Abalone rectangle inlays or mother of pearl bowties (signature look) on the fretboard which was made of ebony
- An optional pickguard

The number of UKII's produced is not known, but ranges between 2,000 and 3,000, between 1979 and 1983. Like all other ovation solid body guitars of the time, it came with its own serial number and brown hard case. Ovation stopped producing solid bodies in the mid-1980s and the UKII has become a collector's items along with other Ovation solid bodies like the Breadwinner and Ultra GP.

Notable users

Greek guitarist Adonis Mitzelos performing live with the progressive rock band P.L.J. Band at Kyttaro Club in Athens (1982-1983), playing his black Ovation UK II electric guitar during the presentation of the album Armageddon.

Adonis Mitzelos one of Greece's most prominent and acclaimed guitarists and composers, extensively used the Ovation UK II as his primary electric guitar across several landmark recordings.

He initially utilized the instrument during his time with the progressive rock group PLJ Band on their globally acclaimed 1982 album Armageddon (released via Vertigo Records). Subsequently, the guitar became his main instrument from 1983 to 1993 with the influential Greek rock bandTermites, shaping the sound of their entire discography—including the hit song "Poso Se Thelo". Mitzelos also recorded with the Ovation UK II on his album Beyond the Light (recorded between 1994 and 1998 in New York City featuring members of the American jazz-fusion band Spyro Gyra, and released in 2001 by Universal Music).
