= Gibson Everly Brothers Flattop =

Acoustic guitar

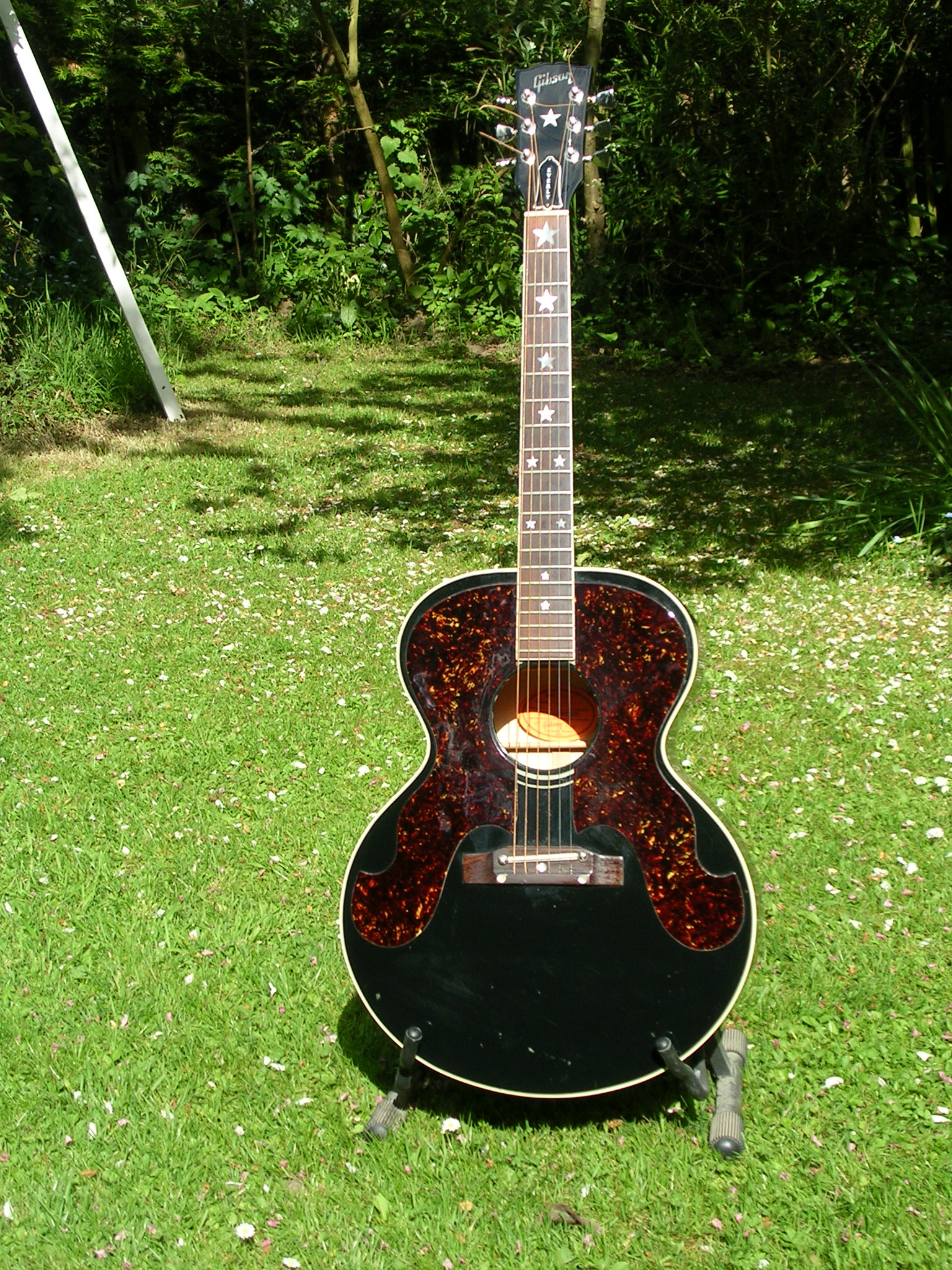
- Gibson Everly Brothers Guitar
- Manufacturer: Gibson
- Period: 1962-1972

Construction
- Body type: Jumbo
- Neck joint: Dovetail

Woods
- Body: Sitka Spruce top Mahogany back and sides
- Neck: Mahogany
- Fretboard: Rosewood

Hardware
- Bridge: Rosewood

Colors available
- Natural, Black, Vintage Sunburst

The Gibson Everly Brothers Flattop is a signature acoustic guitar model produced by the Gibson Guitar Corporation.

The Everly Brothers recorded many hit songs during the 1950s and the 1960s, such as "Wake Up Little Susie", "Let It Be Me", "Cathy's Clown", "All I Have to Do is Dream", and "Bye Bye Love". Throughout the 1950s, they used Gibson J-200 guitars, some customized with dual pickguards.

In 1962, Gibson collaborated with the Everly Brothers to produce the Everly Brothers Flattop. This flat top guitar featured a thin J-185-style body and an adjustable bridge. The guitar was unusual in that it featured star-shaped inlays on the rosewood fretboard, and it had a large double tortoise grain pickguard, which covered most of the top of the body. As the pickguard covered most of the top of the guitar, it limited the vibration of the top, thus limiting the sound of the guitar. The standard finish on the guitar was black, though a few models were natural or sunburst finish. The Everly Brothers Flattop was discontinued in 1972, but was reissued as the Gibson J-180 in the mid-1980s.

The Everly Brothers used these guitars throughout the 1960s, both live and in the recording studio. Paul McCartney also owns and plays an Everly Brothers model, as did many influential artists including George Harrison, Bob Dylan, Cat Stevens, Neil Diamond, Keith Richards, Jimmy Page, Roger Daltrey, Billie Joe Armstrong, Billy Idol, Sharleen Spiteri, Madonna and many more. Albert Lee is the owner of Don Everly's original Everly Brothers Model. Lee was presented with the guitar by Don Everly himself. The guitar that Don gave to Albert Lee is not an 'Everly Brothers Model', but a 1958 SJ-200 finished in black with cream double pickguards.
