= Fender California Series =

Series of electric guitars

Fender California Series (USA)
- Manufacturer: Fender
- Period: 1997–1998

Construction
- Body type: Solid
- Neck joint: Bolt-on

Woods
- Body: Alder
- Neck: Tinted Maple
- Fretboard: Rosewood or Maple

Colors available
- Fiesta Red, Candy Apple Red, Brown Sunburst, Black, Vintage White

Fender California Series electric guitars included both a Stratocaster and Telecaster models produced by Fender in 1997 and 1998. In 1997 Fender described the California Series guitars as "a combined effort by our guitar makers in Corona, California, and Ensenada, Baja California, Mexico. All California series are produced along the Pacific Coast Highway. First the bodies and necks are cut and shaped in Corona. Then, they're sent to Ensenada where they're sanded, painted and buffed. Final assembly is then performed in Corona using genuine Fender hardware and electronics."

== General features ==
=== Fender California Series Stratocaster ===
- Vintage style “C” profile neck with a 9½" radius.
- 21 medium jumbo frets.
- Vintage tremolo, tuners and 4 bolt neck plate made on same machines as 1950s Fender guitars
- 3 Ply WBW pickguard.
- 25½" scale length.

=== Fender California Series Telecaster ===
- Vintage "C" profile maple neck
- 21 medium jumbo frets
- Solid Alder body
- U.S. vintage hardware
- 3 Ply WBW pickguard
- 25½" scale length
- Two pickup configurations were available:
  - Two single coil model featured Tex-Mex Strat pickup in the neck position and a Tex-Mex Tele bridge pickup
  - "Fat" Telecaster featured a Tex-Mex neck position humbucker and Tex-Mex Tele bridge pickup

== Technical Information ==
The Fender California Series Stratocaster guitars have USA vintage style tremolos and tuners and other hardware.The tremolo bridge spacing is the same as the Fender USA vintage bridge spacing of 2 3/16". The Fender California Series Stratocaster bodies are routed for a single neck/single middle/bridge humbucking pickup configuration and have a polyurethane paint finish. The pickup configuration could also be routed for a single neck/ single middle/single bridge. They do not have the infamous "swimming pool" rout. The single coil pickups used on this Stratocaster model are Fender pickups, in the usual 3-single coil arrangement, or the 2-single coil and 1-humbucker in the bridge position ("Fat Strat") arrangement.

The California Series Telecaster model also features vintage hardware such as Kluson-style tuners and a vintage bridge with six individual steel saddles. Medium jumbo frets make string bending and playability by far easier in contrast to the usual thin vintage frets. All Telecaster bodies of this particular series were routed for a humbucker pickup in the neck position. There were two options of the pickup configuration: Either a "Fat Tele" pickup arrangement with a Fender USA humbucker neck pickup and a bridge pickup or a Stratocaster single coil pickup in the neck position combined with a single coil bridge pickup. The serial numbers are in an AMXN + 6 digits format while the first digit represents the year of production. AMXN7***** means the guitar was manufactured in 1997.

All Fender California Series have "Made in USA" on the headstock.
