= Imitation pearl =

Manmade objects resembling pearls

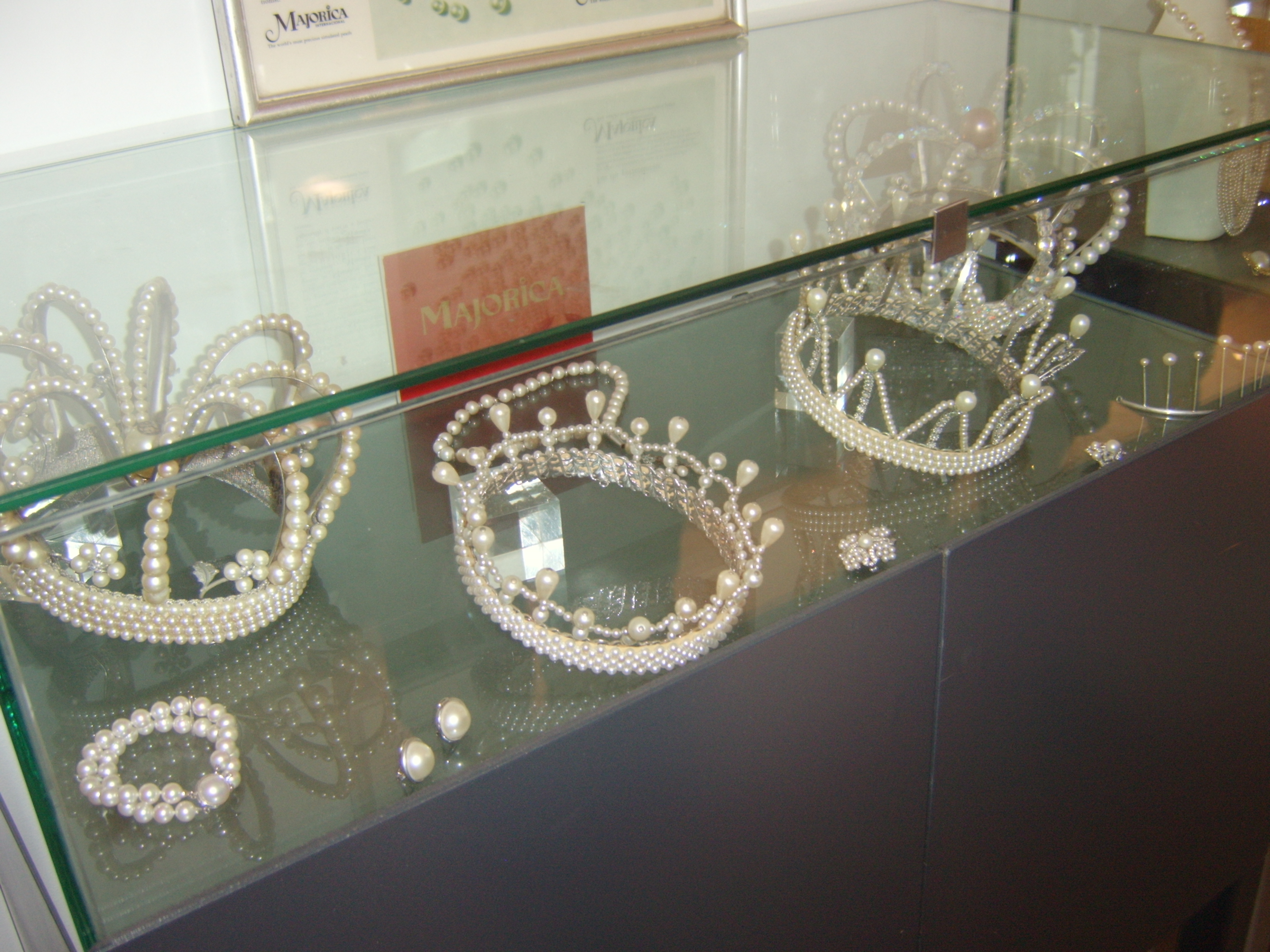
Items made from Majorica pearls, a version of imitation pearl

Imitation pearls are man-made faux pearls. They are not to be confused with cultured pearls, which are real pearls created through human intervention.

Materials used to create imitation pearls include glass, plastic, and mollusc shells. As an alternative, some plastic beads are coated with a pearlescent substance to imitate the natural iridescence of nacre or mother of pearl.

== Types ==
- Bathed pearl (also called Angel, Sheba, Mikomo, Kobe, Nikko, Sumo, Fijii, Aloha, or "improved cultured pearl") is a mother-of-pearl core coated with a mixture of plastic enamel, lead carbonate, mica, and titanium dioxide, then with a film of iridescent nylon.
- Bohemian pearl is a cut and buffed mother-of-pearl protuberance.
- Cotton pearl (also called "Utter Ethical pearl") is made merely from cotton and mica.
- Glass pearl is a glass bead dipped or sprayed with pearlescent material, or hollow glass bead filled with pearlescent material. One variation is the Majorica pearl. Wax-filled pearl simulants are hollow glass beads coated with essence d'orient and filled with wax. Variations of these wax-filled simulants, which are produced in slightly different manners, include Parisian pearls, Paris pearls, French pearls, Bourguignon pearls, and Venetian pearls.
- Mother-of-pearl pearl is crushed nacreous shell powder, sintered into the desired shape. See also shell pearl (1) below.
- Plastic pearl has plastic core coated with a pearlescent material.
- Roman pearl is an alabaster core coated with a pearlescent material.
- Shell pearl
  - Cut, buffed, and sometimes dyed nacreous portions of mollusk shells: Variations and alternate names include cat's-eye pearl, coque de perle (from nautilus shells), mother-of-pearl pearl (from mother-of-pearl), and hinge pearl (from the hinge of bivalve shells).
  - Spherical shell core coated with pearlescent material

The pearlescent substance used to coat various cores may contain essence d'orient, isinglass, fish scales, oyster scales, or mother-of-pearl powder, along with binders or dyes.

Coral is sometimes used to imitate pearls from the pink conch, and hematite is sometimes used to imitate black pearls.

== See also ==
- Cultured pearl
- Pearloid
