= Gibson GK-55 =

The Gibson GK-55 is an electric guitar formerly manufactured by The Gibson Guitar Corporation.

== Description ==
The GK-55 is a stripped-down model based on the 1955 Gibson Les Paul, before the company began to produce the Les Paul Studio. It is a flat-top 55 body style, dark sunburst or black, two "T top" humbuckers, no binding, dot inlays, and a bolt on neck. The GK-55 also came equipped with the TP-6 fine-tuning tailpiece. These were made in the Gibson plant in Kalamazoo, Michigan from 1979 through early 1981. The GK stands for Gibson-Kalamazoo.

The Gibson model GK-55 was produced for only three consecutive years in short runs. Although the exact quantity produced is a matter of debate, the consensus is that only around 1000 were made.

== The changing face of Gibson ==
It is rumored by some Gibson employees that the GK-55 may have possibly been an attempt by Gibson to re-purpose Baldwin overstock parts remaining in the Kalamazoo plant. Other guitars constructed at that plant were products such as Kalamazoo (with its waning popularity), Epiphone & Baldwin. The exception being that the Baldwin series head stock was identical in design to the only other "Bolt-on" made at the time. It is more likely that Gibson was looking to put a less expensive alternative to the popular Les Paul line. With the diminishing quality of US made guitars in the late '70s, both Gibson & Fender were reaching for higher margin products to bolster profits.

The only concrete source to confirm this assertion would have been Gibson's Kalamazoo plant manager Jim Duerloo. Since Gibson's financial issues from 1974 to 1986 brought all production of Gibson, Epiphone & Kalamazoo electric guitars at the Kalamazoo plant to a halt. Shipping Epiphone overseas and moving Gibson to Memphis. Especially with the decrease in competition by Gibson copies, it was an obvious market opening for Gibson to take advantage of. Although, subject to conjecture, it is a brilliant marketing move for the new owners of almost defunct Gibson Guitars. CMI president Maurice Berlin, after taking over in 1974 did make some enduring decisions for the future of Gibson.

So while the GK-55 may not be a "feature rich" Gibson, it is one of the most iconic of the transition of Gibson Guitars, from failure to the manufacturer of some of the finest mass production guitars in the world today.

One of the main features of the GK-55 was the use of the "Bolt-On" neck which differentiated it from Les Paul's concept leaving it without the famous "Les Paul" monogram. Other distinguishing features were the use of the "Creme-Black" PAF pickups, seen more commonly now on Gibson products today, the very distinctive TP-6 "Fine-Tuning" system in place of the stock Gibson tail piece, commonly used, at the time and the lack of a pick guard. The peculiarity of the TP-6 was seen almost exclusively on tremolo systems (such as Kahler), and was not a popular addition to "hard-tail" guitars of the era adding to the unique qualities of the GK-55.

The GK-55 only came in one color, the two-tone dark sunburst, giving its flat top the appearance of depth, again unlike most of Gibson's mainstream.

As with most of the Gibson line, at the time it came standard with either a black or a maroon red "Gibson" tagged hard shell case and sold for under $400 at the time.
