= 1930 Gibson Marshall Special =

1930 Gibson guitar

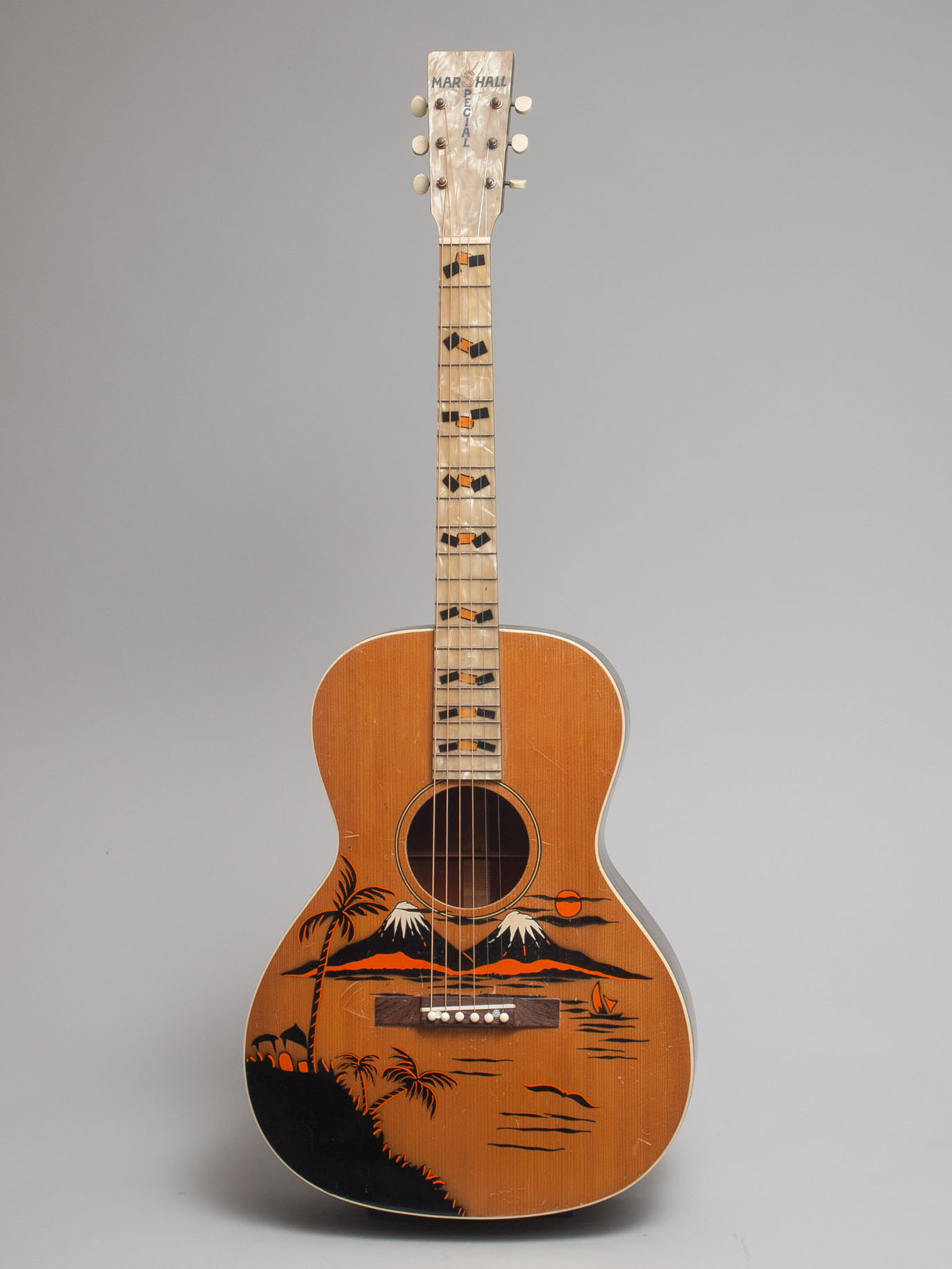
1930 Marshall Special

The Gibson Marshall Special was built in 1930 for Lilian G. Marshall, a Hawaiian guitar teacher and orchestra leader in Hartford, CT.

The body style is the same shape and size as the Gibson L-00 with a 12-fret neck joint. Unlike most L-00 style guitars built as other brands the Marshall Special has an X-braced top. The bracing is the lightest of any Gibson flat-top guitar ever made. The top of the guitar is painted with a tropical volcano scene. The fingerboard and headstock are covered in pearloid and have geometric designs silkscreened as position markers. he Marshall Special is considered one of the rarest Gibson-made models with only two known examples in existence. The musician Steve Earle reported that he owns one of these two guitars.
