= Gibson Robot Guitar =

Self-tuning guitar

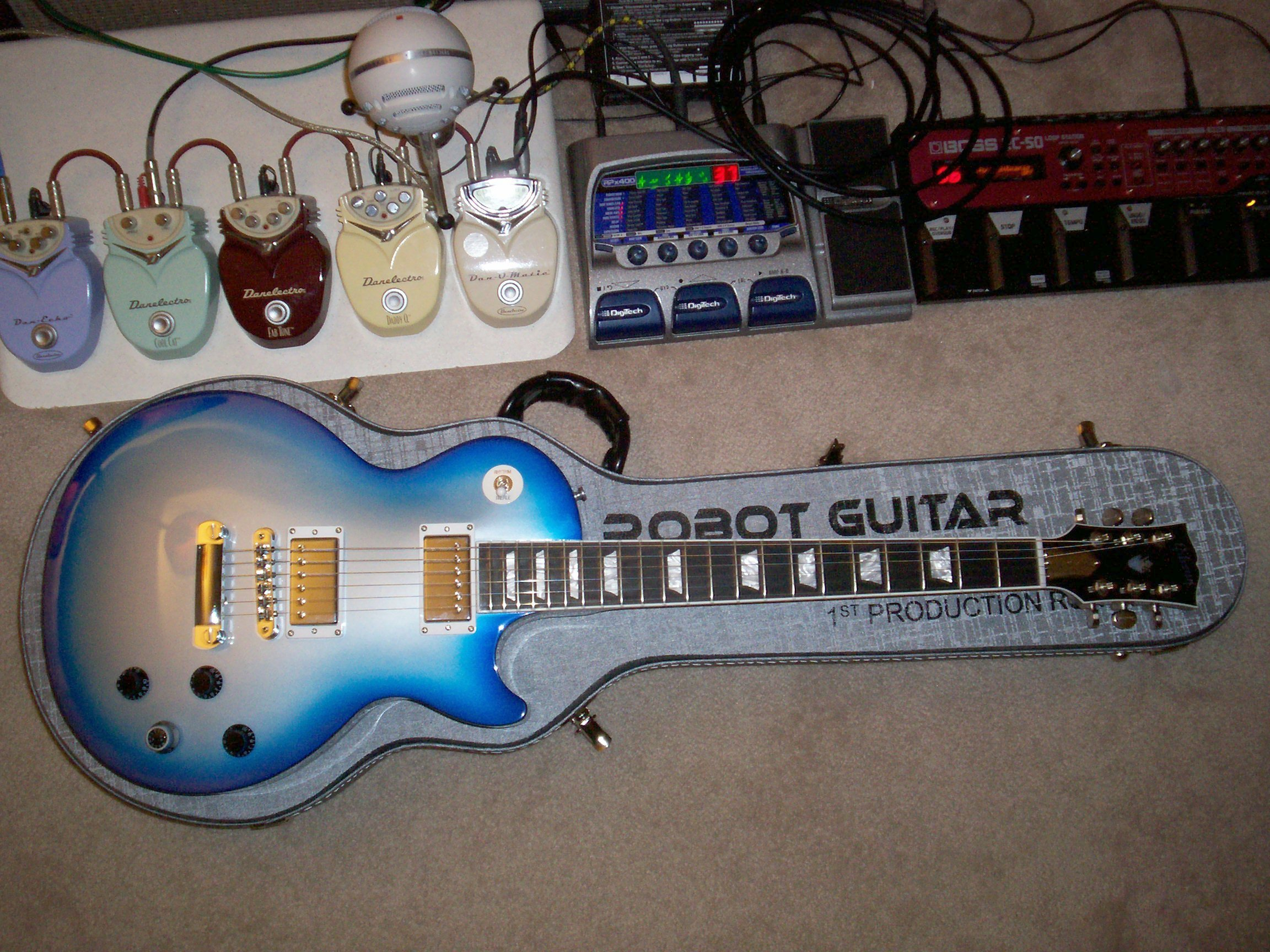
- Manufacturer: Gibson
- Period: December 7, 2007 (Limited Run)

Construction
- Body type: Solid

Woods
- Body: Mahogany
- Neck: Mahogany
- Fretboard: Rosewood ('Production' Les Paul, SG), Ebony (Flying V, Explorer, 'Original' Robot Les Paul)

Hardware
- Bridge: Fixed
- Pickup(s): H-H

Colors available
- Blue sunburst

The Gibson Robot Guitar (a.k.a. GOR) is a limited-edition self-tuning Gibson guitar, typically a Les Paul. The first run of limited edition Robot Guitars was exclusively made up of Les Paul bodies. Five different Gibson models were available (2008-2011, Robot X-plorer 2008-2012)) with Robot Guitar features: The Robot Les Paul Studio, Robot SG, Robot Flying V, Robot X-plorer, and a Robot Les Paul Junior. Developed by Chris Adams, its most notable feature is that it uses an onboard computer to automatically tune itself. This is not the first guitar to be able to tune itself, but it is regarded as the most modern, unique, and non-invasive self-tuning model available, because it does not employ cams or cantilevers throughout the body of the guitar.

== Technical information ==
The tuning system used on the Gibson Robot Guitar is based on the aftermarket Powertune system, which was developed by the Tronical Company of Germany. The Gibson system uses the standard Tune-o-matic style bridge typical on their guitars, but modifications were made to have individual piezo saddles that transmit each string's pitch to the microprocessor. The computer analyzes the signal, and then controls each of the Powerhead Locking Tuners. Each tuner is run by a small servo motor that works in sync with the bridge to bring the string up to pitch by altering the string's tension until it is within a desired tolerance. The entire system is powered by a nickel metal hydride rechargeable battery pack housed in the control cavity of the guitar.

== Features and functionality ==
The Robot Guitar appears to have the standard four knobs for individual pickup volume and tone controls; however, in place of the bridge pickup tone knob, there is the Master Control Knob (MCK). The control functions like a “push-pull” knob: when in the down position, it functions like a standard control. When in the up position, however, the MCK is what coordinates the automatic tuning for the guitar by sending the information and power to the neck PCB through the strings. Then the PCB activates the robot tuners by contact.

Users can choose from seven factory presets for tunings, six of which are editable. Each tuning can be returned to "standard" tuning of A (440 Hz) by simply pulling up on the MCK knob, and strumming the strings lightly.

== Similar systems ==
While Gibson advertised the guitar in America as a "world first," similar systems developed by Transperformance have been in use for decades. Jimmy Page currently uses a Les Paul Goldtop with the Transperformance system in it. This system is also endorsed by Graham Nash as well as Ed Roland. The drawback to the Transperformance system is that it requires heavy modification to the instrument, including routing and installing multiple cams and cantilevers.
