= Gibson B series =

Acoustic guitar series

The Gibson B series was a series of acoustic guitars manufactured by Gibson Guitar Corporation between 1961 and 1979, and as a reissue to a limited degree from 1991 to 1992. The series consisted of the three different models, the B-45, the B-25, and the B-15 (the Blue Book also lists a B-20, with a run of 500 units). The B-45 was only available as a 12-string edition; the B-25 was available as a standard edition, a 12-string edition, and a ¾ scale body edition; and the B-15 was only available as a standard edition.

== B-45 ==
The B-45-12, a 12-string edition guitar introduced in 1961, was the first B-45 model guitar available and the first B series overall. The B-45-12 had a mahogany body and neck, spruce top, rosewood fingerboard, and a cherry sunburst finish, and was made with "round" shoulders for the 1961 – 1962 model year and "square" shoulders until the end of its production in 1979. Starting in 1963, the B-45-12-N was also available as a natural finish edition.

From 1991 – 1992, Gibson manufactured a reissue of the B-45-12 with rosewood sides and back.

== B-25 ==
Gibson introduced the B-25 in 1961 which featured a mahogany body (solid back, laminated sides), solid spruce top, and rosewood fingerboard like the B-45. The B-25 featured a smaller body than the B-45 and after 1965 they had a narrow neck (1 5/8" nut) while the earliest models had the standard 1 11/16" nut. Many came with a plastic bridge and ceramic adjustable saddle. Some B-25's had a cherry sunburst finish, but there were a limited number of ebony finish editions with white pickguards. There was also a natural finish B-25-N edition. Production of these standard B-25's ended in 1977.

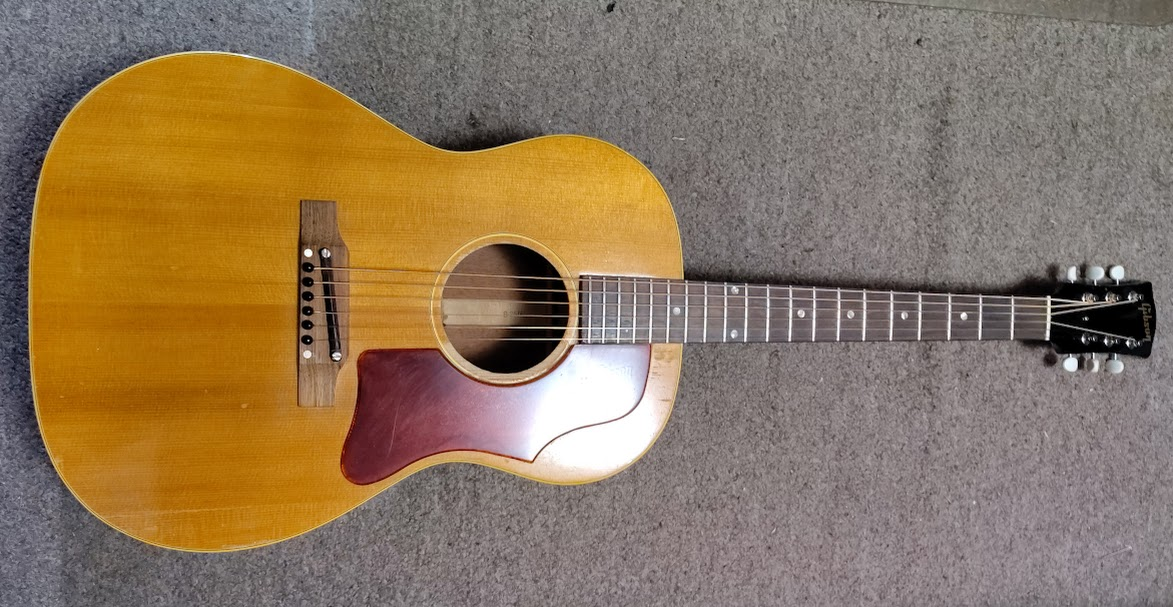
1968 Gibson B-25N Acoustic Guitar

Gibson produced a "short scale" version of the B-25, the B-25 ¾, with the same features as the standard B-25 but with a ¾ size body and a different sunburst finish. Gibson manufactured this edition from 1962 through 1968. From 1966 – 1968, the natural finish B-25-N ¾ was also available. The short scale editions were marketed as "student" guitars.

Two 12-string editions of the B-25 were also available starting in 1962. The B-25-12 had a cherry sunburst finish and was available through 1970. Gibson manufactured the natural finish B-25-12-N through 1977, the last year of production for all B series guitars.

In 2012, Gibson Custom Shop launched the "Icon '60s" series, reissued many classic models. Although never appeared on Gibson's official website or media presses, there is a batch of B-25 and B-24 3/4 also produced, especially for the Japan market.

== B-15 ==
In 1967, the B-15 became the last model of the B series Gibson introduced. It featured a mahogany body, [spruce] top, rosewood fingerboard, and natural finish. Gibson also referred to the B-15 as a "student model" and manufactured it through 1970.

== See also ==
- Gibson Guitar Corporation product list
