= Gibson Gospel =

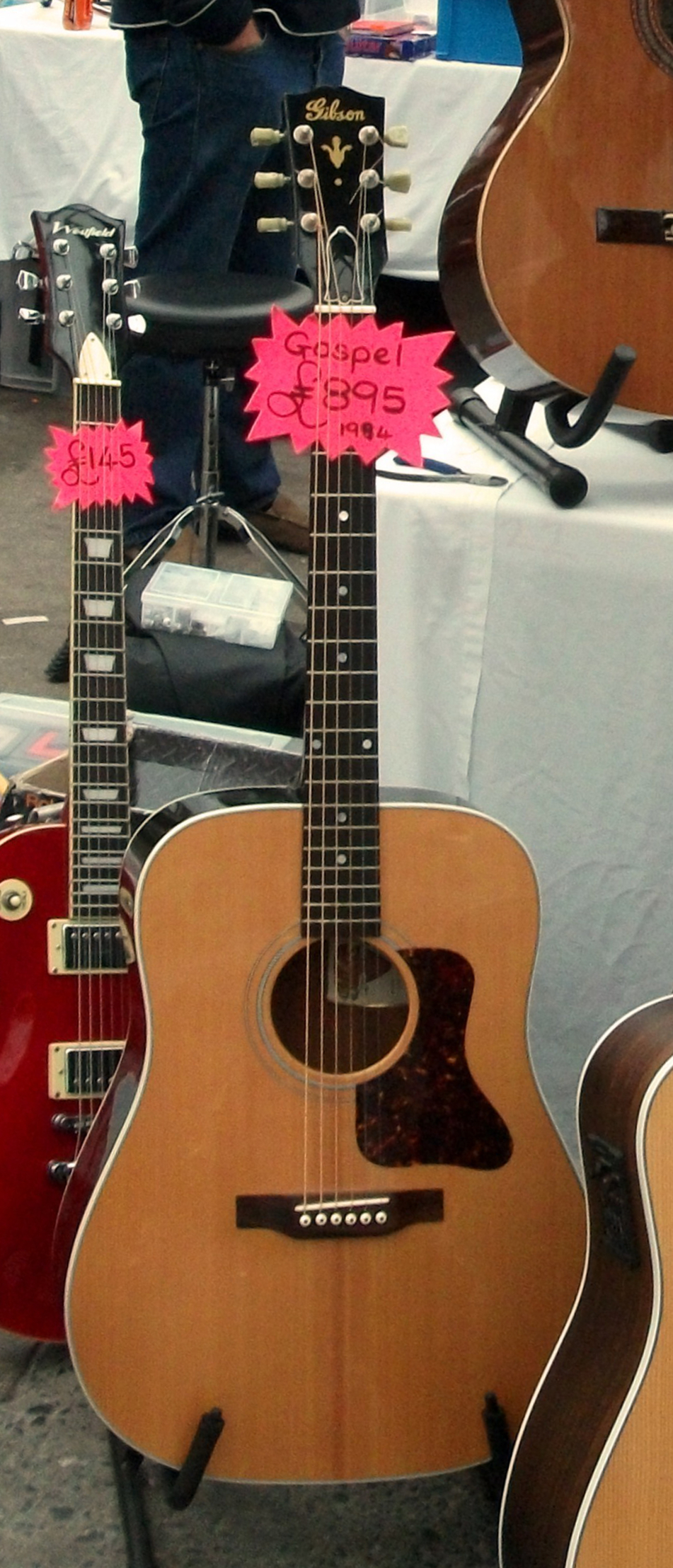
Gibson Gospel (1994)

The Gibson Gospel is an acoustic guitar by Gibson Guitar Corporation. It has a flat top, hard square shoulders and a unique arched back. The guitar has a natural finish, solid wood sides, laminated arched back and a tortoise-shell design pickguard.

There are two main batches of this guitar, the originals (1972-1979) and the re-issues (1992-1997). The 100th anniversary model (1994) is included in the re-issues. The original issue had maple sides with an arched, laminated back, as well as a maple neck. The reissue, however, varied greatly in that all maple was replaced with mahogany on the neck, sides and back, though the back did keep its arched shape. This is also the guitar used by Phoebe Buffay in the TV show Friends.
