= Gibson Hummingbird =

Steel-string acoustic guitar

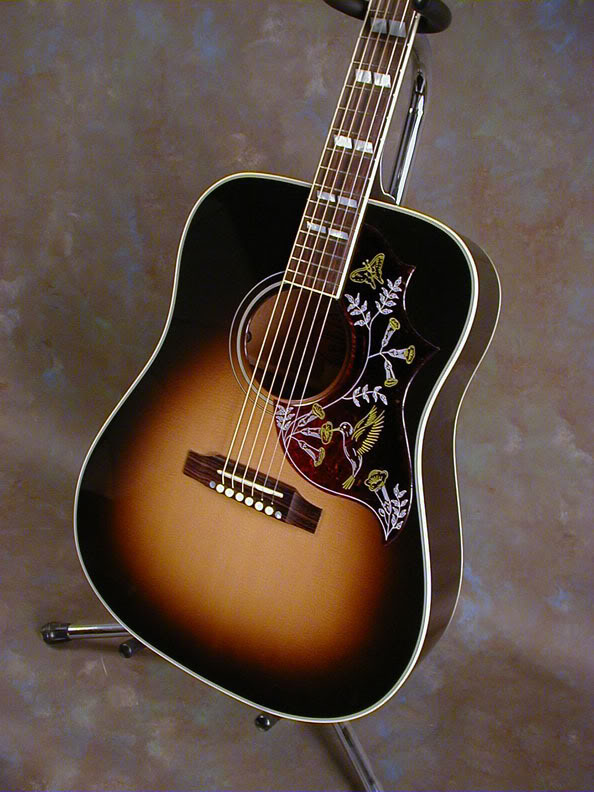
- Gibson Hummingbird Special Edition
- Manufacturer: Gibson
- Period: 1960–present

Construction
- Body type: Square-shoulder dreadnought
- Neck joint: Dovetail

Woods
- Body: Sitka Spruce top Mahogany back and sides
- Neck: Mahogany
- Fretboard: Rosewood

Hardware
- Bridge: Rosewood
- Pickup: L.R. Baggs Element Active

Colors available
- Natural, Heritage Cherry Sunburst, Vintage Sunburst

The Gibson Hummingbird is an acoustic guitar model/series produced by the Gibson Guitar Corporation.

Unlike the other flat-top Gibson acoustics, the Hummingbird was Gibson's first square-shoulder dreadnought, similar to those produced by C.F. Martin & Company. Introduced in 1960, the Hummingbird was Gibson's second-most expensive acoustic guitar, behind the Gibson J-200, until the introduction of the Gibson Dove in 1962 (a blend between the Hummingbird and the J-200), and has remained in production ever since. In 2000 the Gibson Hummingbird was the winner of Acoustic Guitar's Player's Choice Award in the Dreadnought Category, and was described thus: "The Hummingbird has a very wide range of sound, from gutsy and loud, to sweet and soft. Superb for all styles of playing, whether just playing chords or intricate solos."

== Models ==
=== Historical models ===
The first wave of Hummingbirds came with a solid Sitka spruce top and solid mahogany back. The sides are mahogany, but not all of them are solid; many are laminated. They have adjustable rosewood or ceramic saddles, three-ply maple bridge plates, single X-bracing, engraved hummingbird, butterfly and trumpet-flower pickguards with two points on the upper treble bout and one point level with the bridge, as well as bound fretboards with double parallelogram inlays, a crown peghead inlay on the headstock, golden green button tulip tuners, and a cherry sunburst finish.

A limited number of Hummingbirds produced in 1962 and 1963 have maple backs and sides. A natural top with cherry back-and-sides finish was available in 1963. Since then, the size of the pickguard has been slightly reduced.

During 1965 the nut width decreased from 1 11/16 to 1 5/8, and in 1968 the bottom belly bridge became more square. At the same time the bracing became bulkier, which somewhat altered the sound of the guitar. A percentage of Hummingbirds were produced with a tobacco sunburst finish and the pickguards were attached with five screws for between one and two years. A double X-bracing was used between 1971 and the mid-80's.

Since 1970, the saddles are no longer adjustable, and the necks are made of laminated three-piece mahogany. The fretboard inlays were changed to blocks, then restored to double parallelograms in 1984.

=== Mass production models ===
==== Standard models ====
The name of standard models varies during the years, from Hummingbird with no suffix, Hummingbird Modern Classic to Hummingbird Standard. These models often have AA or AAA-grade solid Sitka spruce tops with a mahogany back and sides. A Hummingbird of this category features a rosewood fretboard with double parallelogram inlays, a crown peghead inlay headstock, nickel Grover Rotomatic tuners and a custom-made Hummingbird tortoiseshell pickguard. An L.R. Baggs Element Active pickup system is also installed. This model is available in different cherryburst variations from strong orange to almost yellow, heritage cherryburst, and natural finishes. Standard Hummingbirds also seen in wine red and black.

==== Vintage models ====
The Hummingbird Vintage, formally the Hummingbird True Vintage, features a vintage appearance and sound from its "thermally cured" spruce top. It also has gold Gotoh green button tulip tuners and a vintage cherryburst finish, which make the guitar resemble its 1960s ancestors. It also has the famous, often adored, wildlife motif engraved and hand-painted on the pickguard, rather than embedded as on the standard model. The vintage model has no electronics from the factory.

=== Small-batch, limited, and custom shop models ===
==== Icon '60s ====
The Icon '60s Hummingbird is a natural-finished model with block inlays in the fretboard rather than the double parallelograms. It also has an adjustable Tusq saddle and an original 1960s-style Hummingbird pickguard; all of these make it look like a 1960s vintage model.

==== Custom KOA ====
The Hummingbird Custom KOA model is a custom model, with back and sides constructed from highly figured koa wood. It has gold Grover mother of pearl keystone tuners, a custom in-flight hummingbirds peghead logo and a hummingbird floral tortoiseshell pickguard, all expressed in genuine abalone and mother-of-pearl. It also has an ebony fretboard with rolled edges and Orpheum-style abalone inlays. This model has an antique natural finish.

==== Hummingbird Red Spruce ====
Introduced as the monthly limited edition of December 2016, featuring select Adirondack red spruce top with mahogany back and sides.

==== 50th Anniversary ====
In 2010, Gibson introduced the Limited Edition 50th Anniversary 1960 Hummingbird series, including the Standard (Heritage Dark Cherry Sunburst), the Rosewood (Heritage Dark Cherry Sunburst) and the KOA (Gold Honey Burst) models.

==== Eric Church Hummingbird Dark ====
In 2016, Gibson produced a limited number of "Hummingbird Dark" guitars which are slightly thinner than a standard Hummingbird, use a black translucent finish, a red-filled pickguard, and carry the signature of country artist Eric Church.

==== Hummingbird Silver Burst ====
In 2007, Gibson produced a small batch of silver burst Hummingbird.

==== Hummingbird, Fuller's Vintage Edition ====
In 2008 Gibson also released a very few Hummingbird Modern Classics with a Vintage Sunburst finish, the same finish seen on a J-45 Standard. The Gibson label found on the inside of this Hummingbird says "Hummingbird, Fuller's Vintage Edition". All the other specifications, such as materials and tuning keys, are the same as the specifications of the standard model.

=== Special models ===
==== Artist ====
The Hummingbird Artist model is quite different. It is a Guitar Center exclusive release. It has the body shape and forward shifted bracing of the Songwriter, only in mahogany. It does not have a Hummingbird pickguard (it uses a modern sculpted pickguard instead). An L.R. Baggs Element Active pickup system is also installed. This model has a washed heritage cherry finish.

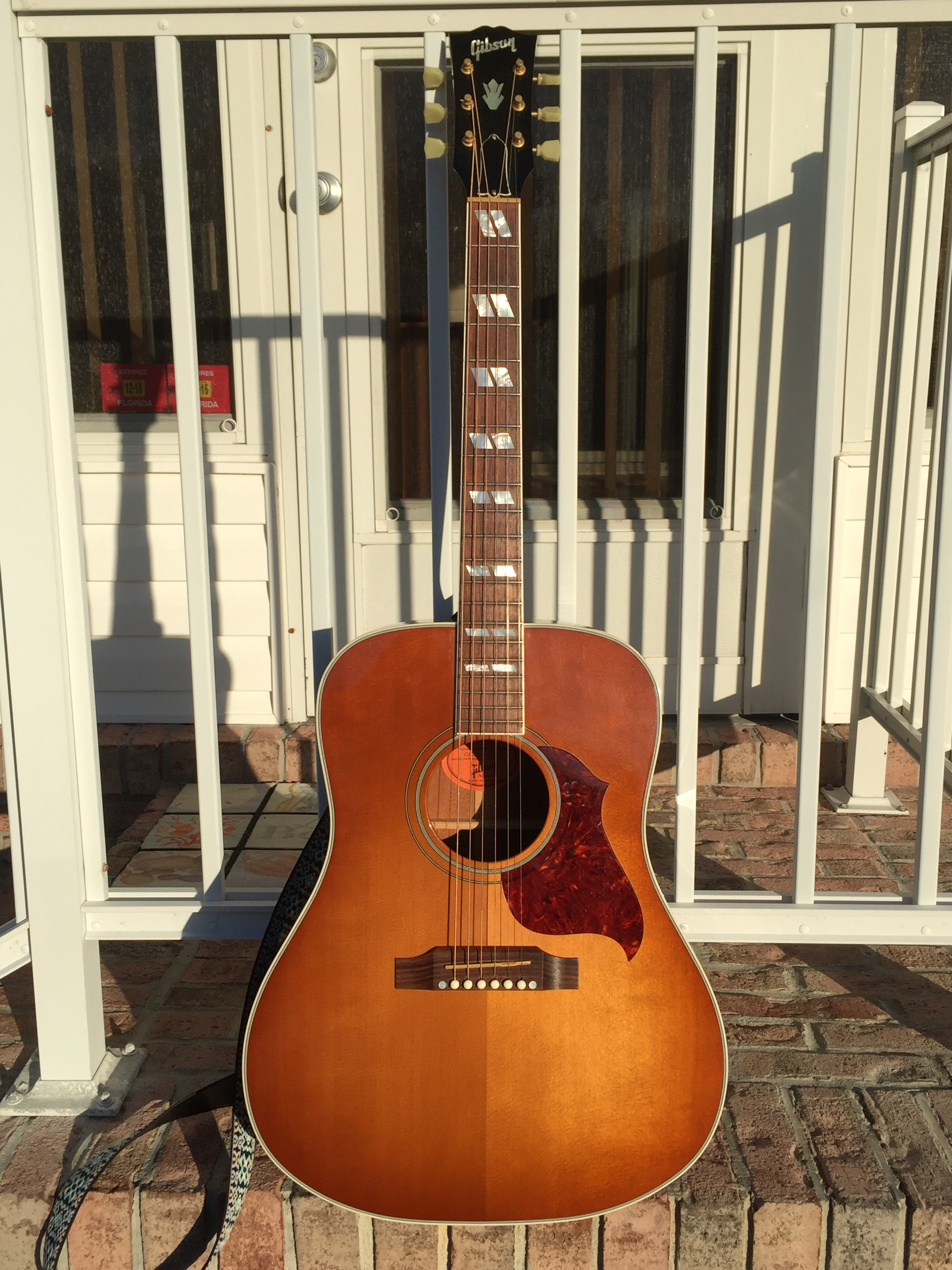
Gibson Hummingbird Artist model

==== Pro ====
The Hummingbird Pro model was released by Guitar Center and Musicians Friend but is available from other dealers, specially in Europe. It has the same shape as the Artist model. A cutaway model (Hummingbird Pro EC) is also available. The Hummingbird Pro comes with an L.R. Baggs Element Active pickup system, while the cutaway model has a Fishman Prefix Plus-T preamp system equipped. This model has a vintage sunburst finish. The Pro model shares most of the features of the standard Hummingbird and has a bone nut and saddle.

== Epiphone versions ==
A more affordable version of the Hummingbird is also made by the Epiphone branch of Gibson. The original Epiphone Hummingbird was available in natural, cherryburst and black. It was also made with more affordable woods but featured the same design fretboard inlays, bridge and similar pickguard, but without genuine mother-of-pearl. It also featured Grover tuners, rather than the unbranded tuners featured on cheaper Epiphone models. The Epiphone Hummingbird was made in China.

Epiphone reintroduced their version of Gibson's Hummingbird in 2012. Called the Hummingbird Pro, it features a solid spruce top (instead of a laminate top), a mahogany body and neck, a Shadow ePerformer pickup system, and a heritage cherryburst finish. The Hummingbird Pros are made in Indonesia.

In 2021 Epiphone produced a line of acoustics “Inspired by Gibson”, all made in the Samick factory in Indonesia. This also includes a Hummingbird version (next to a j45 and a j200 model). The specifications of this Hummingbird are very close to the Gibson Standard Hummingbird original with spruce top and mahogany back and sides, all solid woods. The fretboard is made of Indian laurel, the inlays are mother of pearl and both nut and saddle are bone. There is a Fishman Sonicore under the saddle piezo pickup system.

== Notable Hummingbird players ==
Many musicians have used the Hummingbird for their songs, especially for the melodies and guitar lines.
