= Gibson L-4 =

Archtop guitar by Gibson

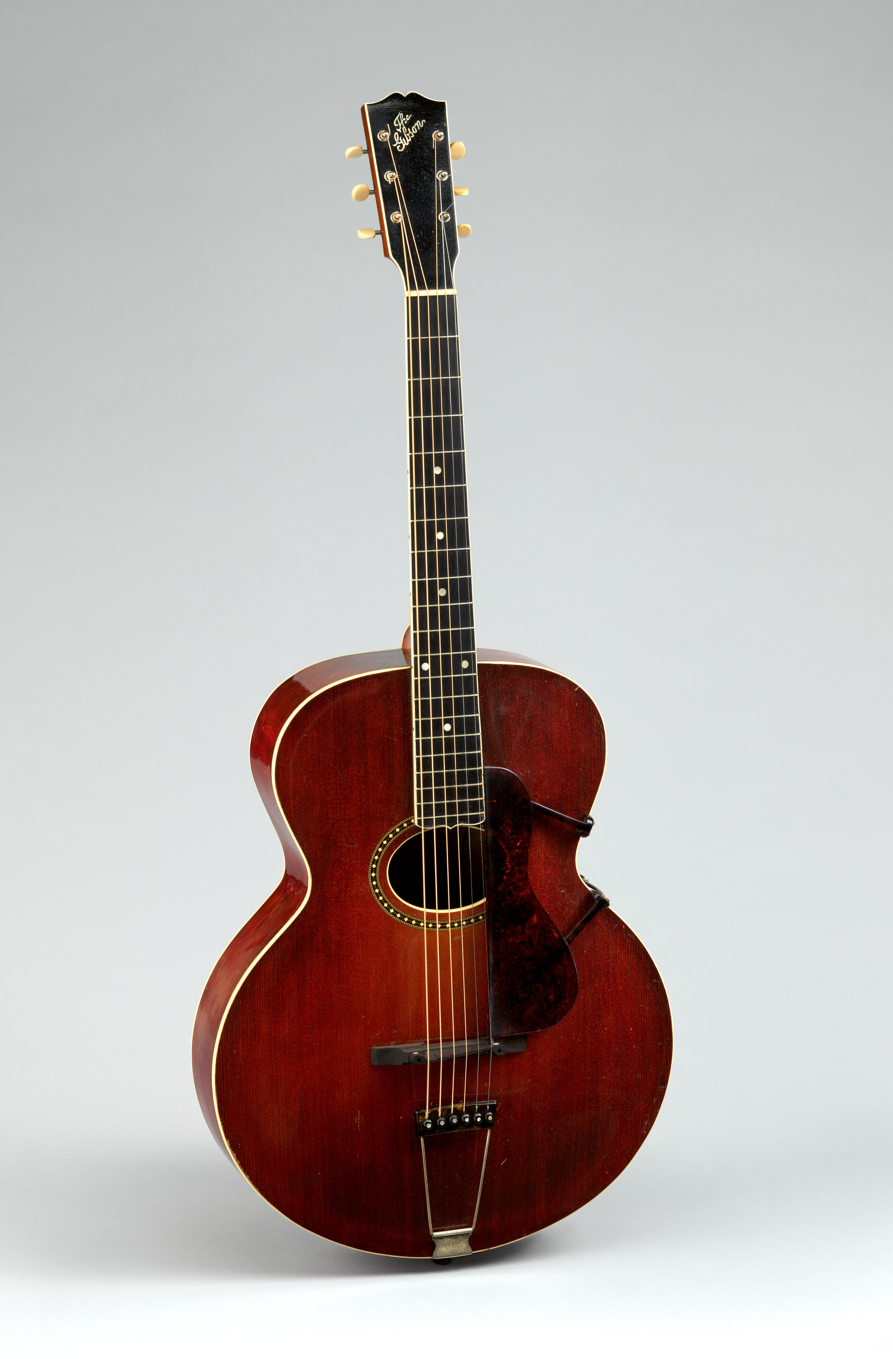
Gibson L-4 (c. 1918)

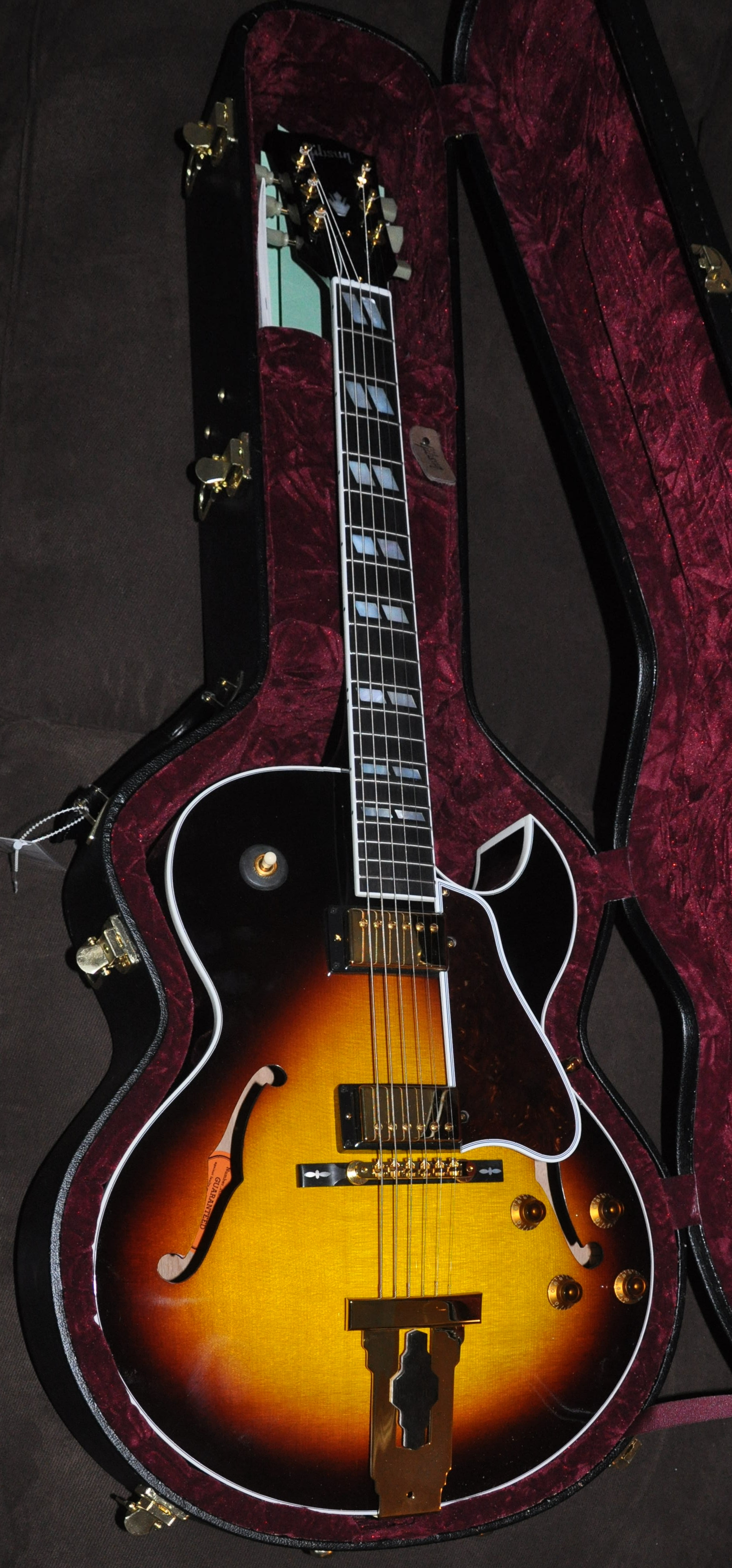
Gibson L-4 CES (after 1980s)

Gibson L-4 refers to several archtop guitars produced by the Gibson Guitar Corporation.

The L-4 was first introduced in 1911 as an acoustic rhythm guitar with an oval sound hole and 12 frets to the neck; it was used by Eddie Lang, who also played an L-5.

In 1928, Gibson redesigned the guitar, swapping out the oval soundhole for a round one, extending the neck to 14 frets and cantilevering the end of the fretboard over the top, just as they did on the L-5. These changes greatly improved the sound of new L-4, which now had more volume, a brighter, clearer tone while still maintaining its warmth. In 1935 Gibson redesigned the guitar yet again, this time dropping the round soundhole in favor of f-holes.

In 1949, Gibson released the ES-175, which was essentially an electric version of the L-4 with a laminated (as opposed to carved) top and a florentine cutaway.

Electric versions of the L-4 (known as L-4 CES) with a carved top and a florentine cutaway, were released in limited runs throughout the 1950s.

In the late 1980s, Gibson reintroduced the L-4 CES, which has been in production ever since.

The current version features two humbucking pickups, a solid carved spruce top, and solid mahogany back and sides. Other differences with the ES-175 include gold hardware, a fancier tailpiece, a different pickguard, and the rhythm pickup mounted closer to the neck.
