= Gibson L-1 =

Model of acoustic guitar

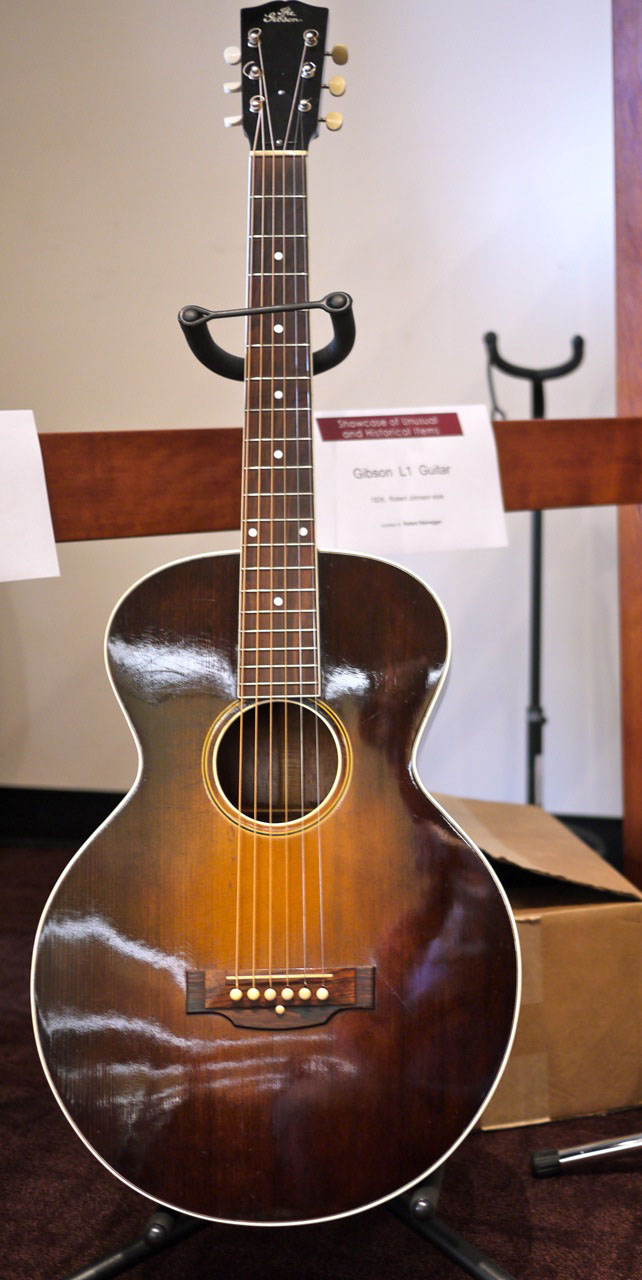
- A Gibson L1 pictured at the 2012 Northwest Handmade Musical Instrument Exhibit
- Manufacturer: Gibson
- Period: 1902–25, 1926–37, 1991–95, ?–present

Construction
- Body type: Hollow

Woods
- Body: Mahogany
- Neck: Mahogany

Hardware
- Bridge: Traditional Rectangle with Bone Saddle

Colors available
- Sunburst

The Gibson L-1 is an acoustic guitar that was first sold by the Gibson Guitar Corporation in the early 20th century. The L-1 model was introduced first as an archtop (1902), and later as a flat top in 1926. The model is famously associated with the legendary bluesman Robert Johnson.

== History ==
1902 L-1 introduction specs (acoustic archtop): single bound round soundhole with 2 rope pattern wood rings, single bound top, ebony fingerboard, dot fingerboard inlays, orange top finish, dark mahogany back and sides, 2 sizes.

1908 L-1 specs: 13.5" wide, narrower waist, trapeze tailpiece with pins anchored in tortoise celluloid plate, elavated pickguard, 13 frets clear of the body, bound fingerboard, slated "The Gibson" logo.

1912 L-1 specs: No pickguard.

1914 L-1 specs: Pickguard added again.

1918 L-1 specs: Sheraton brown finish.

1920 L-1 specs: Double 5 ply soundhole rings.

1925 Discontinued.

1926 Re-introduced as a flat top.

The L-1 flat top was introduced in 1926 and was available until 1937. This model cost $50 (equivalent to $888 in 2024). The L-1 featured a tighter grained two piece spruce top and Honduran mahogany back and sides. In some cases the back was single piece and in others it was two. Top and back were bound in ivoroid. A 2-part bridge was used in the 1928 model. In 1930 Gibson squared off the bottom to a more traditional shape as opposed to the previously "egg shaped" bottom commonly known as the Robert Johnson style.

In the early 1990s Gibson reissued the L-1 using the same specifications as the earlier version. These guitars were crafted in the Montana shop and were hand built using the same techniques as the original offering. In the late 1990s or early 2000s, Gibson introduced the L-1 Robert Johnson acoustic guitar model, the guitar features the historic small L-series body design (25" scale length), ebony bridge with carved pyramid wings, 3 3/4-inch soundhole diameter, and a Robert Johnson signature inlay at the end of the fingerboard.

== Gallery ==
Changes of design in each era, mentioned above:

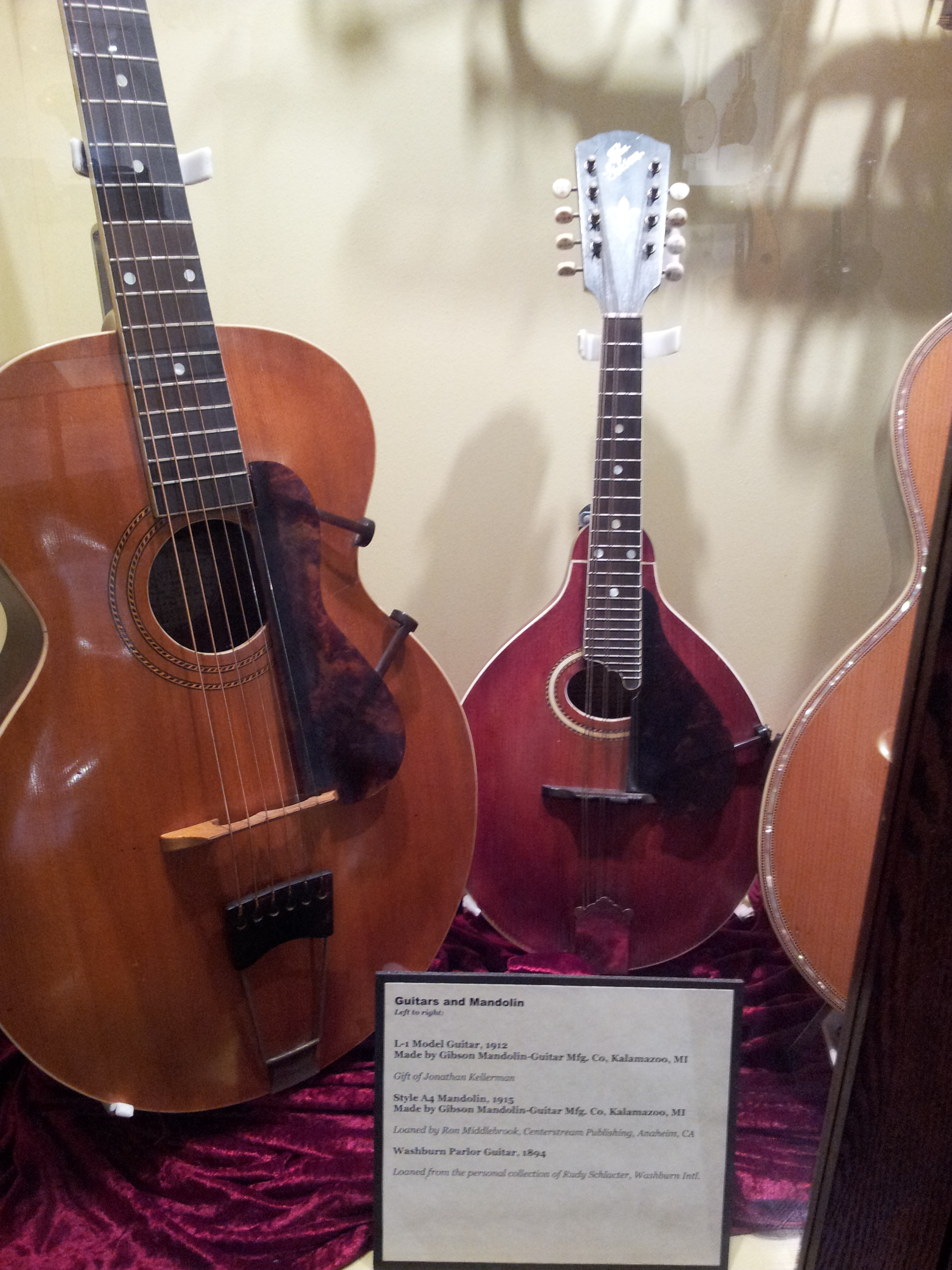
1912 L-1
- archtop
- trapeze tailpiece
- carved bridge
- with pickguard

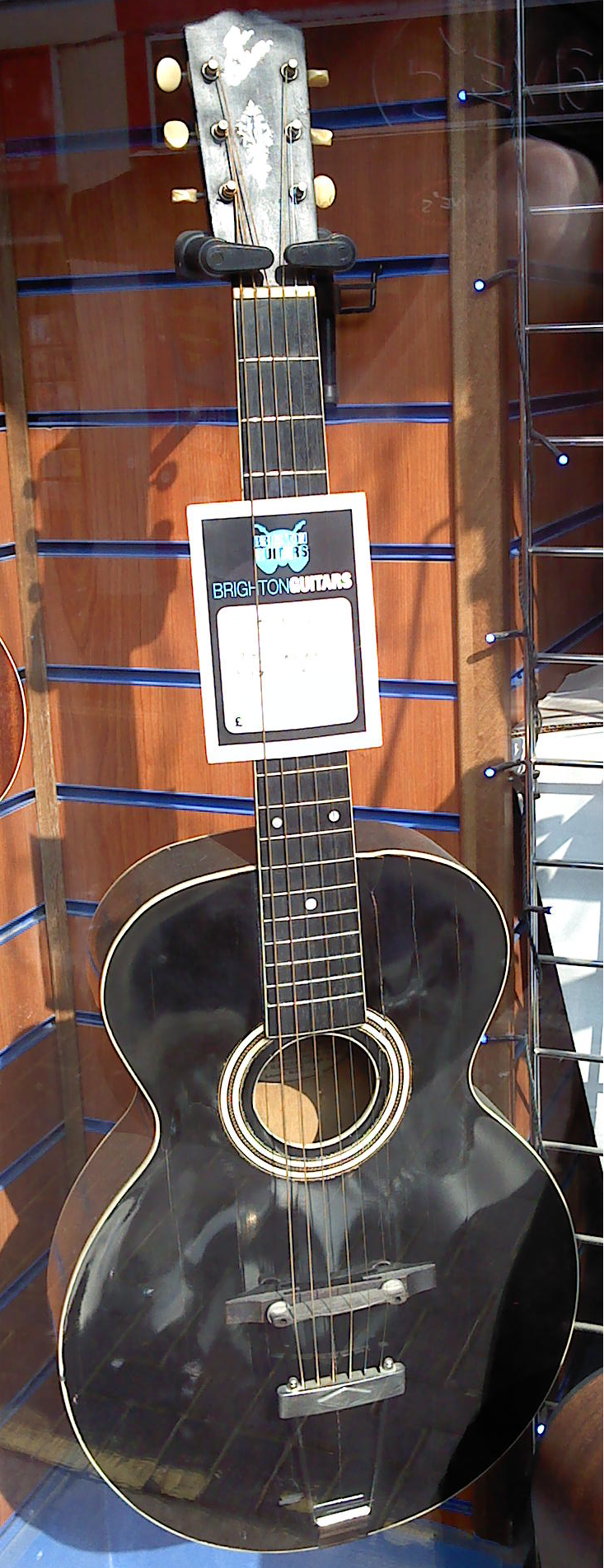
1918 L-1
- archtop
- trapeze tailpiece
- adjustable bridge

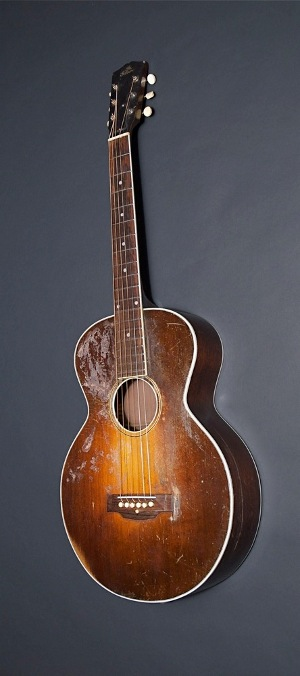
1928 L-1
- flattop
- egg shaped bottom
- 2-part bridge with end pins

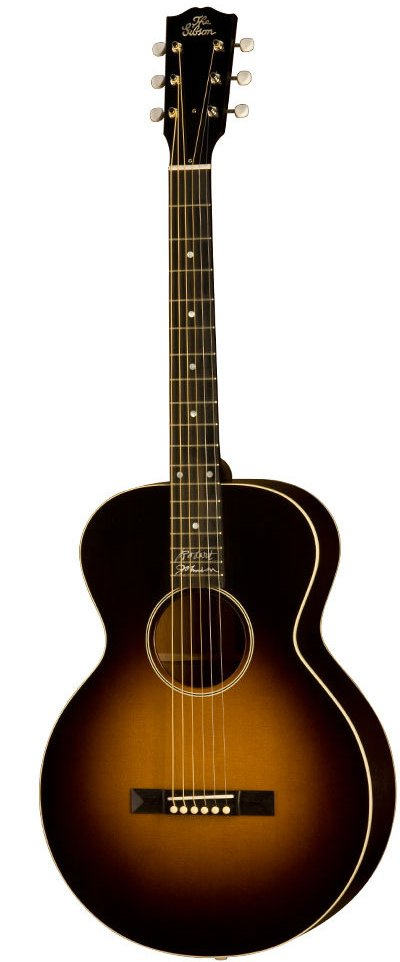
1990s or 2000s Robert Johnson L-1
- flattop
- squared off bottom
- pyramid bridge with end pins
