= Gibson ES-137 =

Electric guitar model

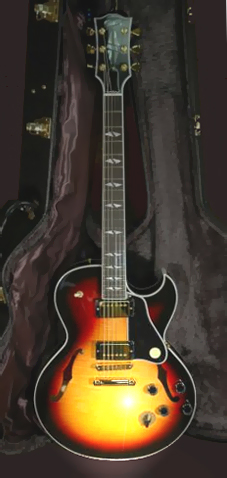
- Manufacturer: Gibson
- Period: 2002 — 2013 (limited production)

Construction
- Body type: Semi-hollow
- Neck joint: Set

Woods
- Body: curly maple (laminated); mahogany center block
- Neck: maple
- Fretboard: rosewood on Classic models, ebony on Custom

Hardware
- Bridge: Fixed tune-o-matic
- Pickup: 2 Humbuckers

Colors available
- Heritage Cherry Sunburst, Tri-burst, Light-Burst, Blues Burst, Candy-Apple Red, Silvertop

The Gibson ES-137 is a semi-hollow-body guitar which was manufactured in Gibson's Custom Shop Memphis factory as a limited production run from 2002–2013. It was a relatively new design in Gibson's ES line which was not based on a vintage instrument, as many of Gibson's instruments are. The ES-137 is available in three models, Custom, Classic, and Standard.

Gibson claims the ES-137 is a combination of its traditional semi-hollow-body single-cutaway guitars with the sound of a Les Paul Classic. This is achieved by fitting the archtop with pickups and other features matching the Les Paul.

The format of archtop with a single florentine cutaway has been used by Gibson previously. Notable comparisons would be the Gibson ES-175 and Gibson ES-135 models. The basic body shape of the ES-137 is very close to Gibson's fully hollow-bodied ES-175. Despite the 137 being somewhat thinner than the ES-175, it is not classed as a thinline model. However, the ES-137 does sport an internal mahogany center block inside the body. This design eliminates feedback problems common with hollow-bodied guitars. The center block also facilitates the use of a stop tailpiece alike the ES-335, therefore eliminating the use of a "trapeze"-style tailpiece found on most hollow-bodied Gibsons.

== Notable ES-137 players ==
- Matthew Followill (Kings Of Leon)
- Cameron Muncey (Jet)
- Roky Erickson (13th Floor Elevators)
- Billie Joe Armstrong (Green Day)
- Roland Orzabal (Tears for Fears)
- Franny Beecher (Bill Haley, Benny Goodman, Buddy Greco)
- Chris Daughtry (Daughtry)
- Anton Jansson
