= Gibson ES-135 =

Semi-hollow body electric guitar

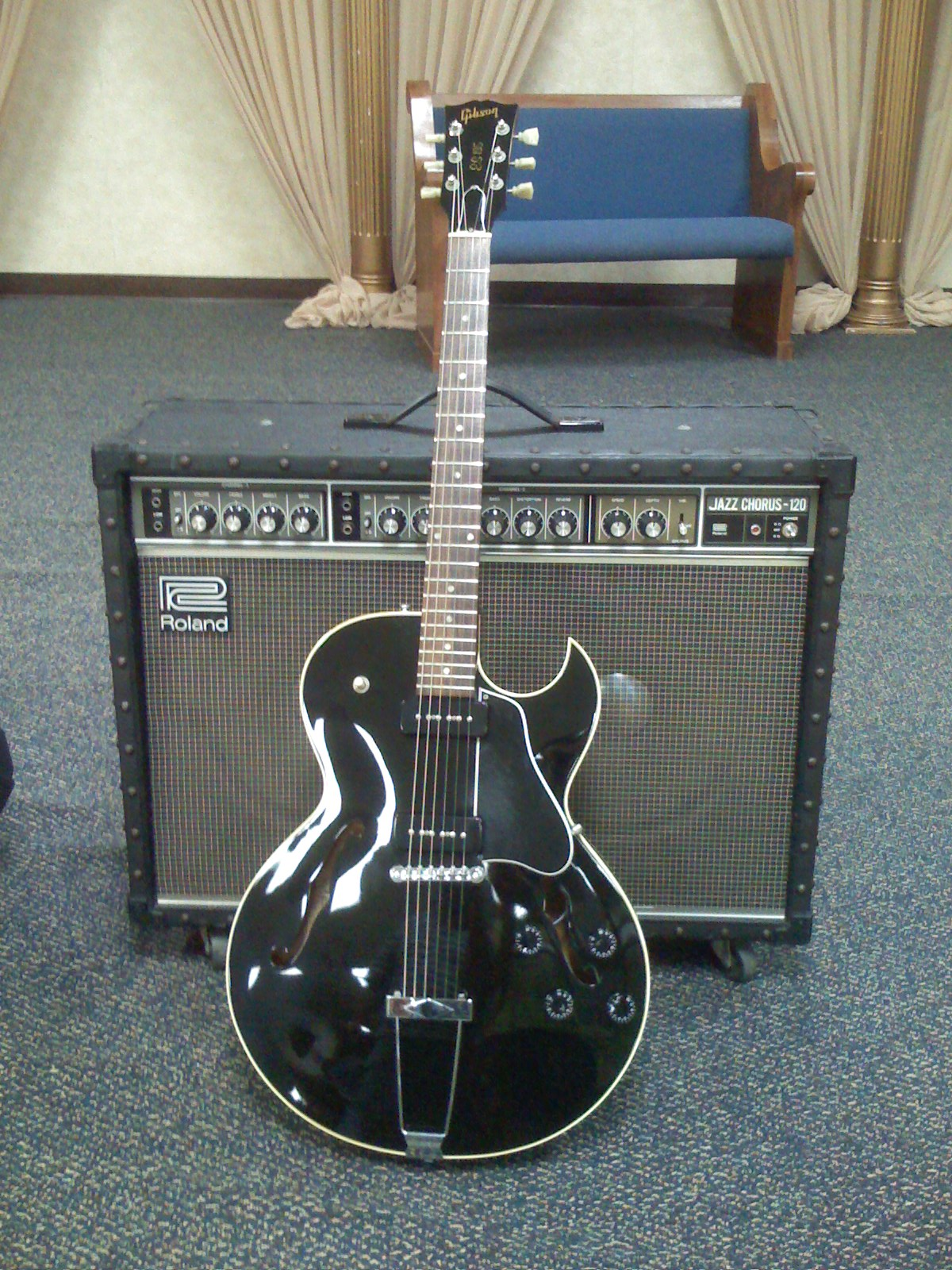
Gibson ES-135 with Roland JC-120

The Gibson ES-135 is a semi-hollow body electric guitar made by the Gibson Guitar Corporation. Originally introduced in 1956, it was discontinued in 1958. Some guitars were stamped with and marketed as an ES-130. The original run amounted to 556 instruments produced. The model, with some modifications, was reintroduced in 1991 and remained in production until 2004.

The Gibson ES-135 has a Florentine cutaway, a trapeze tailpiece, two P-100 pickups (stacked humbuckers with P-90 covers) with two tone and volume controls and a three-way switch. It had looks and tone reminiscent of the old ES-125 TDC, but was not a fully hollow thinline guitar. The ES-135 has a feedback-suppressing sustain block running under the pickups and bridge from the neck/body joint to the base of the body like the ES-335. Unlike the ES-335, the sustain block in the ES-135 was made of balsa wood rather than maple. The body itself and neck were again of similar construction to the ES-335, being built from laminated maple but with an unbound rosewood fingerboard with dot-style fret position markers. The metal fittings were chrome-plated, and the P-100s had black plastic "soapbar" style covers. The guitar, when launched, was the most basic and lowest-priced in the Gibson ES range, but had the same fittings, wiring and construction quality as more expensive models. At launch, Gibson claimed it was the first semi-solid electric guitar with a Florentine-style single cutaway in the world.

The ES-135 went through several changes during its production life. The P-100 pickups, intended to have the tone and output of the P-90 but without the single-coil P-90's tendency to hum, did not meet with universal approval, having a slightly less biting tone and at times an equal tendency to squeal at high volumes. The use of P-100s was therefore discontinued and conventional Gibson covered humbuckers substituted. The original trapeze tailpiece gave the guitar a distinctive tone and an aggressive "bark" when played with vigor, but, as was stated before, was not entirely popular. The trapeze makes re-stringing a slow operation and the very long string length needed to reach from the tailpiece to the tuners meant some brands of strings did not fit.

The ES-135 Studio featured no f-holes, a stop tailpiece and Tune-O-Matic bridge, and humbuckers.

The 1991 reissue was similarly constructed with a balsa block, Tune-O-Matic, and P-100s.

The Gibson Guitar Corporation released a similar model with more up-market appointments (neck binding and inlays) and two classic humbucking pickups, the Gibson ES-137, in 2002.

== See also ==
- Gibson ES Series
