= Gibson Victory Bass =

Bass guitar model, produced 1981-1986

- Manufacturer: Gibson
- Period: 1981 – 1986

Construction
- Body type: Solid, double cut
- Neck joint: Bolt-on neck
- Scale: 34 in (860 mm)

Woods
- Body: Mahogany
- Fretboard: Rosewood

Hardware
- Bridge: Fixed
- Pickup(s): Single humbucker (Standard); Dual humbuckers (Custom and Artist)

The Gibson Victory Bass is an electric bass guitar designed by Wayne Charvel and produced by Gibson Guitars from 1981 until 1986. It was a bass guitar variant of the Gibson Victory. It was not a successful model.

== Models ==
The Victory Bass was only available as a four-string solid-body bass guitar. The scale was 34″, body made of maple and neck was three-ply maple with rosewood fingerboard. A fret-less version was an option. Three models of Victory Basses were produced:

- Standard - one Series VIIIB humbucker, three-ply maple neck, 24-fret rosewood fretboard, and passive electronics with one volume and one tone knob and a series/parallel switch.
- Custom - two Series VIIIB humbuckers, three-ply maple neck, 24-fret rosewood fretboard, and passive electronics with one volume and one tone knob, bass and treble controls, a pickup selector switch, and a series/parallel switch.
- Artist - two Series VIIIB humbuckers, three-ply maple neck, 24-fret rosewood fretboard, and passive/active electronics with one volume and one tone knob, bass and treble controls, a pickup selector switch, a series/parallel switch, and a three-position passive/active switch.
