= Gibson Dove =

Steel-string acoustic guitar

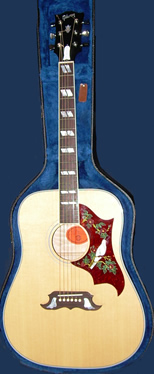
- 2005 Gibson Dove
- Manufacturer: Gibson
- Period: 1962–present

Construction
- Body type: Flattop
- Neck joint: Maple

Woods
- Body: Maple
- Neck: Maple
- Fretboard: Rosewood

Hardware
- Bridge: Tune-O-Matic or adjustable or fixed rosewood
- Pickup: LR Baggs

Colors available
- Sunburst, Natural, Ebony

The Gibson Dove is a flattop steel-string acoustic guitar made by the Gibson Guitar Corporation since 1962.

== History ==
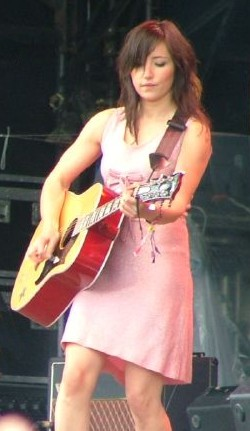
KT Tunstall performing at the 2005 Glastonbury Festival with a Gibson Dove.

The Dove was Gibson's second square-shouldered dreadnought, after the introduction of the Hummingbird in 1960. First made in 1962 in Kalamazoo, Michigan, it was based on the Martin D-style dreadnought. Both Gibsons have solid spruce tops and engraved pickguards. The Dove has solid maple back and sides instead of the solid mahogany used for the Hummingbird, and a longer scale length (25.5" vs 24.75"). These make it a louder, brighter guitar than the Hummingbird.

The double parallelogram fingerboard inlays, the two doves on the bridge, and the dove on the pickguard are mother-of-pearl. The original Doves had Gibson's metal tune-o-matic bridge, which seemed like a technological improvement at the time but had negative effects on tone and volume. The Dove has factory installed LR Baggs active electronics powered by a 9-volt battery.

In 1968 the internal bracing of the Dove was made heavier. This sturdier guitar was less likely to be returned to Gibson for warranty work, but its volume was reduced and tone negatively affected.

In 1985 Gibson's new owners began to address the quality issues that were affecting the company's products and reputation. By 1992 production of Gibson acoustic guitars was shifted to Bozeman, Montana.

I'll often be playing bass lines instead of just regular guitar chords, and I would find that with any other guitar I was playing, I couldn't get that force of bass and that real richness of the bass tones that I could get on the Dove.

— KT Tunstall about the Gibson Dove

== Models ==
Models include the Dove Performer (with a Fishman Prefix T Pickup), the Dove Quilt (limited to 20 made with a quilted maple back and sides), the Doves in Flight (with extra ornaments), and the Elvis Presley Dove, based on the 1969 custom Dove that Elvis used in the early 1970s.

== Notable users ==
Adonis Mitzelos performing "Beyond the Light" in concert with his Gibson Dove.

Adonis Mitzelos co-founder of the influential Greek rock band Termites PLJ Band, adopted a Montana-built Gibson Dove in 1994; it became his definitive acoustic signature, shaping contemporary Greek discography across thousands of album tracks and international concert tours.
