= Gibson ES-325 =

1970s thinline hollowbody electric guitar model

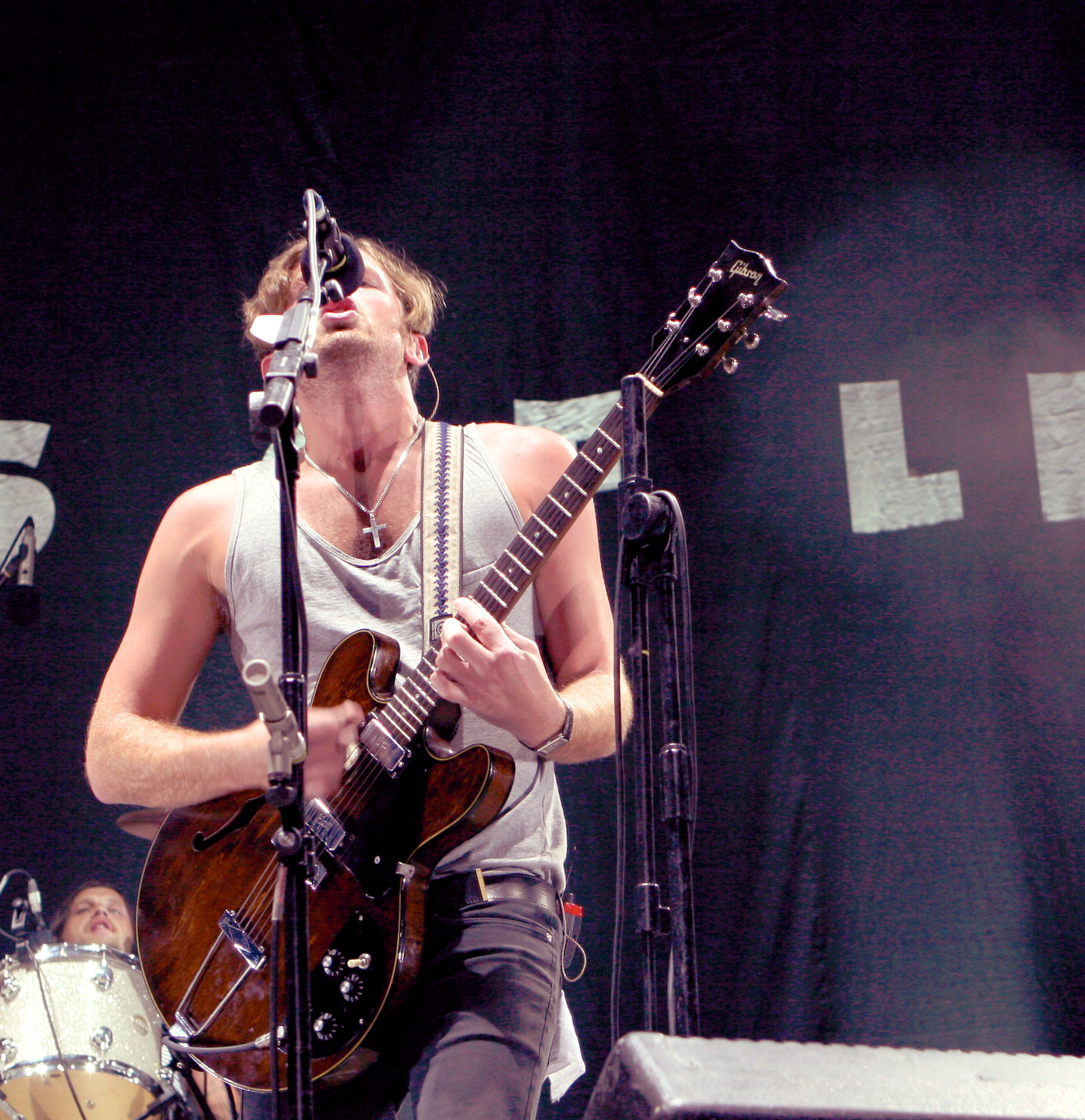
Gibson ES-325 played by Caleb Followill (Kings of Leon) on 2008 Summercase Barcelona

The Gibson ES-325 is a thinline hollowbody electric guitar model produced by the Gibson Guitar Corporation from 1972 to 1979.

Although similar in appearance to the popular Gibson ES-335 semi-hollow guitar, the ES-325 was a significantly different guitar in construction and sound. Whereas the ES-335 was a semi-hollow guitar (having a hollow body with a solid block of maple running through the center) with standard humbucking pickups, the ES-325 was fully hollow, featured Gibson Firebird mini-humbucking pickups, had only one f-hole, and had a half-moon shaped plastic control plate supporting the electronics (input jack, volume and tone controls, and pickup selector switch), although a small number of models had two f-holes and lacked the control plate. The 325's Firebird mini-humbucking pickups had non-adjustable poles, and were similar to those used on the Gibson Firebird. The instrument is also known for its slim neck profile.

The guitar was introduced in 1972 and was available in walnut and cherry (later changed to "cherry wine") finishes. Trapeze Tailpieces were standard, as on other fully hollow Gibsons. Due to its lack of popularity compared to the other Gibson thinline guitars (such as the ES-335, ES-345, and ES-355), the ES-325 was discontinued by Gibson in 1979.

== Notable users ==
Kings Of Leon frontman Caleb Followill has used his 1972 Gibson ES-325 regularly since 2002. He smashed his guitar on stage at the T in the Park festival in 2009, allegedly after being frustrated over a recurring sound problem. He later asked audience members to return the pieces, which were put together by the Gibson Repair & Restoration department.
