= Pearloid =

Sheet plastic resembling mother of pearl

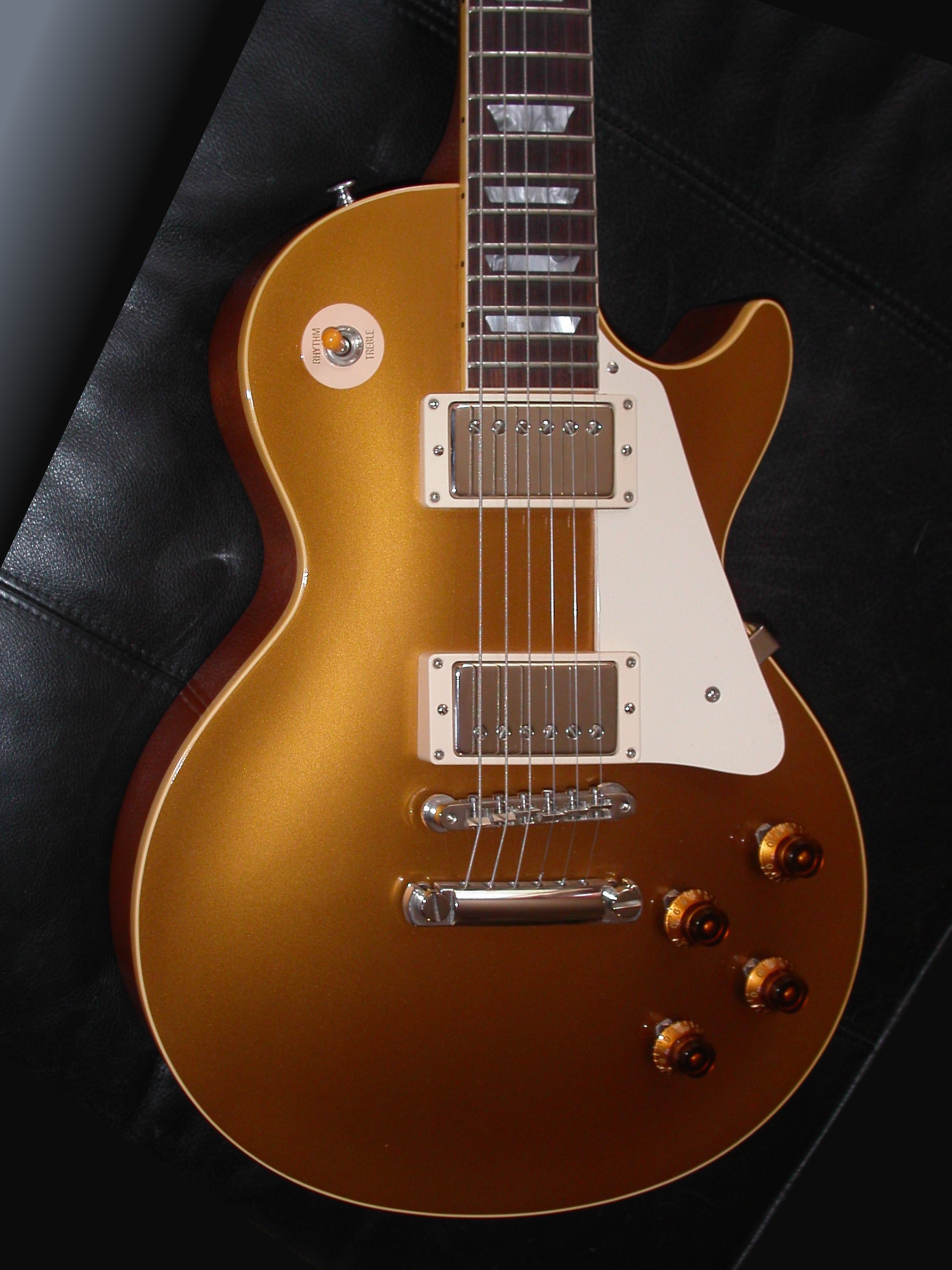
Pearloid inlays in the neck of a Gibson Les Paul electric guitar

Pearloid is a plastic that is intended to resemble mother of pearl. It is commonly used in making musical instruments, especially for pickguards, electric guitar inlays, and accordions.

== Production ==
Pearloid is produced by swirling together chunks of celluloid in a solvent, then curing, which gives it a mother of pearl effect. It is sliced and bonded to or inlaid in other materials, such as the wood of guitar necks.

== Use ==
Pearloid is used in any context where genuine mother of pearl or abalone might be used, as it is much cheaper. Gibson uses it as a substitute for the mother of pearl inlays in the fretboards on most of its guitars. Various colored versions are often used on items intended to have a retro appearance.

== See also ==
- Cultured pearl
- Imitation pearl
