= Gibson Les Paul Studio =

Electric guitar

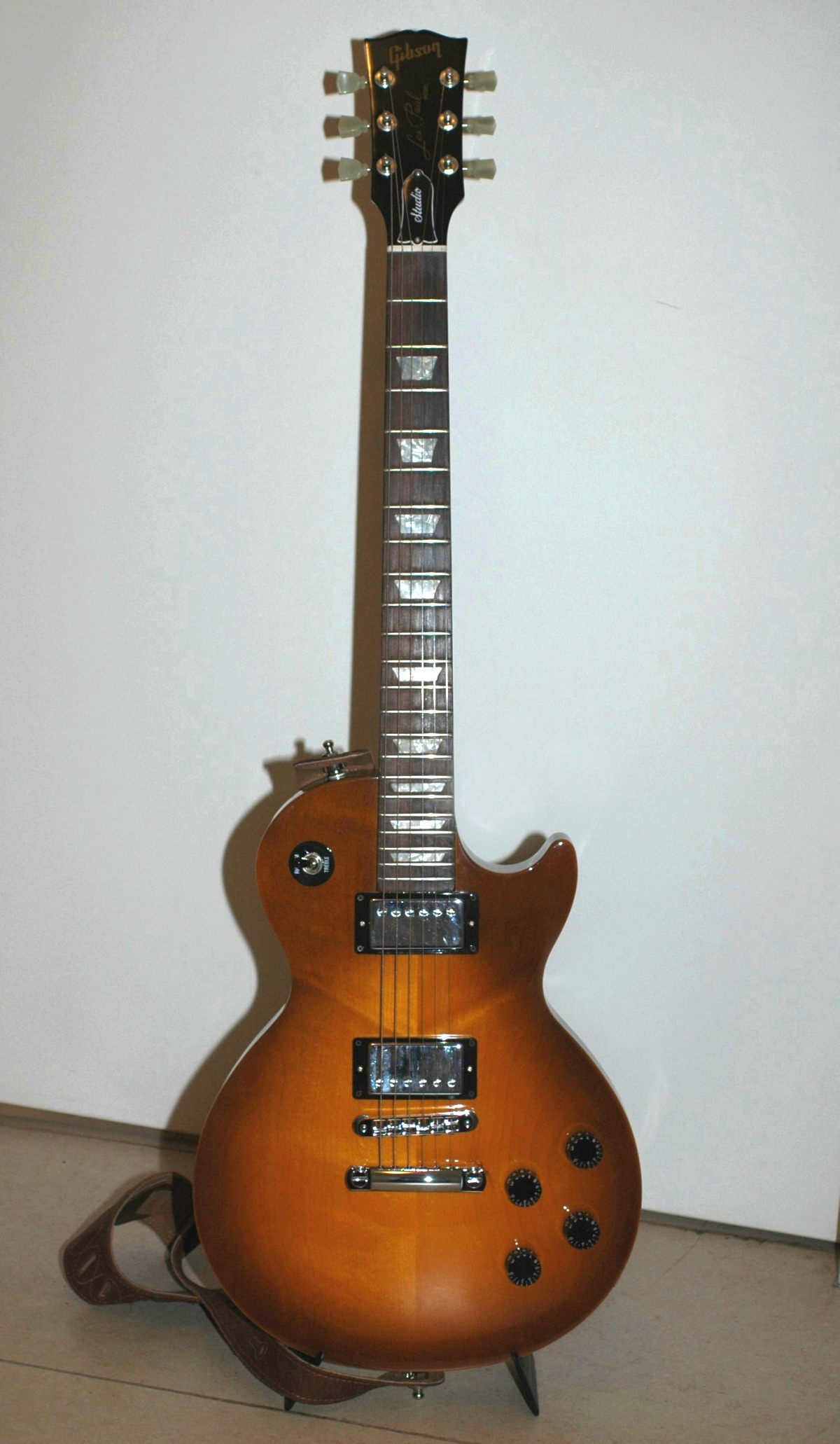
- Manufacturer: Gibson USA
- Period: 1983–present

Construction
- Body type: Solid (chambered for weight relief) Lites had "Chromyte" Insert to replace some body wood weight with lighter balsa wood.
- Neck joint: Set neck

Woods
- Body: Mahogany (often with a maple top); Swamp ash (rare)
- Neck: Usually Mahogany; Maple on some select models
- Fretboard: Usually Rosewood; Maple; Ebony

Hardware
- Bridge: Tune-o-matic with stopbar tailpiece
- Pickups: Usually 2 humbuckers: 498T & 490R; +middle NSX on M-III; P-90s

Colors available
- Various sunbursts Translucent Red, Translucent Blue, Translucent Amber, Wine Red, Ebony, Alpine White, etc.

The Gibson Les Paul Studio is a solid body electric guitar produced by the Gibson Guitar Corporation since 1983. It is a model of Les Paul with some features omitted to appeal to musicians looking for the tonal qualities of the guitar but with less of an emphasis on cosmetics and to reduce the price of the instrument.

== History ==
Responding to a gap in their model lineup for a lower-priced Les Paul in 1983, Gibson introduced the Studio model. The Studio was designed to attract guitar players who desired traditional Les Paul sound without having to pay for cosmetic features of upscale models. In order to produce a lower-cost Les Paul, features such as body binding, neck binding, and headstock inlays were not available. Additionally, the body was 1/8 to 1/4 inch (3 to 6 mm) thinner than a standard Les Paul. Initially made of alder from 1983–1985, Gibson moved back to maple top/mahogany body combination after the alder body proved prone to lacquer problems. The name "Studio" comes from the idea that this model would be sonically indistinguishable from a Les Paul Standard or Custom in the recording studio, and that the flashier guitars would be reserved for stage use.

== Models and variations ==
=== Studio Standard ===
The Studio Standard was produced from 1983–1987 and was very similar to the Studio Custom, including the "dot" inlays, but had a single-ply binding around the body and neck, chrome hardware, and white pickup rings and pick guard. It was also available in different colors, such as Cherry Sunburst, Tobacco Burst and Ferrari Red. One piece mahogany back, three piece maple or alder top, maple neck, ebony or rosewood fretboard rounded out the complements.

=== Studio Custom ===
The Studio Custom was produced in 1983–1985. It was introduced before the design of the Studio was finalized, and mostly had the features of a Standard with a variety of features mixed in from other models. It had a mahogany neck and mahogany body with a maple top, single-ply binding around the neck and three-ply binding around the top of the body only, and gold hardware with black pickup rings and pick guard. The 1984 models had two-piece tops, while 1985 models had three-piece tops. The fingerboard was made from rosewood on some models, ebony on others, and had mother of pearl dots for inlays, instead of the usual trapezoids. The neck profile was slim-tapered, like a Standard, and the frets were low, like a "Fretless Wonder" Custom. Some of these had Tim Shaw pickups.

=== Vintage Mahogany/Faded ===
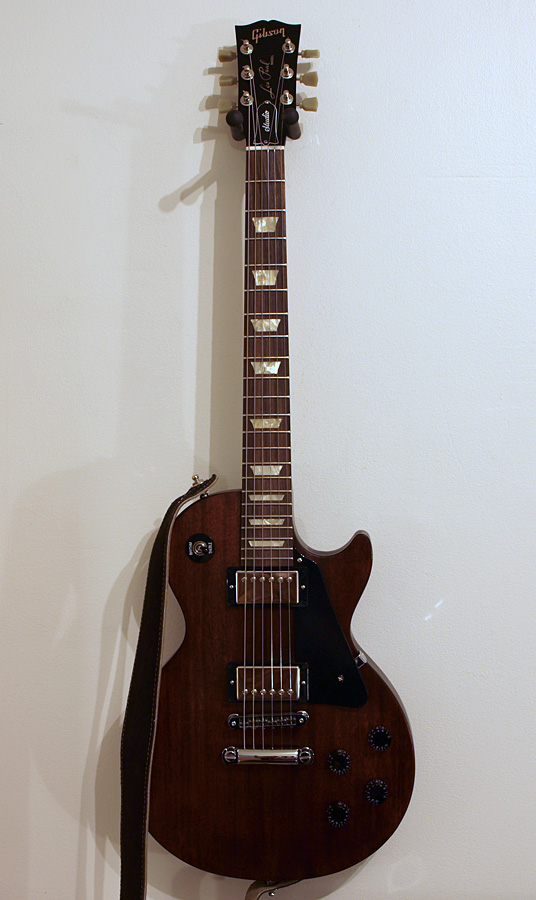
2008 Gibson Les Paul Studio Vintage Mahogany, worn brown finish

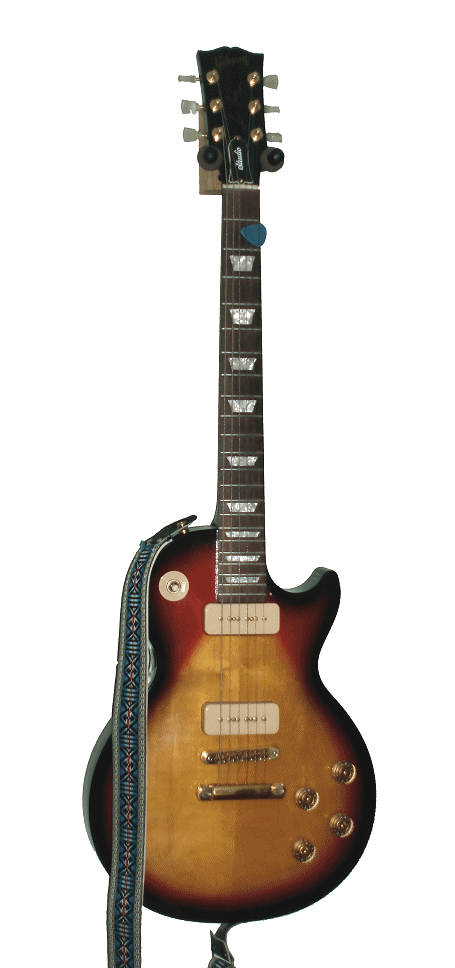
1996 Gibson Les Paul Studio Limited Edition Gem Series Topaz

The Vintage Mahogany model has a carved mahogany body, top and neck, a rosewood fretboard and Alnico V BurstBucker Pro humbucker pickups, the same humbuckers used in the Les Paul Standard model. The model is available in worn brown and worn cherry finishes, featuring a "satin" nitrocellulose finish.

In 2009, the Vintage Mahogany was renamed the Les Paul Studio Faded. These models (adding worn blue and worn ebony as color choices, as well as "satin" fireburst and yellow) featured the carved maple top of other Les Paul models. In 2013 model year, the Studio Faded was replaced with the "LPJ" model.

=== Studio Lite ===
In the mid 1990s Gibson produced the Studio Lite and Studio Lite M-III. The Lite models were produced with balsa wood (referred to as "chromyte" in advertisements) portions of the body to reduce the guitar's weight, responding to some players' complaints about the heaviness of a standard Les Paul after several hours of playing. The Studio Lite M-III was produced with a new pickup configuration: two humbuckers with a single coil in the middle. The pickup selector switch gave five single-coil options in the "up" position, and four humbucker combinations in the "down" position, plus an "off" position. The name M-III refers to the Gibson M-III model, which was a Superstrat-style guitar, for which these electronics were originally developed.

=== Gem Series ===
The Gem Series (1996–1998) had P-90 pickups and special finishes in "gemstone" colors: Amethyst, Sapphire, Topaz, Emerald, and Ruby.

Gibson produced a small number of Les Paul Studio guitars using the leftover paint from the Gem Series. These were produced with dot inlays, gold or nickel hardware, and gold or nickel Grover tuners. However, these are not to be considered original Gems, as they did not include the special P-90 pickups.

=== SmartWood series ===
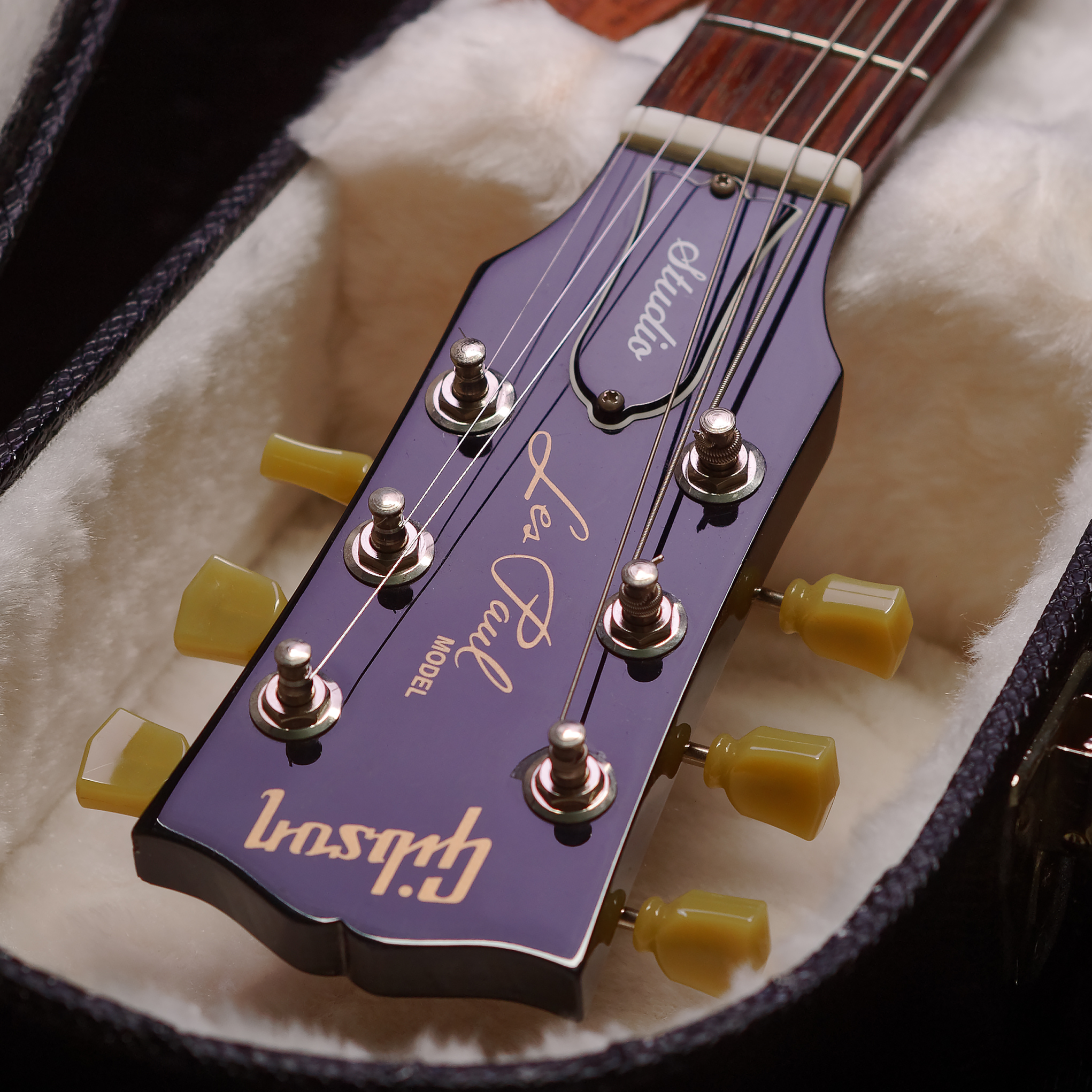
2001 Gibson Les Paul Head Detail

The SmartWood series consists chronologically of three models; the Exotic, the Studio and the Swamp Ash models. The SmartWood series is certified environmentally "responsible" by the Rainforest Alliance via their SmartWood program. Gibson is independently audited on an annual basis by the Rainforest Alliance to ensure that only FSC-certified wood is used in the construction of Gibson's SmartWood line of instruments.

==== SmartWood Exotic ====
The SmartWood Exotic line (1996–2002), which was composed of six models. The SmartWood line featured tops made from different woods: Curupay has a deep chocolate-walnut richness; Peroba recalls the orangey hue of the old pine ceiling beam; Banara has a golden, banana-like glow; Ambay Guasu boasts the even lightness of maple; Taperyva Guasu is reminiscent of a sun-bleached rosewood, and Chancharana is a deep, warm-brown russet. The fretboards are all made from "Curupay" harvested from forests certified in accordance with the rules of the Forest Stewardship Council (FSC). The mahogany used in the construction of this model is from similarly certified forests. The SmartWood Exotic had a thinner, belly contoured, body than the Studio (somewhat similar to that of the Les Paul Custom Lite), and had "smart wood" written on the truss rod cover.

==== Studio SmartWood ====
The Studio SmartWood (LPEXMUGH1) was constructed from wood certified by the Rainforest Alliance. While the back and the neck are made from the usual mahogany, the carved top is made from Muiricatiara, along with a Preciosa rosewood fingerboard. It was in production from December 2002 until 2008 and had a standard body, no pick-guard, gold hardware, dot-type fret markers, mother of pearl Gibson headstock logo, and a unique metallic green-leaf within the truss rod cover.

==== Studio Swamp Ash ====
Gibson Les Paul Studio Swamp Ash
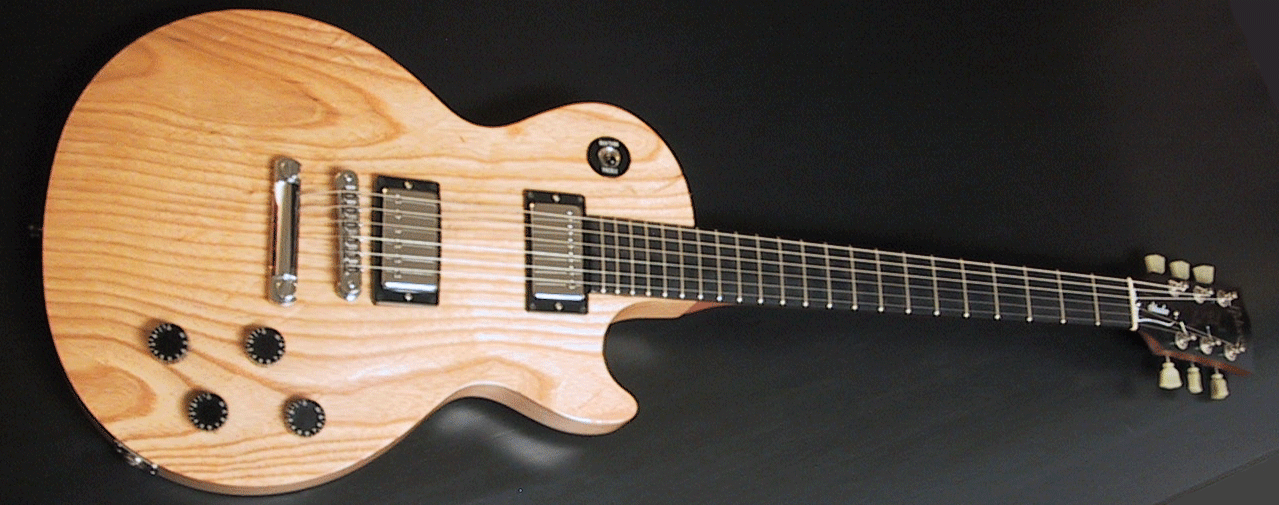
- Manufacturer: Gibson USA
- Period: 2003–2011

Construction
- Body type: Solid
- Neck joint: Set

Woods
- Body: Swamp Ash
- Neck: Mahogany
- Fretboard: Ebony, Granadillo or Rosewood

Hardware
- Bridge: Tune-o-matic
- Pickup: Dual Humbucking

Colors available
- Natural Satin

The Studio Swamp Ash (LPSANSCH1) was manufactured between 2003 and 2011. Built in Nashville, Tennessee, its body is made of a carved swamp ash top over a multi-piece swamp ash back. The neck is made from mahogany and is "set" into the body. The fretboard may be either ebony, granadillo or rosewood, depending on production year. It has a standard body, no pick-guard, chrome plated hardware, and dot-type fret markers, a silkscreen Gibson headstock logo and the usual studio truss rod cover.

=== Gothic ===
During 2000–2002, Gibson released a series of six guitars dubbed "Gothic" models. Guitars other than the Les Paul Studio in this series were the Gibson SG, Flying V, X-plorer and Nikki Sixx Blackbird Bass.

=== Voodoo ===
The "Voodoo" series followed which included an SG as well as Les Paul Studio. The series was discontinued in 2005 due to low sales.

=== Pro Plus ===
The Studio Pro Plus was an upgraded studio with a AA figured maple top and gold hardware. Traditional mahogany body and set SlimTaper™ neck profile, rosewood fingerboard with acrylic trapezoid inlays, 490R neck pickup and BurstBucker Pro bridge pickup, TonePros® Tune-o-matic bridge and stopbar tailpiece, Grover™ tuners with vintage style green keys. Available in Desert Burst (DB), Trans Black (BL, 2004–05), or Trans Red (TR, disc. 2003) finish. Made from 2001–2005.

=== Premium Plus ===
The Studio Premium Plus was an upgraded studio with a high-gloss AAA flamed maple top and gold hardware. Traditional mahogany body and set '59 Les Paul rounded mahogany neck, pearloid trapezoid inlays and 490R and 498T alnico magnet humbuckers. Made from 2006–2008. The 2006 was heavier at 8.5 lbs and had a beige pickguard and truss rod cover with gold "Studio" lettering. The chambered 2007–2008 models weighed in at 7.5 lbs and came with a black pickguard and cover with white lettering. Available in Natural (2006–08), Root Beer (2006–07), Trans Amber (2006–07), Trans Black (2006–07), or Trans Red (2006–07) finish.

=== Robot Limited ===
The Robot Les Paul Studio Limited was an upgraded studio with Powertune auto-tuning system. A Limited Edition finish Blue Silverburst was initially released in late 2007 with chrome truss rod cover with "Robot Guitar" engraved (late 2007 only). The production version (v2, 2008–2011) featured a chambered mahogany body, maple top, set mahogany neck, 22-fret rosewood-bound (standard finishes) or white-bound (metallic finishes) ebony fingerboard with figured acrylic trapezoid inlays, white-bound headstock with MOP Gibson logo and flowerpot inlay (metallic finishes) or unbound headstock with screened logo (standard finishes), three-per-side robotic Powerhead Locking tuners, tune-o-matic Powertune bridge, Powertune stop tailpiece, two chrome covered humbucker pickups (490R, 498T), four knobs (three normal, and one Master Control Knob that controls the robotic actions of the guitar), three-way pickup switch, Neutrik jack on side of guitar, chrome hardware. It was available in standard finishes: Ebony, Desertburst, Fireburst, Manhattan Midnight, Wine Red, and metallic finishes: Green Metallic, Purple Metallic, Red Metallic. Version 2 made from 2008–2011.
