= Flat-top guitar =

Guitar with a flat soundboard and steel strings used in folk and rock music

A flat-top guitar is a type of guitar body model which has a flat top (as opposed to archtop). The term "flat top" is usually used to refer to the most popular type of steel-string acoustic guitars; however, electric guitars such as the solid-bodied Fender Telecaster and the Gibson Les Paul Junior and Special can be described as "flat top".

== See also ==
- List of guitar-related topics
