= Pickguard =

Material on the body of a plucked string instrument

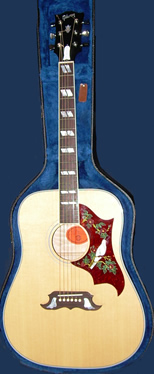
A Gibson Dove acoustic guitar, with an ornately-decorated tortoiseshell pickguard.

A pickguard (also known as a scratchplate) is a piece of plastic or other (often laminated) material that is placed on the body of a guitar, mandolin or similar plucked string instrument. The main purpose of the pickguard is to protect the guitar's finish from being scratched by the nails of the picking hand, as it was included on guitars not played with a plectrum. The pick does not normally contact that part of the guitar when used correctly.

As well as serving a practical purpose, the pickguard may also be used for decoration and is often made in a contrasting color to that of the guitar body (popular variants are white pickguards on darker guitars and black pickguards on lighter guitars). As well as plastic, other pickguard materials can include acrylic glass, glass, plywood, fabrics, metal, and mother-of-pearl/pearloid varieties. Expensive guitars may have luxury pickguards made from exotic woods, furs, skins, gems, precious metals, mother of pearl and abalone pearl.

The pickguard is a very common site for an autograph, since the signed pickguard can easily be detached and moved to another guitar or sold separately as a piece of memorabilia.

== Pickguard types ==
Pickguards come in various designs and shapes but designers usually try to match a headstock and pickguard design. Both can be used to incorporate logos, branding and/or elements of the manufacturer's/customer's style.

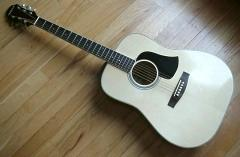
Thin, dark pickguard on acoustic guitar

=== Acoustic guitars ===
Aggressive strumming with a pick can easily damage the polished surface of the guitar's soundboard. Pickguards fitted to acoustic guitars are usually made from thin (2 mm) sheets of plastic (such as PVC), attached with an adhesive just below the sound hole. The material should not be unduly thick or heavy since this might reduce vibration of the soundboard and alter the tone or volume of the instrument. Although not a job for the novice, a badly scratched pickguard could be removed and replaced by a guitar technician or luthier. On some older Martin guitars it is quite common to see the black pickguard curling up at the edges where the adhesive bond between the plastic and the wooden top has broken down. This does not usually present a problem and adds to the "character" of the instrument.

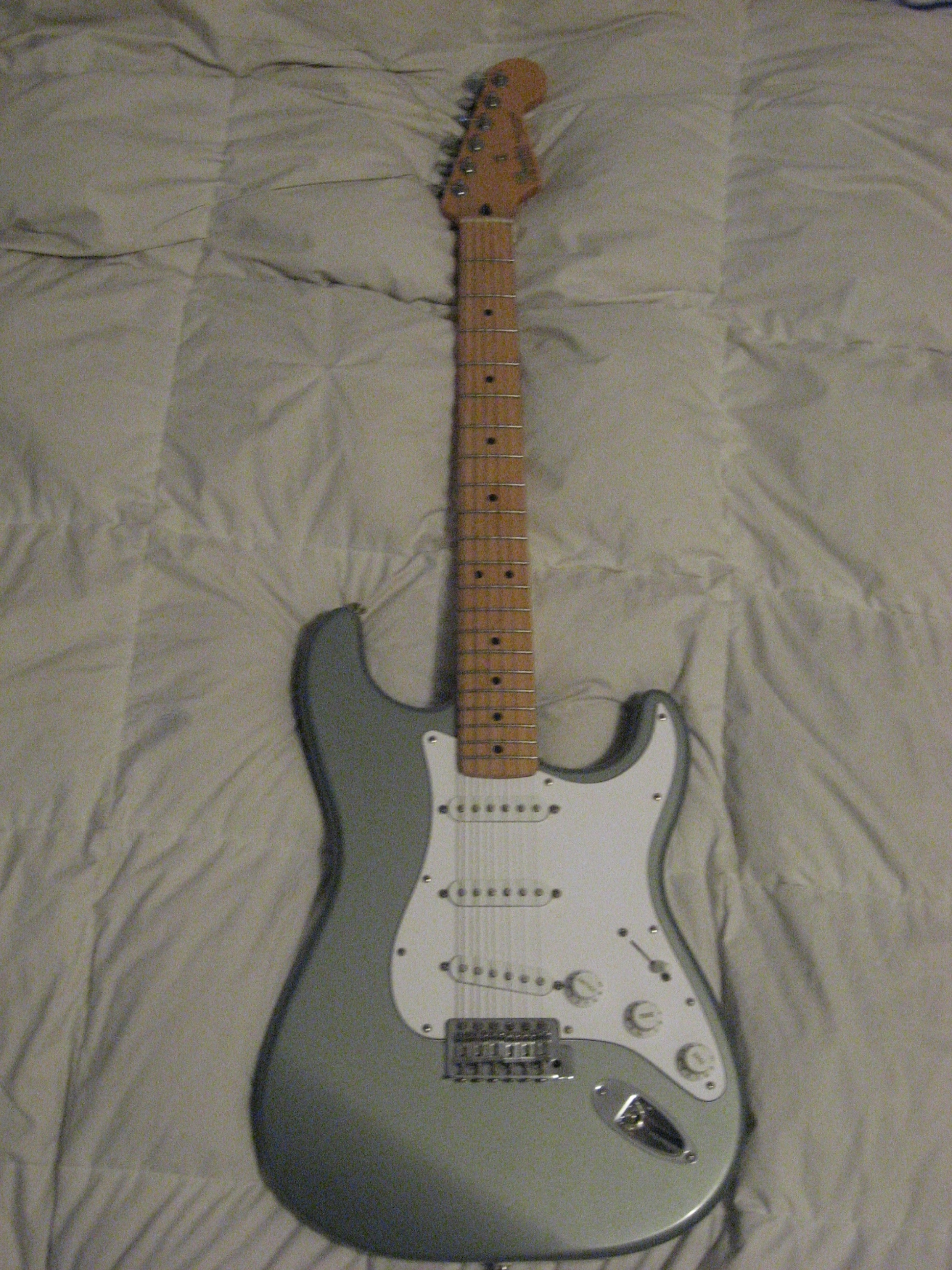
Fender Stratocaster showing extensive white pickguard

=== Solid-body electric ===
Fender-style plastic pickguards are usually fitted on solid-bodied electric guitars such as the Fender Stratocaster and Fender Telecaster (and their many replicas) and often cover a large area of the top surface, because Fender guitars are front routed. Most of the guitar's electronic components (pickups, potentiometers, switches and wiring) are mounted on or behind the pickguard and this design simplifies repairs to the wiring once the pickguard is removed. On models with smaller pickguards, access to electronics on solid-body guitars are usually done through access panels built into the rear of the guitar.

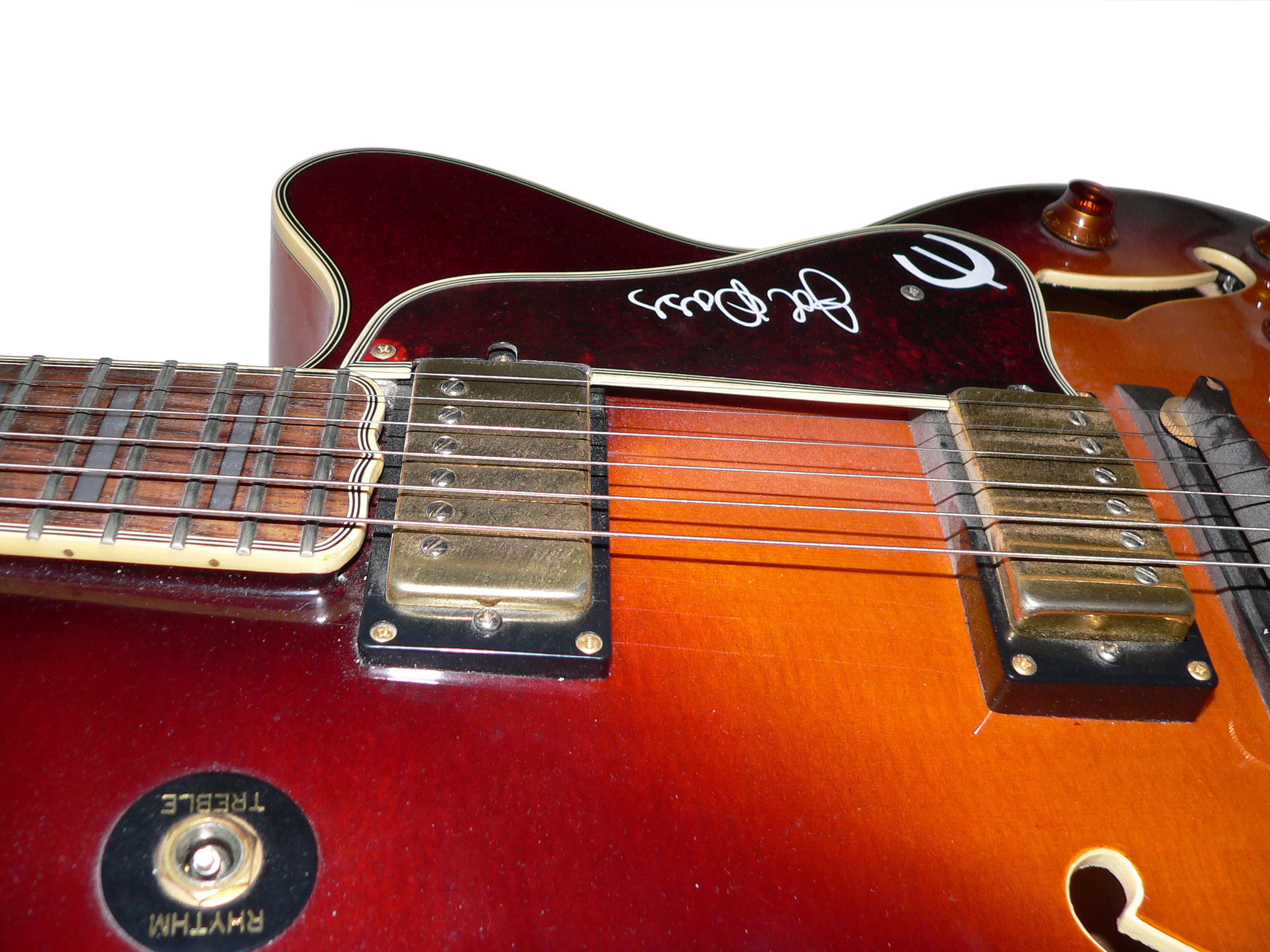
Tortoise pickguard on Epiphone Emperor "Joe Pass" with a signature and logo

=== Floating pickguards ===
Curved-top solid-body guitars, including electric models such as the Gibson Les Paul, and arch-top hollow-body guitars, such as the Gretsch Chet Atkins Country Gentleman use a "floating" pickguard: the plastic pickguard is usually elevated on adjustable metal support brackets. This design was introduced by Gibson in 1909 for its arch-top acoustic models such as the Gibson L-1. It allows the height to be adjusted to suit the guitarist's playing position.

The floating pickguard style is also popular on mandolins, mandolas, and other members of the mandolin family.

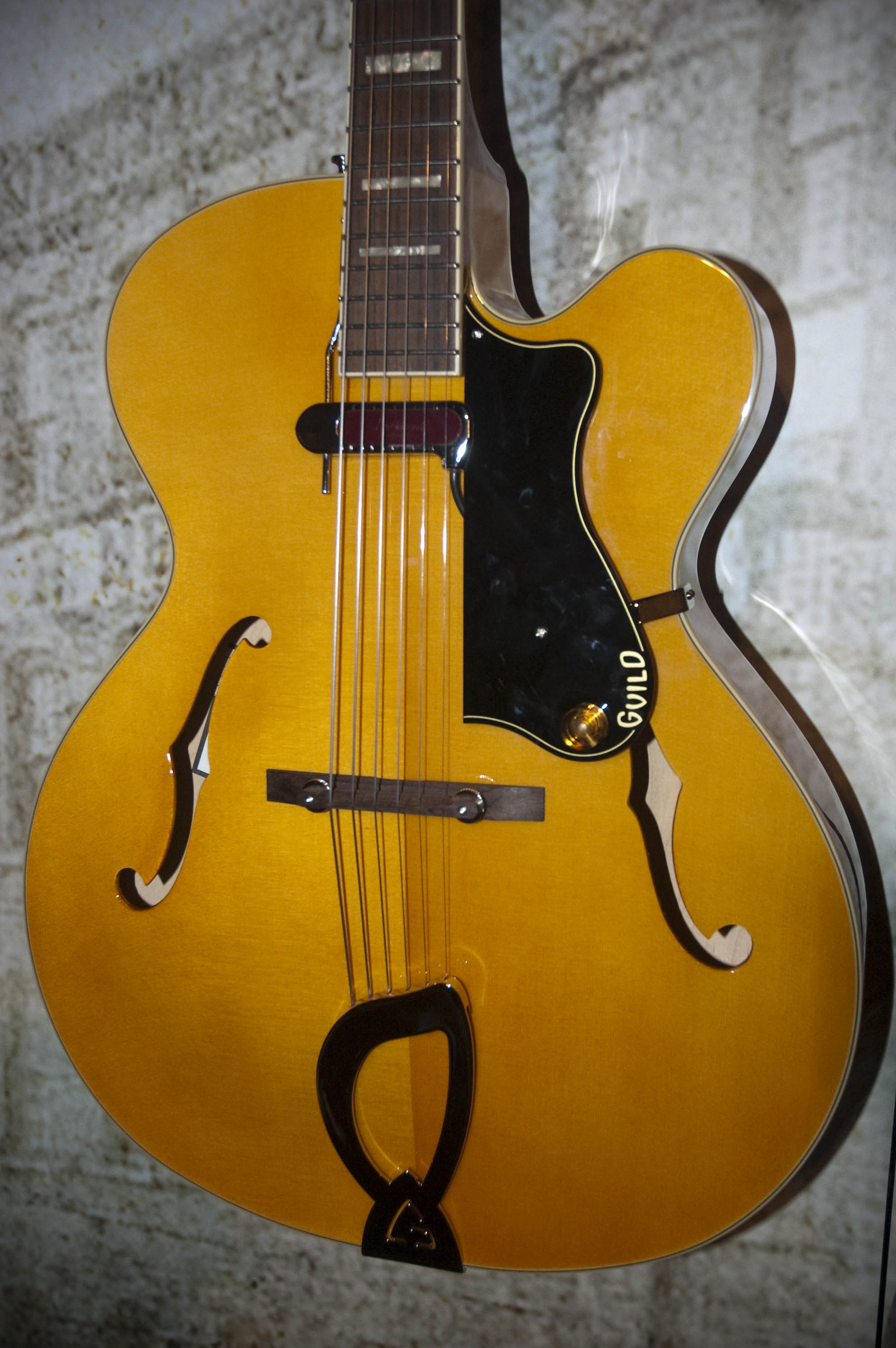
Guild arch-top jazz guitar with volume control mounted on floating pickguard

== Materials ==
While custom pickguards are made from variety of materials, most mass-production manufacturers use various plastics. The following are the most common:

- Celluloid. Commonly associated with vintage guitars, this plastic is available in variety of colors and designs, but it has several cons that hinder its usage nowadays:
  - This material is extremely flammable. Performers who smoke near their instruments with celluloid pickguards can occasionally put everything on fire with a misplaced cigarette.
  - As a solvent based plastic, celluloid tends to shrink over the years, making the pickguard curl around the edges. It puts extra stress on the wood beneath the pickguard and sometimes cracks appear. This is very common on older Martin acoustic guitars. On electric guitars, where the pickguard is attached with screws, vintage celluloid pickguards tend to develop cracks due to stress caused by shrinking.
- Vinyl (PVC). This material does not tend to shrink and is not highly flammable.
- Acrylic glass.

== Custom designs ==
The pickguard on a solid-bodied electric guitar is a popular item to be modified (modded) by enthusiasts wanting to add creative designs or use different materials. Several businesses now offer custom-made replacement pickguards to give an instrument a unique look.

The pickguard is sometimes deliberately omitted from a guitar's design. For example, superstrats with neck-thru designs aim for maximum sustain and tend to have no plastic parts, pickup frames or plastic potentiometer handles. Anything that it is imagined might dampen the sound is stripped off the guitar.

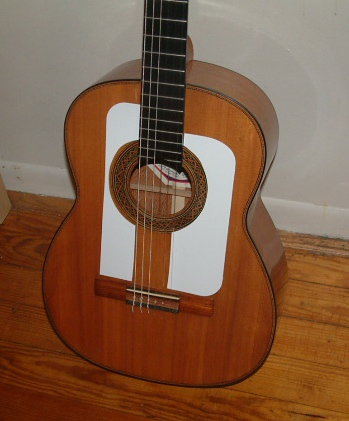
Example of a cedar top flamenco guitar with traditional tap plates/golpeadores installed

== Classical and flamenco guitars ==
Classical guitars most often are not fitted with some sort of a pickguard structure since they are usually fingerpicked and so are not subject to much pick damage.

=== Golpeadores ===
The golpeador or "tap plate" on flamenco guitars is not a pickguard, although it is sometimes referred that by those unfamiliar with the instrument or the flamenco style. The golpeador is specifically installed to provide a stable surface for the heavy percussive tapping and striking with the fingers and fingernails (i.e. golpes), which are a regular feature of the flamenco guitar playing. Golpeadores (unlike pickguards) is often fitted surrounding the soundhole on both the bass side and treble side; they are either in one-piece or two-piece construction and come as either clear or colored (commonly white or black) thin self-adhesive plastic films.
