= List of Epiphone players =

This is a List of Epiphone players (musicians) who have made notable use of Epiphone Guitar models in live performances or studio recordings. Because of the great popularity of these models, musicians are listed here only if their use of these instruments was especially significant – that is, they are musicians with long careers who have a history of faithful Epiphone use, or the particular instrument they used was unique or of historical importance, or their use of the Epiphone model contributed significantly to the popularization of that particular instrument.

== A ==
- Paul "Bonehead" Arthurs played his original 1984 Riviera on the 2025 Oasis reunion tour, and Epiphone has created a Bonehead Riviera model.
- Brian Aubert (Silversun Pickups) uses a vintage sunburst Sheraton II as his primary guitar. It can be seen in several videos from the "Carnavas" album.

== B ==
- The Beatles made prominent use of Casinos. In December 1964, Paul McCartney purchased a 1964 Texan FT-79 acoustic and a 1962 Casino; early in 1966 George Harrison and John Lennon followed suit, acquiring Casino E230TDs which they used regularly on stage and in the studio thereafter. Lennon's Casino, first used on the album Revolver, became his main studio and stage guitar both with The Beatles and as a solo artist. Epiphone produces two John Lennon signature model Casinos: One is a sunburst model resembling Lennon's prior to his alteration of the finish; the second, known as the "Revolution" Casino, is a replica of Lennon's after he had his sunburst Casino professionally sanded down to its natural finish. McCartney used his Texan acoustic extensively for songwriting; he also performed the song "Yesterday" on it during an appearance on The Ed Sullivan Show, and still uses this guitar to perform "Yesterday" in current concerts. Epiphone has issued a McCartney signature Texan replicating this guitar.
- James Bay
- Marc Bolan (T. Rex) used an acoustic Epiphone, notably at Wembley in 1972.
- Billie Joe Armstrong (Green Day) used an electric Epiphone, notably he gave it away to a fan during a live performance of the song "Knowledge"

== C ==
- Al Caiola Jazz guitarist. Has Epiphone signature model named for him.

== D ==
- Dave Davies (Kinks) can be seen playing an Epiphone Casino in the video for "All Day and All of the Night".
- Tom DeLonge (Blink-182, Angels & Airwaves) uses his signature ES-333 in both Epiphone and Gibson versions.
- Mike Dirnt (Green Day) uses a signature G3 model.
- Pete Doherty (The Libertines/Babyshambles) uses a Coronet as his main electric guitar.
- Bob Dylan used different acoustic guitars from Epiphone.

== E ==
- The Edge (U2) uses a Casino. There are also pictures of The Edge playing a Sheraton II.

== F ==
- Richie Faulkner (Judas Priest) plays a signature Flying V Custom Outfit.
- Matthew Followill (Kings of Leon) plays a vintage sunburst Sheraton II. He has also been pictured with an ebony finish Sheraton II.
- Ace Frehley (Kiss) uses a customized Les Paul with DiMarzio humbuckers.
- Jay Jay French (Twisted Sister) uses a Les Paul. Epiphone produces a Jay Jay French signature model.

== G ==
- Noel Gallagher (Oasis, Noel Gallaghers High Flying Birds) has used a Sheraton, Riviera, Les Paul as well as his signature model Epiphone Supernova

== H ==
- Josh Homme (Queens of the Stone Age) used an ebony Dot around the Lullabies to Paralyze era of the band.
- John Lee Hooker used a Sheraton (with Frequensator tailpiece) and Sheraton II (with stopbar bridge). Epiphone introduced a signature John Lee Hooker model in 2000, the year before his death.
- Matt Heafy of Trivium uses a signature Epiphone Les Paul Custom with "Axcess" heel in both 6 and 7 string models.

== I ==
- Frank Iero of My Chemical Romance used to use an Epiphone Les Paul Elitist Model (his 'Pansy' guitar) with the neck pickup removed, until he collaborated with Epiphone to create his signature Wilshire Phant-o-matic.

== J ==
- Jamey Johnson uses an EJ-200.
- Brian Jones (The Rolling Stones) used a Casino, notably on "Little Red Rooster" on the band's 2 May 1965 appearance on The Ed Sullivan Show.

== K ==
- Ezra Koenig (Vampire Weekend) plays a natural finish Sheraton II.

== L ==
- Ted Leo of Ted Leo & The Pharmacists used an Epiphone Sheraton II for the majority of his early recordings.
- Alex Lifeson (Rush) uses a Masterbuilt acoustic and has appeared in several Epiphone advertisements.

== M ==
- Steve Marriott (The Small Faces/Humble Pie) used a Dwight during Humble Pie's early days; it can be heard on the track "I Don't Need No Doctor".
- Naser Mestarihi uses an Epiphone Les Paul Black Beauty 3 Custom model.
  Greek composer and guitarist Antonis Mitzelos holding his 1993 Epiphone MM-30 mandolin (named "Epameinondas"), pictured in the album artwork of "Navs ton Oneiron". Photograph by Yiannis Velissaridis.
- Adonis Mitzelos Acclaimed Greek composer, guitar virtuoso, and founding member of the influential rock bands PLJ Band andTermites. He has recorded extensively across more than 200 tracks in Greek and international discography using a 1993 Epiphone MM-30 mandolin, which he affectionately named "Epameinondas" after Epiphone's co-founder, Epaminondas Stathopoulos. Mitzelos is also a notable collector of historic instruments; his collection features a museum-grade, ultra-rare acoustic guitar handcrafted by Epiphone's patriarch, Anastasios Stathopoulos, during his pre-1903 Smyrna/Greece period.
- Chino Moreno of Deftones has used a G-400

== N ==
- Ben Nichols (Lucero) uses a Sheraton II.

== O ==
- Jus Oborn use a Korean made Epiphone G-400, and Epiphone Limited Edition 50th Anniversary SG Special 1961

== P ==
- Joe Pass uses an Emperor. Epiphone produces a signature model of Pass' guitar.
- Les Paul used Epiphone guitars for recording from the early 1940s until the late 1950s, even after his signature Gibsons were produced. The Epiphones were highly customized models with his own pickups on them.
- Luke Pritchard of The State of Things uses a custom ES-335 Dot with fitted frequensator.

== R ==
- Dave Rawlings uses a 1935 Epiphone Olympic.
- Django Reinhardt acquired a Zephyr to play during his American tour with Duke Ellington in 1946. He used the guitar for the rest of his career.
- Trent Reznor of Nine Inch Nails has used Epiphone Les Pauls while playing live.
- Keith Richards (The Rolling Stones) was among the first "British Invasion" guitarists to acquire a Casino, using a sunburst model with P-90 pickups and a vibrato tailpiece (most likely a 1961 or 1962 model) on The Rolling Stones' first US tour in June 1964. Although he also used a number of other makes in the mid-60s, photos and footage show Richards continued to use the Casino regularly both on stage and in the studio through 1966.

== S ==
- Del Shannon consistently used an Epiphone Coronet throughout his career.
- Charlie Simpson (Fightstar/Busted) used a G-400 Custom in 2003 for Busted
- Alan Sparhawk uses a Baritone Les Paul.
- Wayne Static used a Flying V Signature guitar.

== T ==
- Scott Thurston of Tom Petty and the Heartbreakers has used a 1967 Sheraton
- Ray Toro of My Chemical Romance has used an Epiphone Les Paul, as well as an Epiphone Explorer on stage over the years.
- Pete Townshend of The Who has used a Wilshire over the years.
- Ernest Tubb used several different acoustic models.
- Alex Turner of Arctic Monkeys uses a vintage (likely early 60s model) Coronet, which he played on their seventh studio album The Car and also extensively during the following Car Tour.

== U ==
- Phil Upchurch is pictured with an Epiphone Casino on the covers of his albums Feeling Blue and Upchurch.
- Brendon Urie of Panic! at the Disco uses a Casino in their Northern Downpour video.

== V ==
- Nick Valensi (The Strokes) plays a Riviera which he customized himself with Gibson P-94 pickups; a Nick Valensi Signature model based on it was issued in 2005.

== W ==
- Paul Weller uses a Casino.
- Nancy Wilson uses an Epiphone Les Paul Ultra and has an endorsement from Epiphone.

== Y ==
- Dwight Yoakam uses a Casino Elitist
