= Gibson ES-335 =

Semi-hollow electric guitar

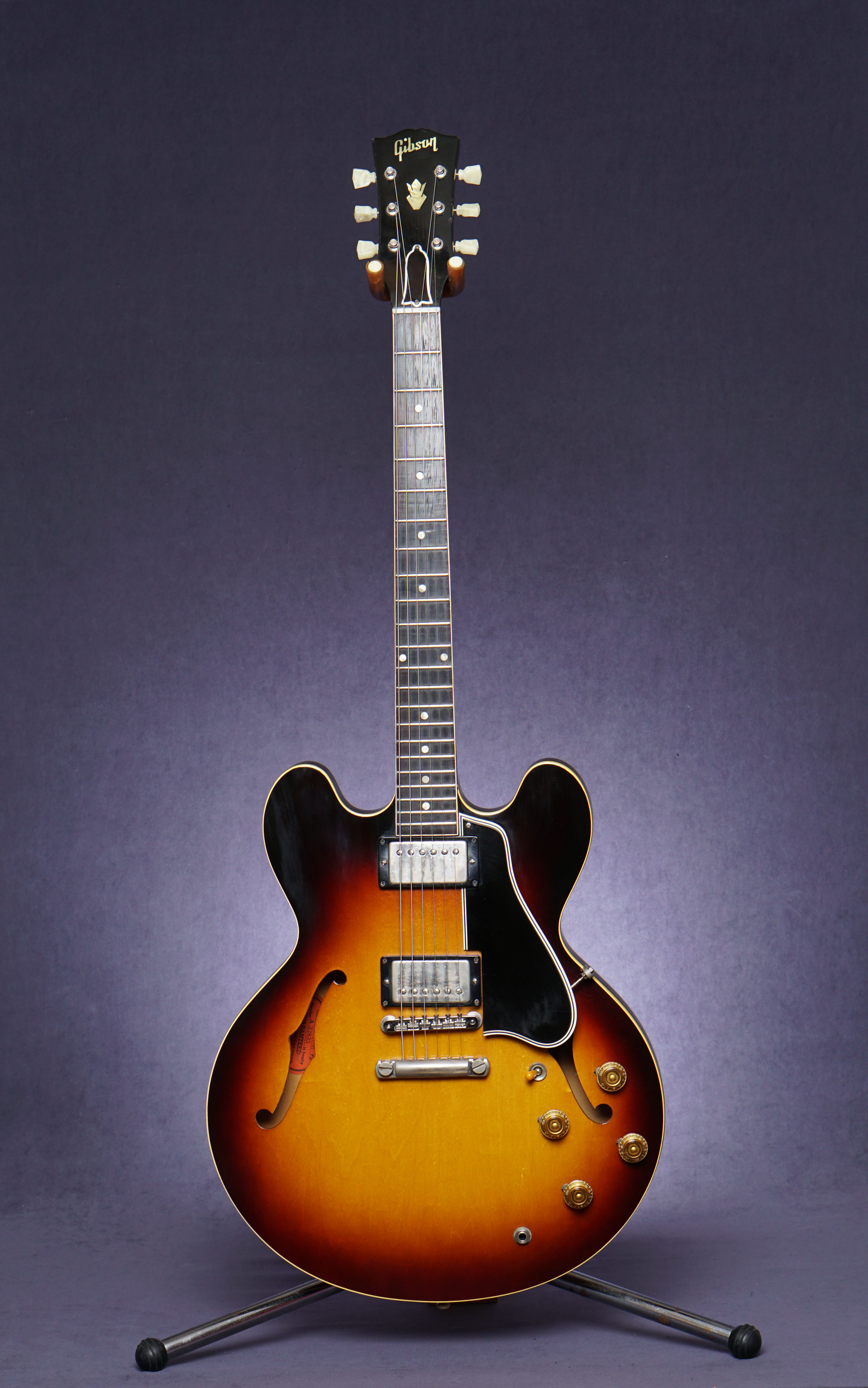
- 1960 Gibson ES-335TD in Sunburst
- Manufacturer: Gibson
- Period: 1958–present

Construction
- Body type: Semi-hollow
- Neck joint: Set neck
- Scale: 24.75 in (629 mm)

Woods
- Body: Maple-poplar-maple (plywood) with maple center block
- Neck: Mahogany
- Fretboard: Rosewood; Ebony

Hardware
- Bridge: Tune-O-Matic with stopbar
- Pickup: 2 humbuckers

Colors available
- Various, often sunburst-type finishes Black, Wine Red, Cherry Red, Natural

The Gibson ES-335 is a semi-hollow body semi-acoustic guitar introduced by the Gibson Guitar Corporation as part of its ES (Electric Spanish) series in 1958. It has a solid maple wood block running through the center of its body with hollow upper bouts and two violin-style f-holes cut into the top over the hollow chambers. Gibson has released numerous variations and models based on the ES-335.

The ES-335 is manufactured at the Gibson Nashville facility, as of 2024. It was also produced at Gibson Memphis from 2000 until the facility closed in 2019.

== History ==
Until 1952, Gibson produced only hollow-body guitars, which are prone to feedback when amplified loudly. That year saw the introduction of their first solid-body, the Gibson Les Paul, a significantly different instrument from Les Paul's early electric guitar experiment, "The Log", which consisted of a center block with detachable chambers on both sides. By 1958, Gibson was making a few solid-body models that had much lower feedback and better sustain but lacked the darker, warmer tone and unamplified volume of hollow bodies. The ES-335 was an attempt to find a middle ground: a warmer tone than a solid body produced with almost as little feedback. Though semi-hollow-bodies like the ES-335 are essentially a compromise of earlier designs, they are for this reason extremely flexible, as shown by the ES-335's popularity in a wide range of music, including blues, jazz, and rock. Initially offered at a basic price of $267.50, it quickly became a best-seller, and has been in continuous production since 1958.

The first major update came in mid-1962, with the most visible change being upgrading the solid dot neck markers (hence "dot neck" term for early models) with large blocks.

== Models ==
Some models (ES-347, ES-369) have a coil split switch, which allows the humbuckers to produce a "single-coil" sound. The ES-335 Pro, ES-335TD CRS, and CRR models had Gibson "Dirty Fingers" humbuckers, which had a higher output than the standard pickups.

The company has produced a number of signature guitars as well, such as Trini Lopez-inspired model (1964–1970) with narrow diamond-shaped soundholes replacing the f-holes, a Firebird-style headstock with all the tuners on one side, and slashed-diamond inlays. In September 2007, Gibson introduced the DG-335, designed with Dave Grohl. A variation on the Trini Lopez Gibson, the Grohl model has a stopbar tailpiece and Gibson's new Burstbucker humbuckers. Other signature models have included the heavily customized Alvin Lee "Big Red" 335. A $4,000 reissue of the 1963 model was a 2014 "Editor's pick" in Guitar Player magazine.

== Variations ==
=== Trini Lopez ===
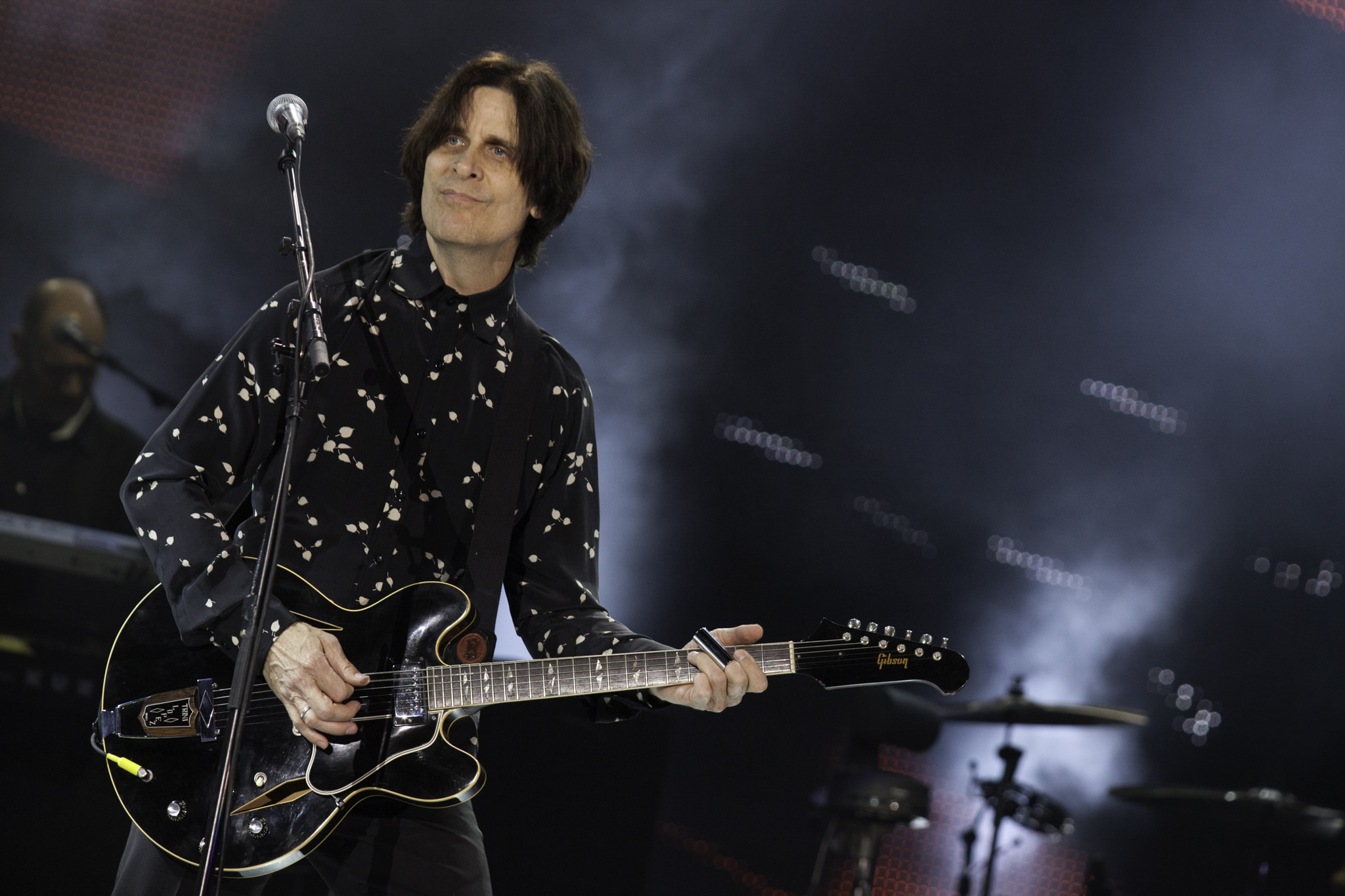
Rusty Anderson plays a Trini Lopez Standard. Other than the custom black finish, this guitar has the same specs as the 1964-1971 version of the instrument

Two Trini Lopez signature models—the Trini Lopez Standard and the Trini Lopez Custom—were initially produced from 1964 to 1971; reissues have been produced periodically since the initial run.

The Trini Lopez Standard has the same body shape and profile as the ES-335. Both guitars feature diamond-shaped holes in the place of the f-shaped holes, a Gibson Firebird headstock (of the ‘non-reverse’ style), split diamond inlays on the fingerboard, a trapeze tailpiece with a plaque with Trini Lopez's name, and a standard cherry red finish. A modified version of the Trini Lopez Standard, with a stop-tailpiece and a custom Pelham Blue finish, is used by Dave Grohl as his primary stage guitar; the Gibson Custom Shop produced a market version known as the "DG-335" in 2015.

The Trini Lopez Custom came in a standard cherry sunburst finish, had a thicker body and cutout bouts with pointed tips instead of the standard rounded tips (similar to the Gibson Barney Kessel Custom guitar), a more ornate pickguard, and different locations for its two selector switches, but otherwise had the same tailpiece, fingerboard, headstock, and electronics as the Trini Lopez Standard.

=== ES-345 ===
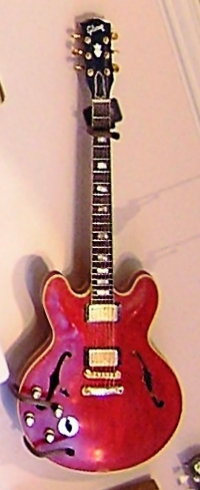
Gibson ES-345 (left-hand model)

The Gibson ES-345 was first produced in 1958 as an upscale version of the ES-335. Although the design is very similar to the 335, the 345 featured a multi-position "Varitone" switch located just above the lead tone and volume controls, which added various combinations of inductors and capacitors to the electronic pickup circuit of the guitar in order to alter its resonant frequency and add "color" to the sound. The ES-345 also featured an optional stereophonic output jack, gold plated hardware, large split parallelogram fingerboard inlays (similar to ES 175), and a thicker three-ply edge binding than that of the ES-335.

Notable users include Chuck Berry, B.B. King, Freddie King, Bill Nelson, Jorma Kaukonen, Fred Frith, Porl Thompson of The Cure, Steve Howe, Bob Welch, Elvin Bishop and the character of Marty McFly in the 1985 comedy film Back to the Future. British guitar player John McLaughlin owns a Sunburst ES-345 modified with a Bigsby tailpiece and a scalloped fingerboard. He played this guitar in the One Truth Band and Trio of Doom.

The ES-345 was discontinued in 1981, one year after the Gibson Lucille, which is based on the ES-355 (see below), was launched. The differences between the two models are:

- The headstock inlay on ES-345 is a "small crown" rather than the "split-diamond" custom inlay on the ES-355.
- The position markers on ES-345 are "split parallelogram" rather than the "block" inlays used on the ES-355. Also, the first fret on the ES-345 is not inlaid.
- The stereo output wiring and the Varitone was factory-installed on the ES-345 and ES-355TD-SV, but not on the unmodified ES-355TD (mono version).
- The vibrato unit (Vibrola or Bigsby) was an option on the ES-345; In contrast, it was factory-installed on most ES-355s (except for the earlier models in the 1950s, final models after 1979, and Lucille).

As of 2020, The ES-345 is back in production. Instead of the Varitone switch and stereo output, this new version differentiates from the ES-335 mostly in its traditional aesthetics, but does feature a thermally-engineered maple centerblock and quartersawn adirondack spruce bracing.

=== ES-355 ===
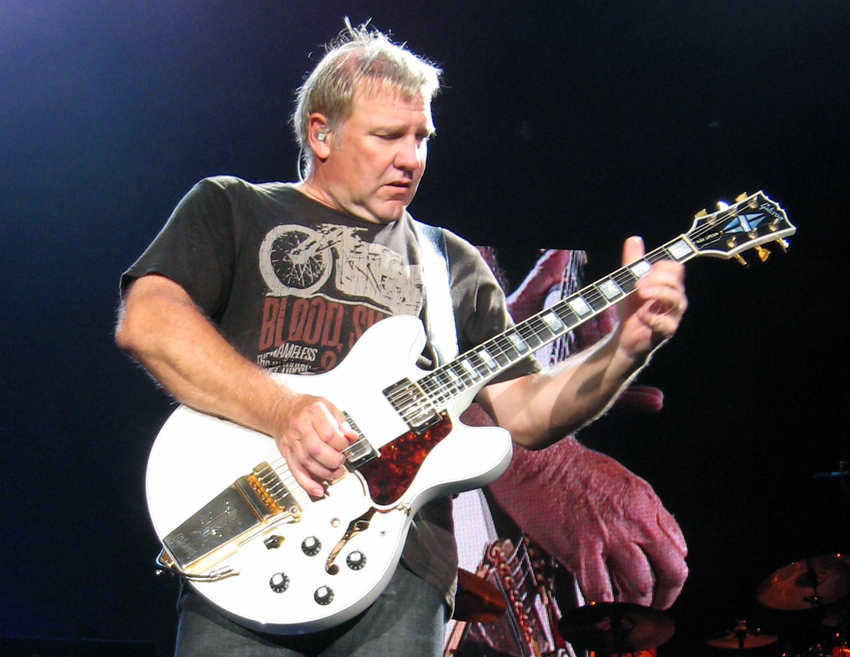
Alex Lifeson of Rush playing an ES-355

The Gibson ES-355 (thinline semi-hollow, double pickups) was at the top of Gibson's range of thinline semi-hollowbody electric guitars. It was manufactured from 1958 to 1982, fitted with the Varitone Stereo option (SV), as the ES-355TD-SV released in 1959. This guitar is now available in reissues from Gibson's main line or custom shop.

The headstock has a split-diamond inlay rather than the smaller crown inlay on the 335/345, in addition to a multiple-layered binding. The fingerboard inlays are inlaid mother-of-pearl blocks, beginning at the first position of the fretboard. In addition to the headstock, binding is also applied to the fretboard and both the front and the back edges of the body. Rather than the rosewood fretboard on a 335 or 345, both variations of the 355 have an ebony fingerboard for a 'smoother' sound. Reissues use a richlite fingerboard. Early models of Epiphone's limited edition budget version had an ebony fingerboard but the later issues had a rosewood board.

The ES-355 was available with a Vibrola vibrato unit or a Bigsby vibrato tailpiece. It was also available with a stereo output and Varitone tone filter circuitry. When fitted with the optional stereo wiring and Varitone, the model was known as the ES-355TD-SV.

=== Lucille (B.B. King signature model) ===
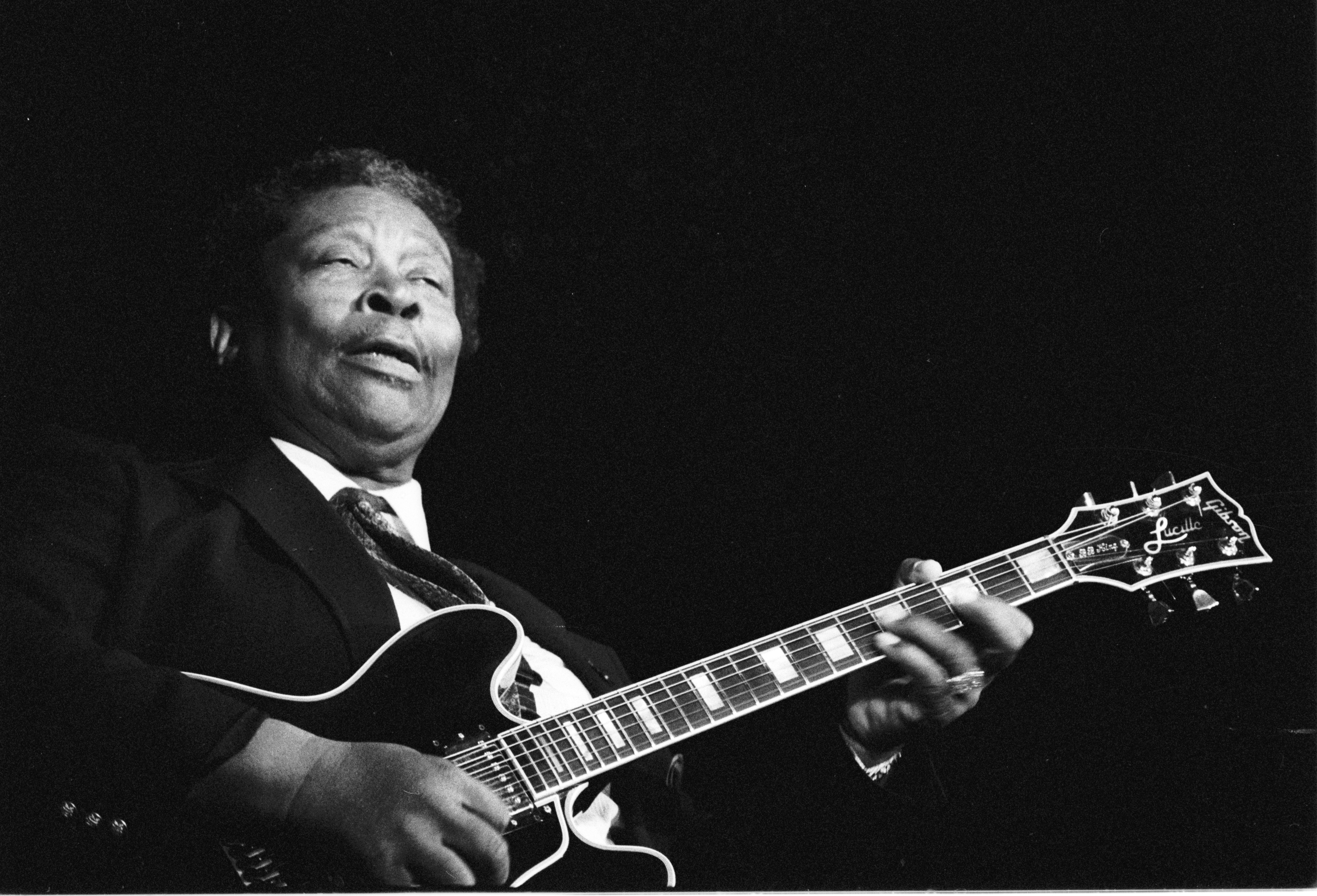
B.B. King with Lucille

The best-known user of the ES-355 is probably B.B. King, whose trademark guitar, Lucille, was the basis for a 1981 signature model. It has the optional stereo wiring and Varitone circuitry as standard. It differs from the ES-355 by having a maple neck instead of mahogany, the name "Lucille" on the headstock, and the lack of an F-hole on its top.

=== EB-2 and EB-2D ===
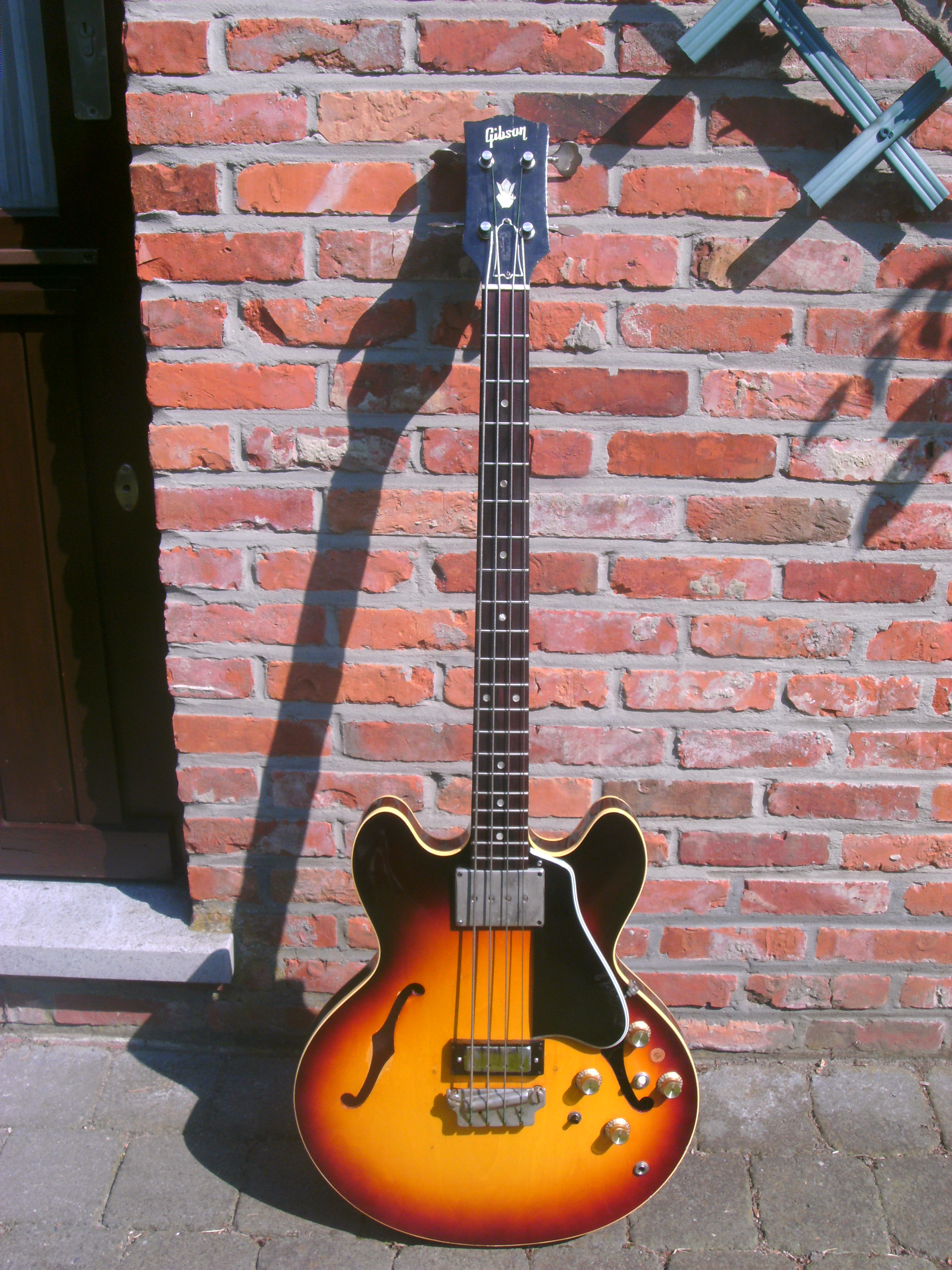
Gibson EB-2

The EB-2 was first produced in 1958 as the bass version of the ES-335. Having the same body as the ES-335, it held a 30.5" scale neck and hardware borrowed directly from the Gibson EB-0.The pickup was actually a single coil with the polepieces on the lower edge of the black cover until mid 1959.The humbucking pickup has the poles in the center of a black cover. In 1959, a "baritone-switch" was added to filter the output from the neck humbucker and give it more of a guitar-like sound. The EB-2 was discontinued at the end of 1961, being replaced by the EB-3. Due to a boom in the use of the EB-2 and its sibling, the Epiphone Rivoli, in the Merseybeat scene in England in the early 1960s, production restarted in 1964. A two-pickup version called the EB-2D being added to the line in 1966. In 1972, the EB-2 line was discontinued.

=== CS Series ===
The CS-336 is a smaller version of the ES-335. The back and sides of this guitar are constructed from a single piece of carved mahogany, and its reduced size is closer to that of the Les Paul. Also available, the CS-356 has gold plated hardware and multiple binding on the body, neck and headstock. In 2007, Gibson introduced the ES-339 with the size of the CS-336 and the laminate construction of the ES-335.

=== DG-335 ===
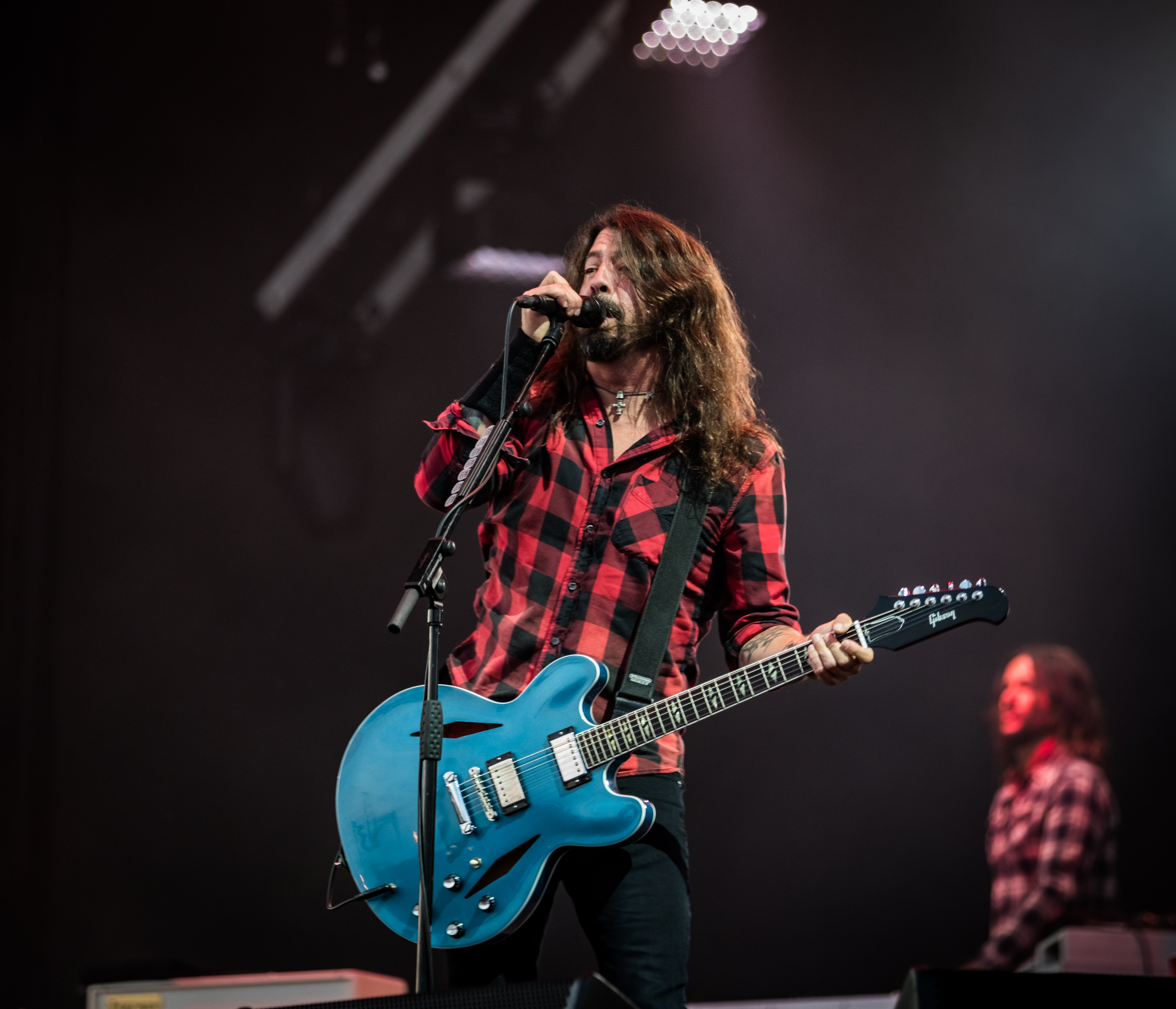
Dave Grohl displaying his signature Gibson DG-335 guitar, a custom model based on the 1964-1971 Gibson Trini Lopez Standard.

Dave Grohl received an early 1960s 335 from Axl Rose as a gift, which was handpicked by Slash. Grohl called it the “nicest I have ever played in my life”. His own version, the DG-335, is based on the Trini Lopez Standard specs. Grohl's version has a different color and with a stop tailpiece instead of the Trini Lopez's trapeze tailpiece.

=== Chris Cornell ES-335 ===
Chris Cornell 335s are based on the Gibson ES-335. The Chris Cornell ES-335 Tribute was designed by Gibson and Chris himself based on the guitars he played in the 1980s and 1990s, mostly Gretsch Jet model, but in Gibson's own 335 style. This guitar uses the same construction of a typical 335 with the three-ply maple top, maple center block, mahogany neck, and rosewood fretboard. However, it uses Lollartron™ pickups in the neck and bridge. These pickups resemble the classic look on the Filter'tron™ pickups, used extensively by Gretsch. They also feature one model (Olive Dab Green) with a Bigsby B7 vibrato tailpiece and another (Satin Ebony) with a Tune O Matic tailpiece.

=== Epiphone ===
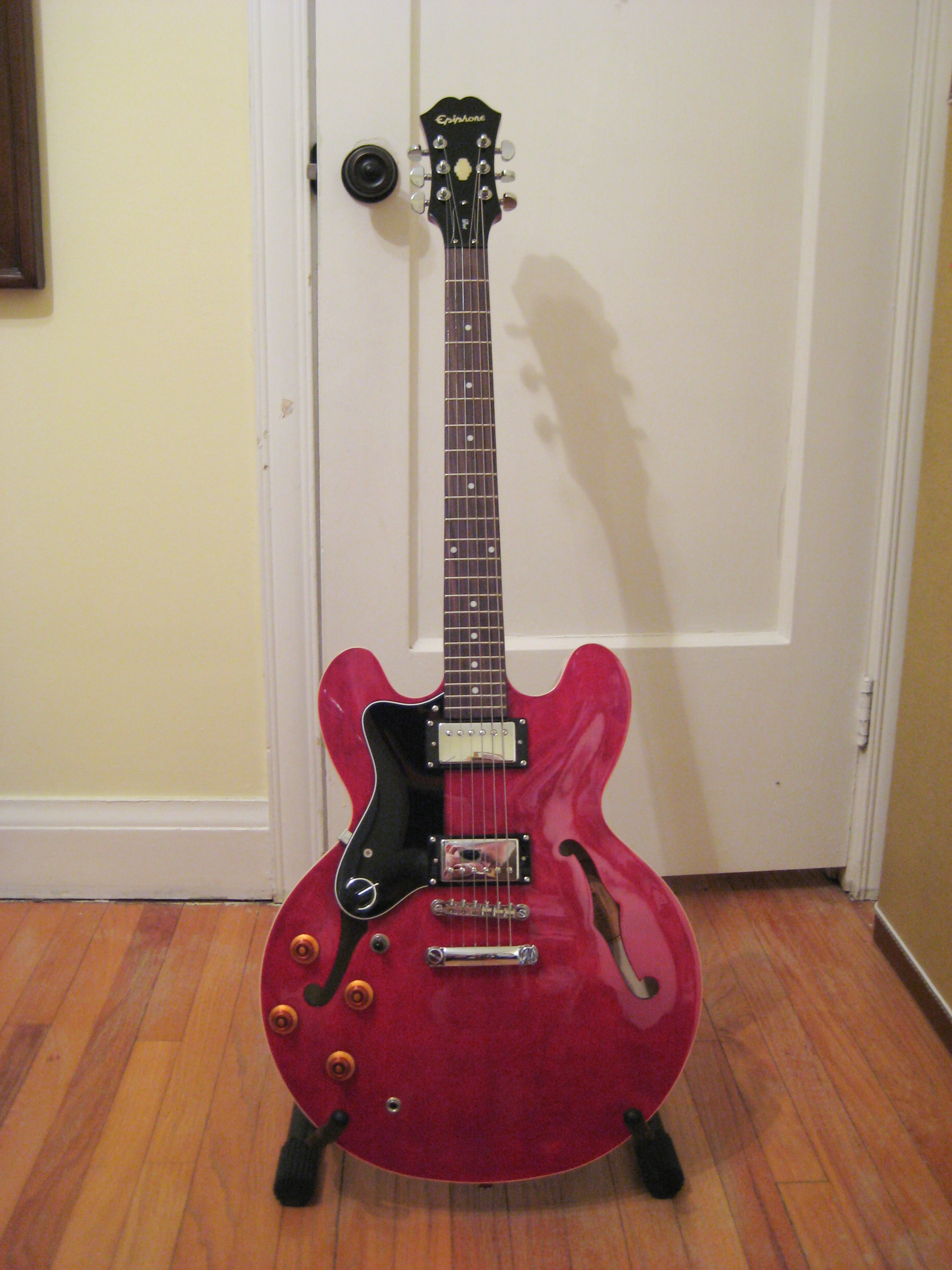
Epiphone Dot (Left-Handed model shown)

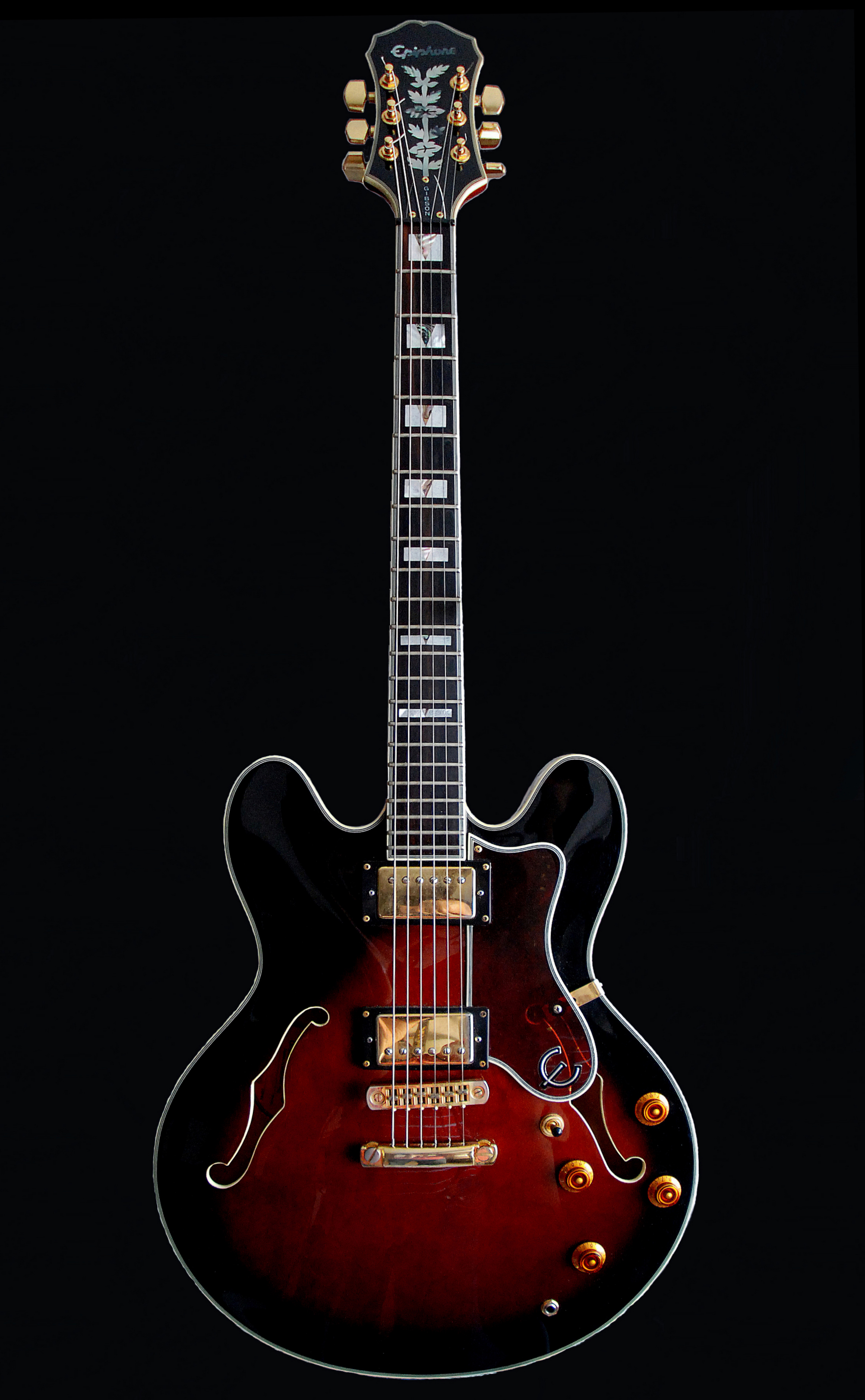
Epiphone Sheraton II

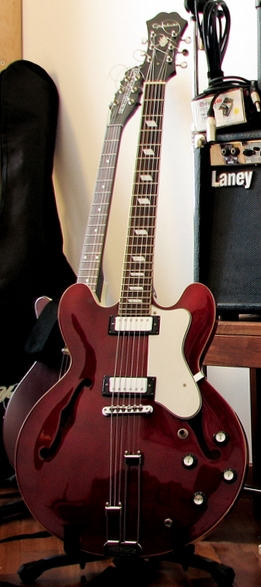
Epiphone Riviera

Gibson also markets a much less expensive version of the ES-335 under its Epiphone brand, called the Dot (referring to its dot-style inlay). Other Epiphone semi-hollowbody style models include the Sheraton (a fancier version of the co-developed ES-335, released the same week, it can make equal claim as the first semi-hollowbody), the Riviera, and the Dot Studio, though some of those are modeled after other guitars in the ES series.

From 1958 to 1970, Epiphone guitars were produced in Gibson's Kalamazoo, MI factory, and shared the similar design, materials and electronics as their Gibson counterparts. The Riviera, Sheraton, Rivoli and Newport models shared similarities with the Gibson ES-335, EB-2 and EB-0 models, respectively. In 1970, Epiphone production ceased in the Kalamazoo plants and Epiphones were made at the Matsumoku factory in Japan. Later Epiphones were constructed under contract with Samick in Korea. Since 2002, almost all Epiphones have been made in the 'Gibson' Qingdao plant in China.

As of 2012, Epiphone also produces the ES-335 PRO, ES-339 PRO, ES-345 Stereo, ES-355, and the Lucille. The ES-335 Pro and ES-339 both feature coil-tapped humbuckers, activated by pull-push volume knobs; the ES-355, gold hardware and a Bigsby tremolo, while the ES-345 Stereo has a Bigsby and VariTone control. The Lucille meanwhile, also features a VariTone control and, in keeping with BB King's Gibson signature model, no f-holes and a fine tuning stop bar tailpiece.

=== Other ===
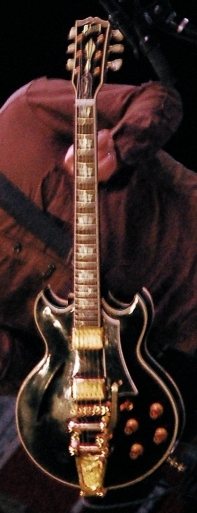
Johnny A model

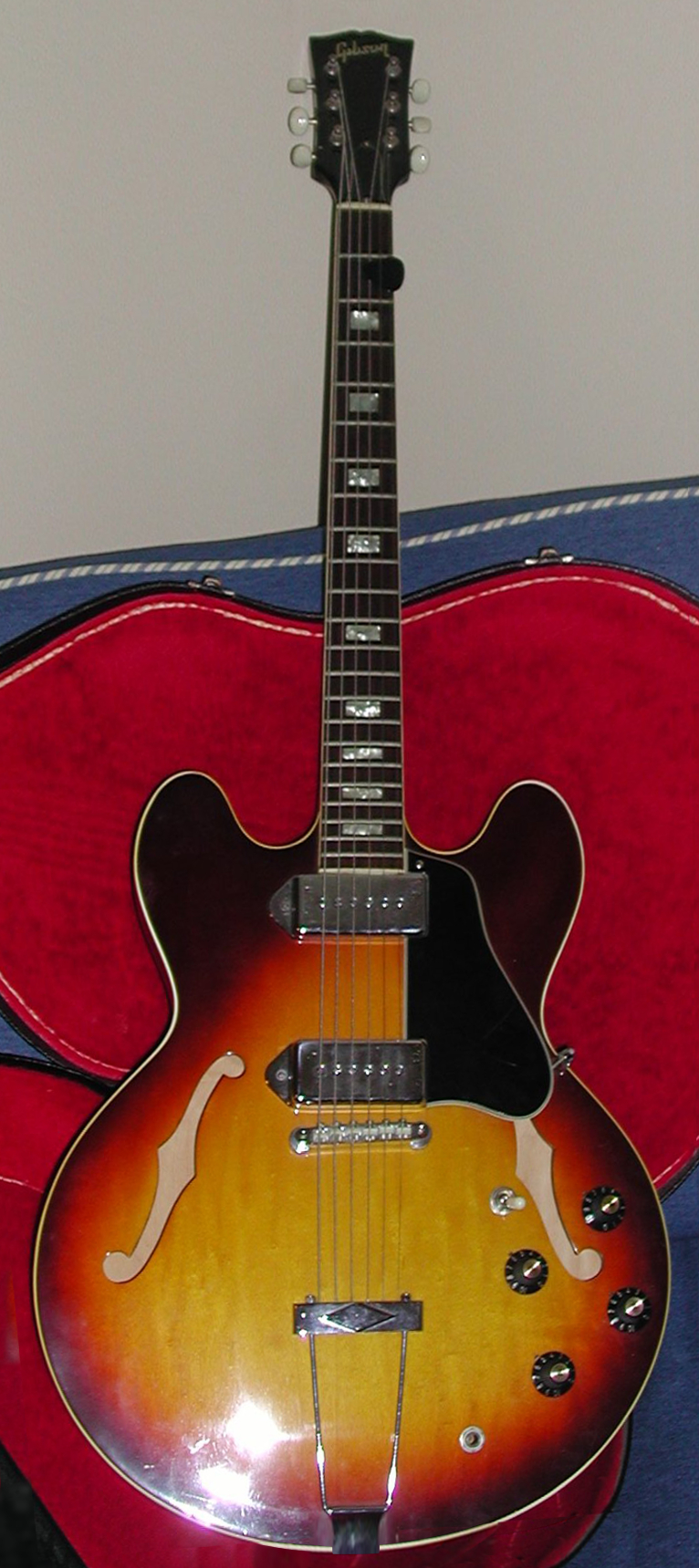
Gibson ES-330TD

Other models based on the 335 include the ES-333, the ES-340 (the toggle switch has settings of the pickups in-phase, pickups out-of-phase and standby), the ES-347 (includes a coil tap, block markers on an ebony fretboard, fine tuning tailpiece and, on earlier models, a brass nut, and a greater sustain block), the ES-339, essentially a 335 with the body reduced to Les Paul size; and the Gibson Les Paul signature bass.

Although the ES-330 resembles the 335, it is actually fully hollow (as opposed to semi-hollow) and features two P-90 pickups (as opposed to two humbucking pickups). The guitar was also designed as the successor to the Gibson ES-225.

== See also ==
- List of Gibson players
- Gibson ES Series
