= Epiphone Dot =

Semi-hollow electric guitar

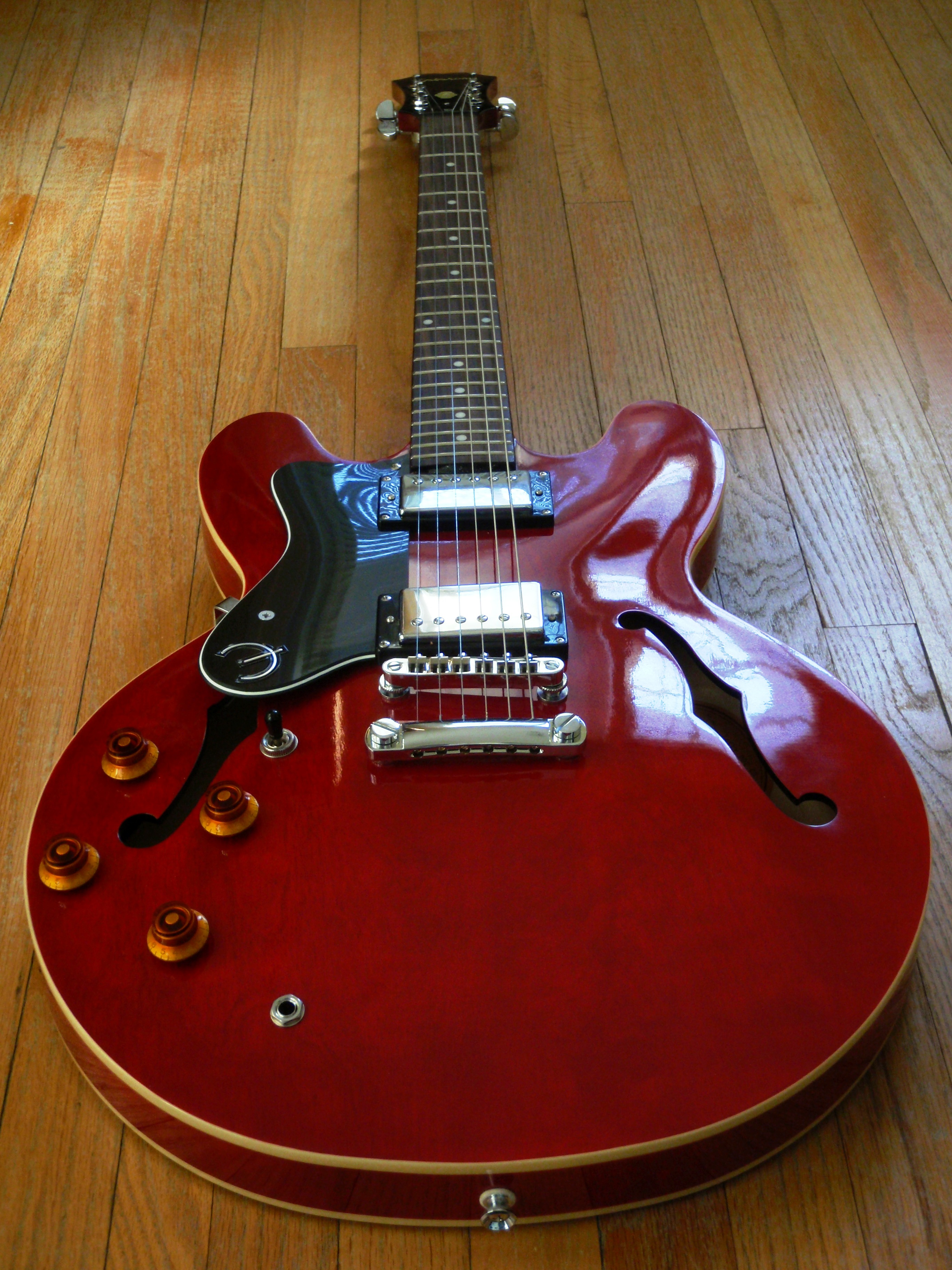
- Left-handed version in Cherry finish
- Manufacturer: Epiphone
- Period: 1997–2019

Construction
- Body type: Semi-hollow
- Neck joint: Set
- Scale: 24.75"

Woods
- Body: Laminated maple top, back and sides, maple or mahogany centre block
- Neck: Maple or mahogany
- Fretboard: Rosewood or Pau Ferro (2019 models only)

Hardware
- Bridge: Fixed
- Pickup: 2 Humbuckers (2 Alnico Classic)

Colors available
- Sunburst, Cherry, Ebony, Natural, (2011: Pelham Blue - Limited Edition. 2019: Aquamarine, Blue Burst - Limited Edition)

The Epiphone Dot is a semi-hollow archtop electric guitar manufactured by Epiphone, a subsidiary of Gibson. It was introduced in 1997 as a more affordable version of the Gibson ES-335, at the high end of entry-level pricing. Reviews describe it as a robustly-constructed, versatile guitar with a smooth, powerful sound, suitable for jazz, blues and some rock styles, but lacking the high output required for heavy metal.

== Construction ==
The Dot has a semi-hollow body made of laminated maple. Two hollow "wings" with f-holes sit on either side of a solid block of mahogany or maple on which the pickups, bridge and tailpiece are mounted, which makes it less prone to feedback than a fully hollow-bodied guitar. It has a glued-in neck of mahogany (before 2008, maple) and a rosewood fingerboard. The name "Dot" is in reference to its fretboard markers, which are simple dots, unlike other Epiphone archtop guitars such as the Casino or the Sheraton, which have more elaborate block inlays. It has two alnico humbucker pickups, each with its own volume and tone control, a three-way selector switch allowing the player to choose one or both pickups, a Tune-o-matic bridge and a stop-bar tailpiece. Formerly made in Korea, since 2002 the Dot has been made in Epiphone's factory in Qingdao, China.

== Variants ==
Also available is the Dot Studio, described as a "stripped down" version of the Dot, with a body made of laminated mahogany, one volume and one tone control, uncovered pickups, no pickguard, and no fretboard markers.

Models formerly available include the Dot Deluxe, with a flame maple laminate top and gold-plated hardware; the Dot Super VS, with a flame maple top and mother of pearl block inlays (2006); and the Dot Royale, with gold-plated hardware and a pearl white finish.

== Notable users ==
- Nathan Amundson (Rivulets)
- David Bazan
- Mary Halvorson
- Josh Homme (Queens of the Stone Age)
- Lee Ranaldo (Sonic Youth)
