= Gibson CS-336 =

Electric guitar model

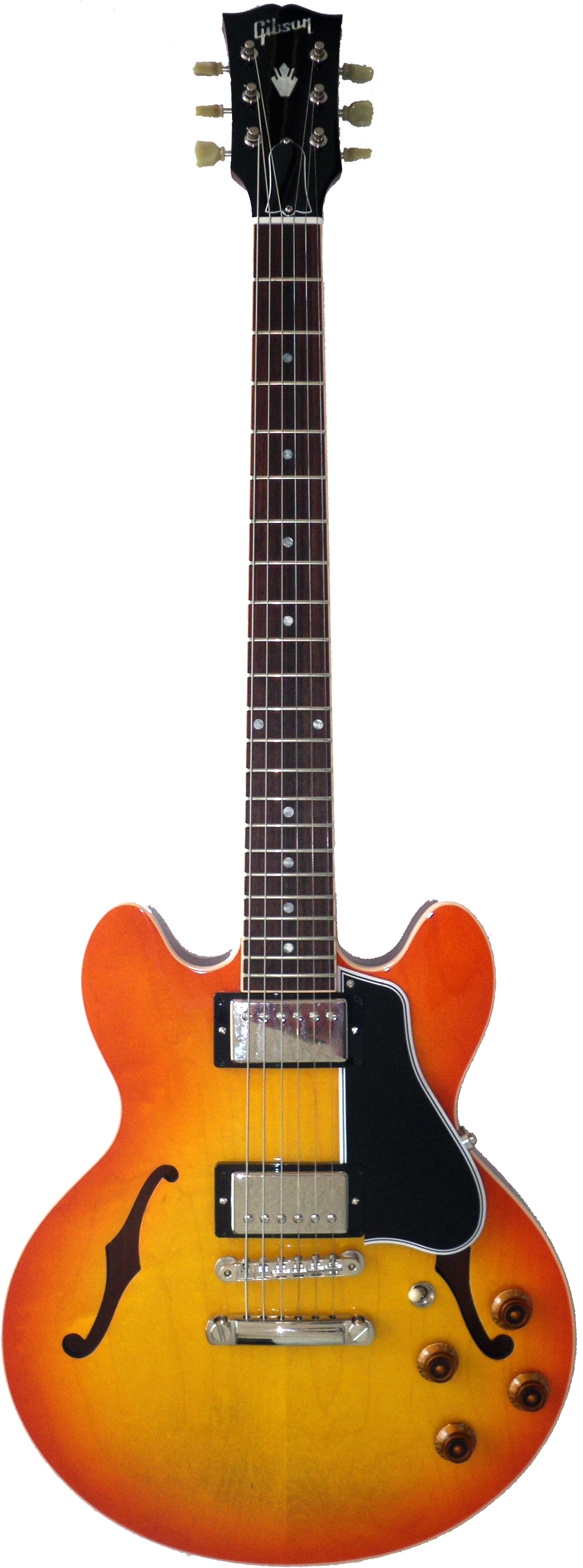
- Manufacturer: Gibson
- Period: 2001 — present

Construction
- Body type: Semi-hollow
- Neck joint: Set
- Scale: 24.75"

Woods
- Body: tonally carved mahogany
- Neck: mahogany

Hardware
- Bridge: Fixed
- Pickup: 2 Humbuckers

Colors available
- Various ("Tangerine Burst" pictured)

The Gibson CS-336 is a semi-hollow electric guitar manufactured by Gibson Guitar Corporation's Custom, Art & Historic Division ("CS" is an abbreviation for "Custom Shop"). Introduced in 2001, the CS-336 was the Custom Shop's first "tonally carved" guitar, meaning that the back, center block, and sides are carved from one single piece of wood (mahogany). This solid block of wood is mated to a carved maple top. After over 100 years, the CS-336 also represented the realization of company founder Orville Gibson's goal to produce an instrument with one-piece back-and-sides construction.

The CS-336 is a scaled-down version of the Gibson ES-335.

== Evolution and related models ==
In 1996, Gibson's Custom Shop introduced the ES-336 ("ES" is an abbreviation for "Electric Spanish"). The ES-336 had a one-piece mahogany back and a contoured maple top. When the CS-336 was introduced five years later, it added the center block and top bracing as an integral part of the back and top pieces (the final step in creating a tonally carved instrument).

ES-335: Introduced in 1958 and the key shape basis for all models listed below.
ES-336: Introduced in 1996, this model was replaced by the CS-336 in 2001.
CS-336: the subject of this article; Gibson's first "tonally carved" guitar.
CS-356: constructed in the same manner as the CS-336, with a range of "upscale" appointments such as gold-finished hardware.
ES-339: same shape as the 336 and 356 models, but not a tonally carved instrument - it has the laminated maple top, maple centerblock, and spruce contour bracing construction of an ES-335. This combination makes the ES-339 a lighter and less expensive guitar than the CS-336. The neck profiles on the CS-336 and ES-339 also differ. The ES-339 offers either a 1959 neck profile (a rounded, chunkier neck) or a slim 30/60 neck.

CS-336 P90: In 2017, Gibson produced 200 CS-336 Mahogany Limited Editions with two Custom P90 pickups specially designed for this model. It also used an aluminum and galvanized wraparound bridge, seen on earlier models of the guitar, with fifty pieces produced for each color, those being Cherry Walnut, TV Black Gold - Mahogany, TV White and TV Yellow. This makes this CS-336 variant a very rare trophy for collectors and guitarists worldwide.

== CS-336 features ==
Each CS-336 is adjusted by one of Gibson’s Plek machines before it leaves the Custom Shop. Key features of the CS-336 include:

- An overall body size that is 13 inches wide, 16 inches long, and 1 11/16th-inches deep.
- Two Gibson ’57 Classic humbucking pickups
- Gibson two-tone pot, two-volume pot, a three-way selector switch control configuration and ABR-1 bridge
- Nickel hardware
- Single-ply binding on body’s top and back
- One-piece mahogany neck with 22-fret rosewood fingerboard
- 24.75" scale length, 1 11/16-inch-wide (43 mm) nut.
