= Gibson EB-2 =

Semi-hollow electric bass

EB-2
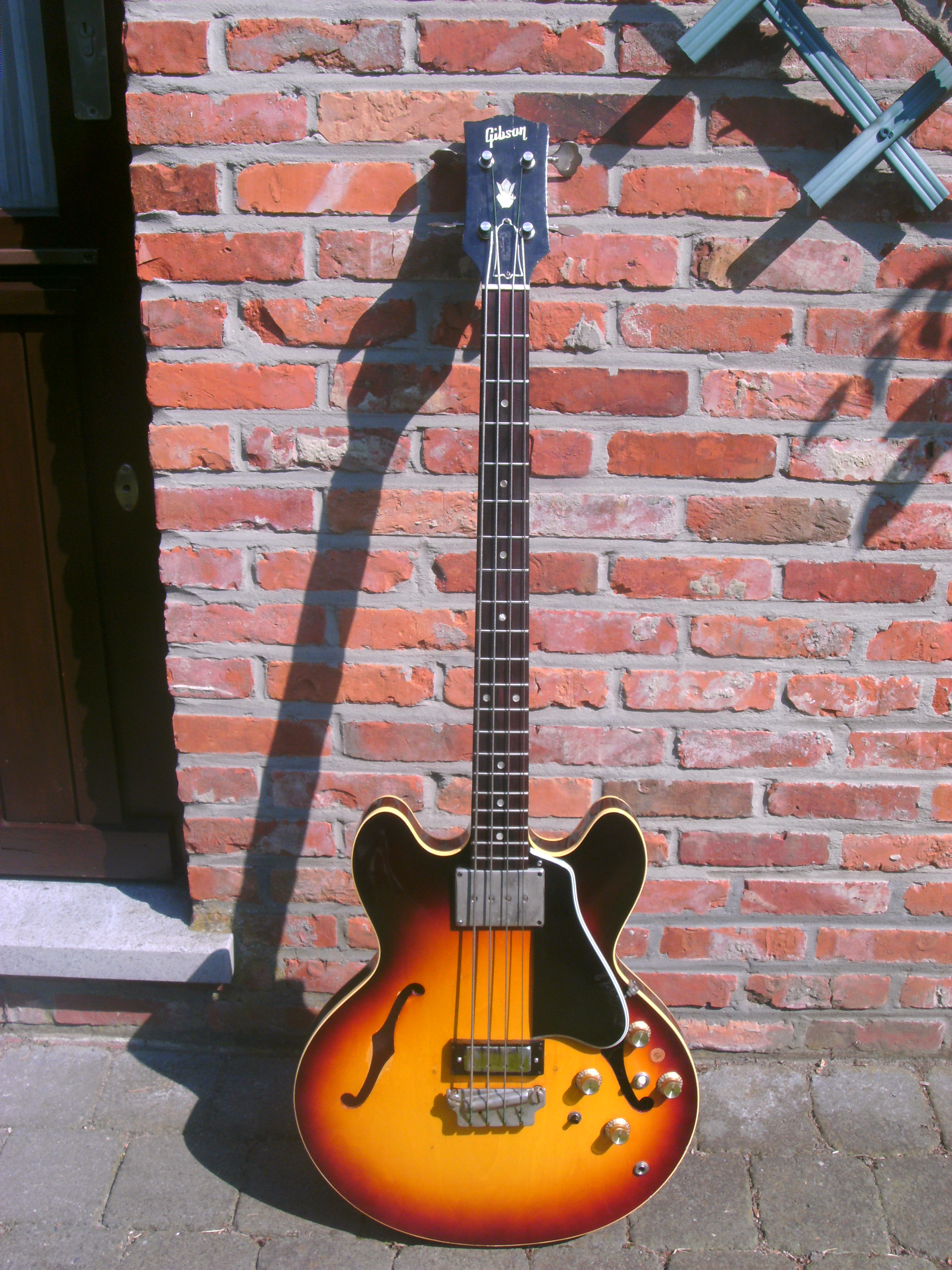
- Manufacturer: Gibson
- Period: 1958–1961, 1964–1972

Construction
- Body type: semi-hollow
- Neck joint: glued-in
- Scale: 30.5"

Woods
- Body: Laminated maple top, back & sides
- Neck: Mahogany
- Fretboard: Brazilian rosewood

Hardware
- Bridge: Fixed
- Pickup(s): One sidewinder (Single Coil in original 1958 model and later, a humbucking pickup), 2 for the EB-2D

Colors available
- Natural, sunburst, and later cherry

The Gibson EB-2 is an electric bass guitar model produced by the Gibson Guitar Corporation from 1958 to 1972, with a hiatus from 1962 to 1963. When production ceased in 1972, a total of 8,017 instruments had been built, with 2,102 of them being EB-2Ds. Willie Moseley, in Vintage Guitar, referred to the bass guitar as possibly "Gibson's biggest bass invention", although it was not a great commercial success, and the Epiphone Rivoli branded version of the model may have sold more copies than the Gibson branded one.

== Description ==
Introduced in 1958, the EB-2 was the bass guitar equivalent of the popular Gibson ES-335. It featured a 335-style semi-hollow body, a short 30.5" scale neck and one large "Sidewinder" humbucking pickup in the neck position. The electronics consisted of a single volume and tone knob. The EB-2N had natural finish, the EB-2 sunburst. The next year a "Baritone switch" was added, which enhanced or cut the bass frequencies, and later a string mute was added to the bridge. By 1961 the original banjo-style tuners (with the pegs pointing backwards) were replaced by larger open gear tuners with the shaft and large flat buttons projecting from the side of the peghead at a 90-degree angle, which required pieces of wood (ears) to be glued to each side to make a wider peghead to accommodate a larger gear footprint.

In 1966, the EB-2D was introduced, which added a mini-humbucker pickup in the bridge position (like the EB-3). Electronics included separate volume and tone controls and a three-way switch to select the pickups, besides the "baritone" switch.

== Variants ==
In 2012, Gibson came out with a "Midtown Standard" bass, a semi-hollow bass loosely based on the EB-2D. Although cosmetically very alike, it supports a long-scale 34" neck, a solid mahogany body with routed tonechambers and a flat maple top, which is considerably smaller than the original 335-shape (somewhere between an ES-335 and a Les Paul shape) and different electronics.
