= Epiphone Rivoli =

Semi hollowbody bass guitar

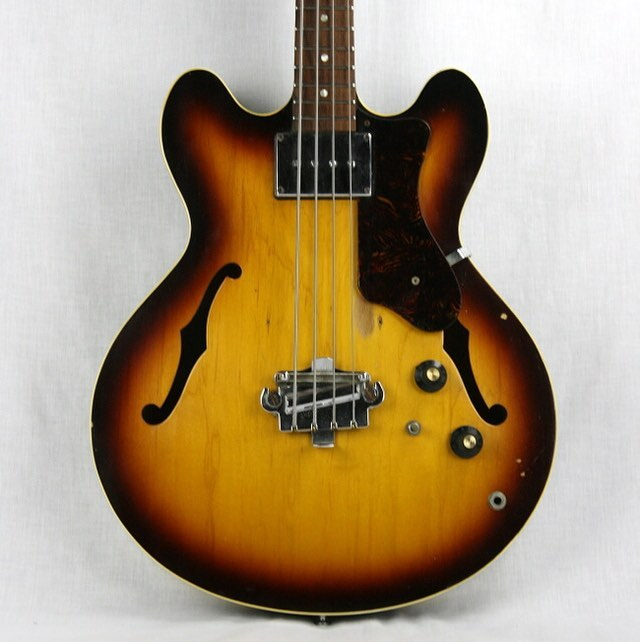
- 1967 Epiphone Rivoli.
- Manufacturer: Epiphone
- Period: 1959–1961, 1964-1970, 1993-1999

Construction
- Body type: semi-hollow
- Neck joint: glued-in
- Scale: 30.5"

Woods
- Body: Laminated maple top, back and sides
- Neck: Mahogany and maple
- Fretboard: Brazilian rosewood through 1970, Indian rosewood for the 1990s reissue

Hardware
- Bridge: Fixed
- Pickup(s): One humbucking pickup, two for the Rivoli II

Colors available
- Sunburst and Cherry. Also available in Pelham Blue, Polaris White, Natural, Burgundy and Ebony

The Epiphone Rivoli was a semi-hollowbody electric bass guitar designed by Gibson and built by Epiphone in Kalamazoo, Michigan from 1959 until 1970. From 1993 until 1999, the model was reissued as a part of the Korean-Japanese Epiphone line.

== Origins ==
After Gibson acquired Epiphone in 1957, Gibson installed an Epiphone production line for archtop instruments in its own factory in Kalamazoo, Michigan, using the stock that Gibson acquired in the takeover, modifying existing Gibson models, designing new Epiphone models, and continuing production of previous Epiphone models. In 1959, the Epiphone Rivoli debuted as a sibling to the then one-year-old Gibson EB-2.

== Design ==
Made on the same production line as the EB-2, the Rivoli closely followed the production of the Gibson model; they shared the same body, neck and hardware. Only certain aesthetic aspects differed, such as the headstock and a tortoise-shell plastic pick guard on some examples instead of the black plastic used on the EB-2.

The Rivoli featured an ES-335-style semi-hollow body, made from laminated maple, a short 30.5-inch scale mahogany neck and one large "Sidewinder" humbucking pickup in the neck position. The electronics consisted of a single volume and tone knob, and a "choke-switch" (from 1959 onwards), which enhanced or cut the bass frequencies. When Gibson decided to move Epiphone production to Japan (Matsumoku) in 1970, production ended for the Rivoli. Its successor, the Epiphone 5120/EA-260, shared very few similarities to the original Rivoli, and had a bolt-on, full-scale maple neck, other hardware and a redesigned body.

== Models and variations ==
The original run from 1959 to 1970, with a hiatus in 1962-63, featured one model, the single-pickup variant, which remained structurally unchanged from start to finish. Only the hardware changed – from a single-coil pickup (in 1959) to a humbucker (1960-70), from banjo tuners to standard Kluson tuners in 1961, and from a bar bridge to a two-point bridge with individual saddles in 1968 (a spring-loaded mute was installed in 1960). Custom finish options different from the stock cherry, sunburst or natural, as well as a second pickup, were available on custom orders.

The Epiphone Rivoli ReIssue guitars, made in Korea and Japan in the 1990s, were only visually identical. The neck was made from maple instead of mahogany, the pickup gave it a different sound, and the two-point bridge was replaced by the three-point bridge used by Gibson from the mid-1970s onward. Black became a factory option for the finish.

The Epiphone Rivoli II was available as well, a Rivoli with two pickups, making it a sibling of the Gibson EB-2D.

== Notable users ==
Many Rivolis ended up in England, where their fat, hefty sound was well suited for Merseybeat and British Invasion bands. Notable Epiphone Rivoli players in the 1960s include Ronnie Lane (The Small Faces), Chip Hawkes (The Tremeloes), Chas Chandler (The Animals), John Entwistle (The Who), Tony Jackson (The Searchers), Karl Green (Herman's Hermits); Paul Samwell-Smith, Chris Dreja, and Jimmy Page of (The Yardbirds); Peter Birrell (Freddie and the Dreamers), Scott Walker (The Walker Brothers), Kevin Ayers (Soft Machine), and Bruce Foxton (The Jam). More recent Rivoli players include Adam Clayton (U2), Nick Bearden (Jamestown Revival) and Robert Levon Been (Black Rebel Motorcycle Club).
