= Gibson ES-333 =

Semi hollow body electric guitar

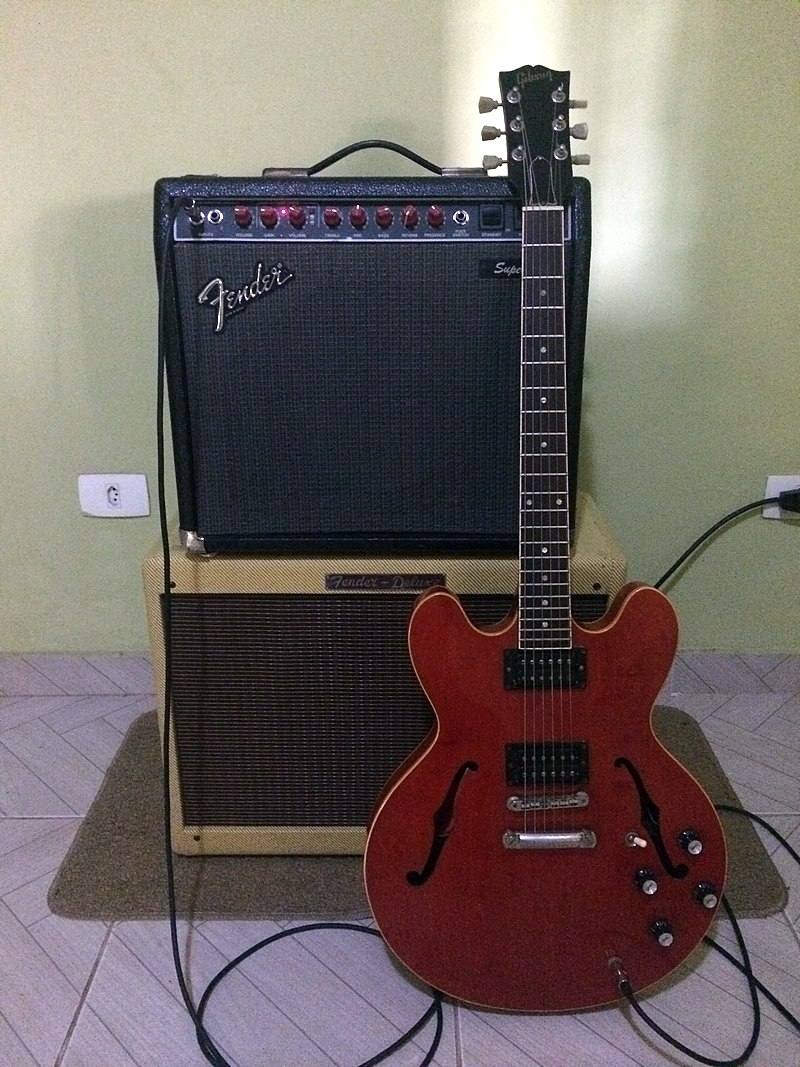
- Manufacturer: Gibson Guitar Corporation
- Period: 2003–2005

Construction
- Body type: Semi-Hollow
- Neck joint: Set

Woods
- Body: Maple / Poplar / Maple laminate
- Neck: Mahogany
- Fretboard: Rosewood

Hardware
- Bridge: Tune-o-matic
- Pickup: 2 humbuckers

The Gibson ES-333 is a semi hollow body electric guitar made by Gibson Guitar Corporation.

The ES-333 is quite similar to the Gibson ES-335, but varies from the ES-335 in the following ways:

- The finish is a thin satin finish, versus the ES-335's thicker full gloss finish.
- The headstock has a silkscreen Gibson logo, versus the ES-335's inlaid pearloid logo.
- The headstock has no further decorative inlay, versus the ES-335's "crown" headstock inlay.
- The pickups are Gibson type 490R and 498T, versus the ES-335's Gibson 57 Classic pickups.
- The back of the body has an access cover for the electronics, versus the solid rear of the ES-335.

The body is made of arched, laminated wood, with the exterior and interior laminations being made of maple. There is a maple central core in the body, to which the top and bottom, and neck are attached. The neck is one piece of mahogany, with a rosewood fingerboard and pearloid dot markers. The hardware is nickel-plated. As delivered by Gibson, the ES-333 had no pickup covers, nor pickguard, and came with black "speed" knobs. Switch tip color was alternately black or creme. The truss rod cover is unadorned, and the headstock overlay is the fibre material used on many contemporary Gibson models.

The ES-333 was available in "faded" brown, cherry red, natural and sunburst finishes, which are thin satin nitrocellulose lacquer. These finishes will take on the appearance of old instruments, after a period of being played, through the action of the players hands rubbing the satin finish to a fairly glossy patina wherever the hands make frequent contact with the instrument. There were also natural (very light amber) and three color sunburst finishes available from some of the larger retailers.

== Tom DeLonge Signature ==
Gibson Tom DeLonge Signature ES-333
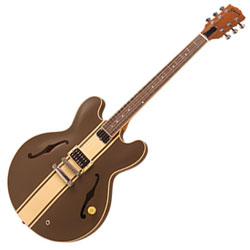
- Manufacturer: Gibson Guitar Corporation, Epiphone, Baratto
- Period: 2003–2012

Construction
- Body type: Semi-Hollow
- Neck joint: Set

Woods
- Body: Maple
- Neck: Mahogany
- Fretboard: Rosewood

Hardware
- Bridge: Nashville TOM bridge, stopbar tailpiece
- Pickup: 1 Gibson Dirty Fingers humbucker

The Gibson Tom DeLonge Signature ES-333 is the signature guitar of Tom DeLonge, the guitarist of popular bands Blink-182, Box Car Racer, and Angels & Airwaves. The guitar features one volume knob and a Gibson Dirty Fingers humbucker in the bridge pickup position.

=== History ===
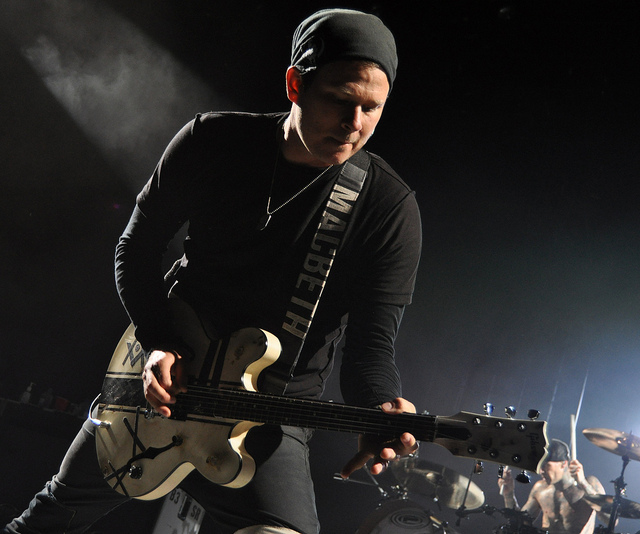
DeLonge plays with an ES-335 style guitar at a Blink-182 tour in 2011

DeLonge was first seen with an ES-335 style guitar while on tour with Box Car Racer in 2002. It was a plain-top Cherry Red Gibson ES-335. Many stickers were put on the guitar and the bridge pickup was replaced with a Seymour Duncan Invader pickup, which DeLonge had previously used in Gibson Les Pauls and Fender Stratocasters, including his signature model of the latter. The neck pickup was most likely kept stock since the cover was never removed. In 2003, Delonge began a signature guitar contract with Gibson. The first prototype guitar featured a satin brown finish (the same as the production version) but had bright orange racing stripes instead of the more commonly seen cream. The intention of the guitar was to be a simple, durable and fashionable modern ES-335 / 333 Gibson. All incarnations of the guitar feature one Gibson Dirty Fingers pickup in the bridge position. It features Gibson's typical Tune-O-Matic bridge plus Stopbar tailpiece layout. The guitar is a through-neck construction with a maple body and mahogany neck with rosewood fretboard. Most variants feature a mahogany veneered headstock (with the exception of a white w/ black stripe model featuring white headstock and a black w/ black stripe featuring a black headstock), and cream binding on the body and fretboard. Gibson released a limited production run of Tom Delonge Signature ES-333s in the mid 2000s. The production version features the standard satin brown with cream stripes, and Sperzel locking tuners. Epiphone currently offers a Chinese-made, lower priced version of the guitar with all the same specs (minus locking tuners). Tom debuted his Gibson signature guitar live on Blink-182's self-titled tour in 2003-2004. Since the formation of Angels And Airwaves, several other custom color combinations have been made for Tom. Since early 2012, Tom has stopped using most striped models (except a white and a brown) on stage and has primarily been using either a solid white or solid black model with no stripes. In later years, the guitars Tom used live had burns, stickers (with either the Blink-182 or Angels & Airwaves logos), tape and other cosmetic alterations. In 2022, DeLonge began using Fender Starcasters upon his second return to Blink-182, effectively retiring his ES-333 guitars.

=== Colors ===
- Brown w/ Orange Stripes (Prototype; Primarily used for recording and rehearsals. Matching orange headstock.)
- Brown w/ Cream Stripes (Most commonly used; Seen with blink-182 or Angels & Airwaves logo's on the body.)
- Black w/ Gloss Black Stripes (There are two of these guitars, one with a matching Black headstock and one with a natural headstock. One is seen with orange paint splatter on the body, and the other now has "AVA" spray painted on the body.)
- Natural w/ Black Stripes (Now has scrapes, burns, stickers, much tape, and with a Freemason logo near the bridge.)
- White w/ Black Stripes (Now has scrapes, burns, and tape on the body. Has AVA printed on the back.)
- Black w/ Cream Stripes (Made by Baratto; Used for low-pitched songs by blink-182.)
- Natural (Made by Baratto; a baritone custom guitar used to play the detuned blink-182 song "Obvious".)
- White (no stripes) (Seen in blink-182's European Tour 2012. Has black paint splatter on body.)
- White (no stripes) (This white guitar has different paint on the body. Seen with Angels & Airwaves.)
- Black (no stripes) (With orange paint. Notably seen with Blink-182 since the 2012 tour.)
- Blue (no stripes) (Originally white. Body has been entirely painted over. Seen only with Angels & Airwaves.)
- Walnut (no stripes)
- White and green separated with yellow stripe with two red stripes with To The Stars.. under the stripes with gold hardware (As seen on Tom's Instagram page)
