= Gibson ES-339 =

Semi-hollowbody guitar manufactured by Gibson

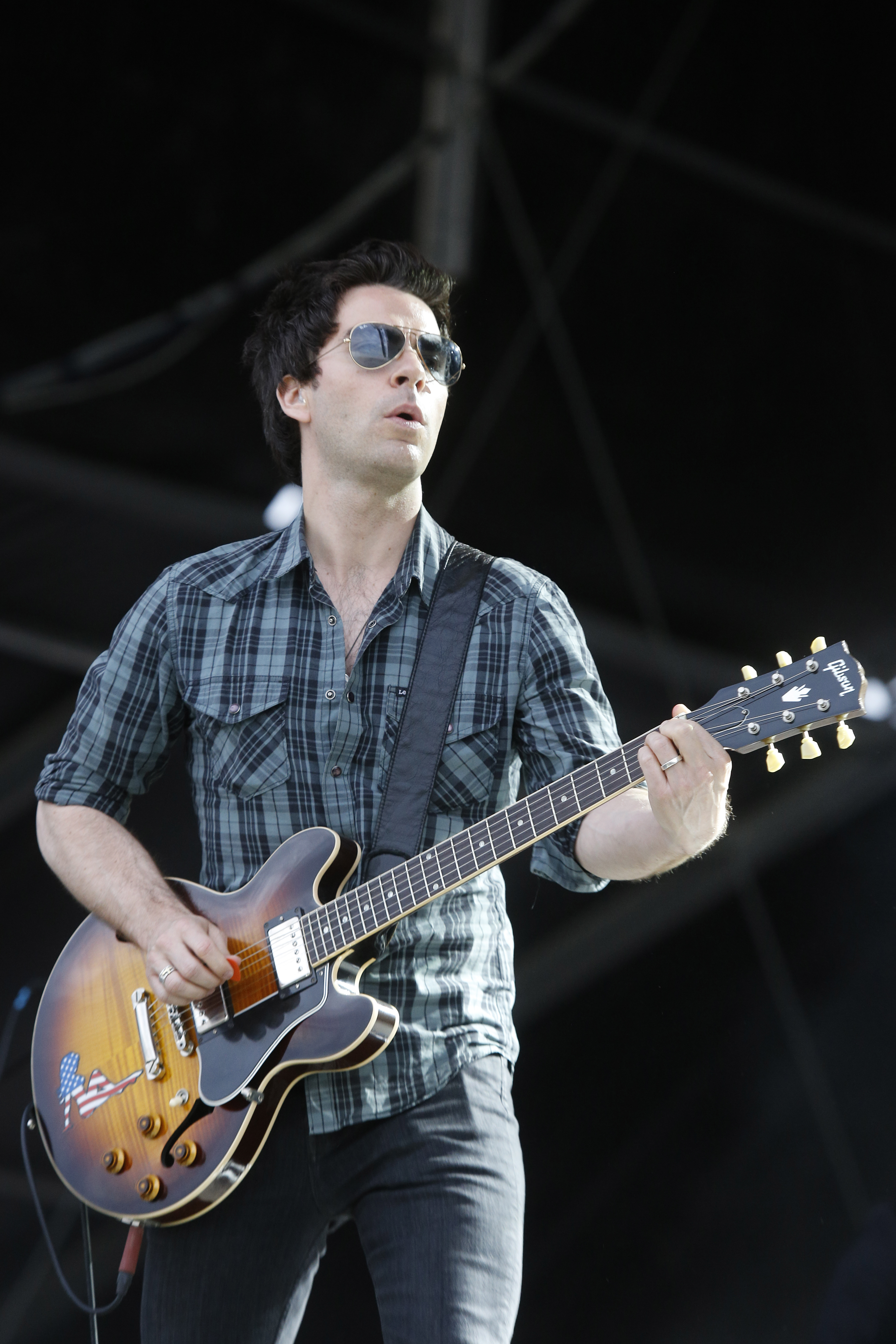
- Kelly Jones of the Stereophonics playing a Gibson cs-336
- Manufacturer: Gibson
- Period: 2007–present

Construction
- Body type: Semi-hollow
- Neck joint: Set

Woods
- Body: Maple, Poplar, Maple (laminated); Maple center block; Spruce contour braces
- Neck: Mahogany
- Fretboard: Rosewood

Hardware
- Bridge: ABR-1
- Pickup(s): 2 '57 Classic, MHS, Burstbucker 1&2 Humbuckers

Colors available
- Light Caramel Burst, Antique Vintage Sunburst, Antique Red, Cherry, Ebony, Pelham Blue, Inverness Green, Antique Blue Burst, Antique Walnut, Olive Drab, Faded Cherry, Sunset Burst, Blueberry Burst

The Gibson ES-339 is a semi-hollowbody guitar which is manufactured by Gibson. The guitar is based on the Gibson ES-335, but has been reduced to the dimensions closer to the Gibson Les Paul.

== History ==
The Gibson ES-339 is the descendant of the ES-335. It is made from a solid maple center block and maple laminate top, back and sides. It is smaller than the ES-335, closer to the size of a Les Paul model.

In terms of electronics, the ES-339 differs from the ES-335 with the use of what Gibson calls the Memphis Tone Circuit.

== Options ==
The standard 339 is available with what is referred to as the "30 over 60" or 30/60 neck and the beefier '59 neck profile. Both necks are made of mahogany. The 30/60 neck is based on the vintage slim neck design seen on most 335 models, with an additional .030 of an inch depth from front to back.

The ES-339 comes with variations of pickups, pair of Gibson 57' classic humbuckers, a model reissue of a PAF pick up with Alnico II magnets or MHS Memphis Historic Spec or Burstbucker 1 & 2.

The ES-339 Figured features all the same design specifications with exception to the wood construction, which is curly maple (also known as flamed maple). This model is even more expensive than the standard ES-339. There is also a ES-339 studio version.

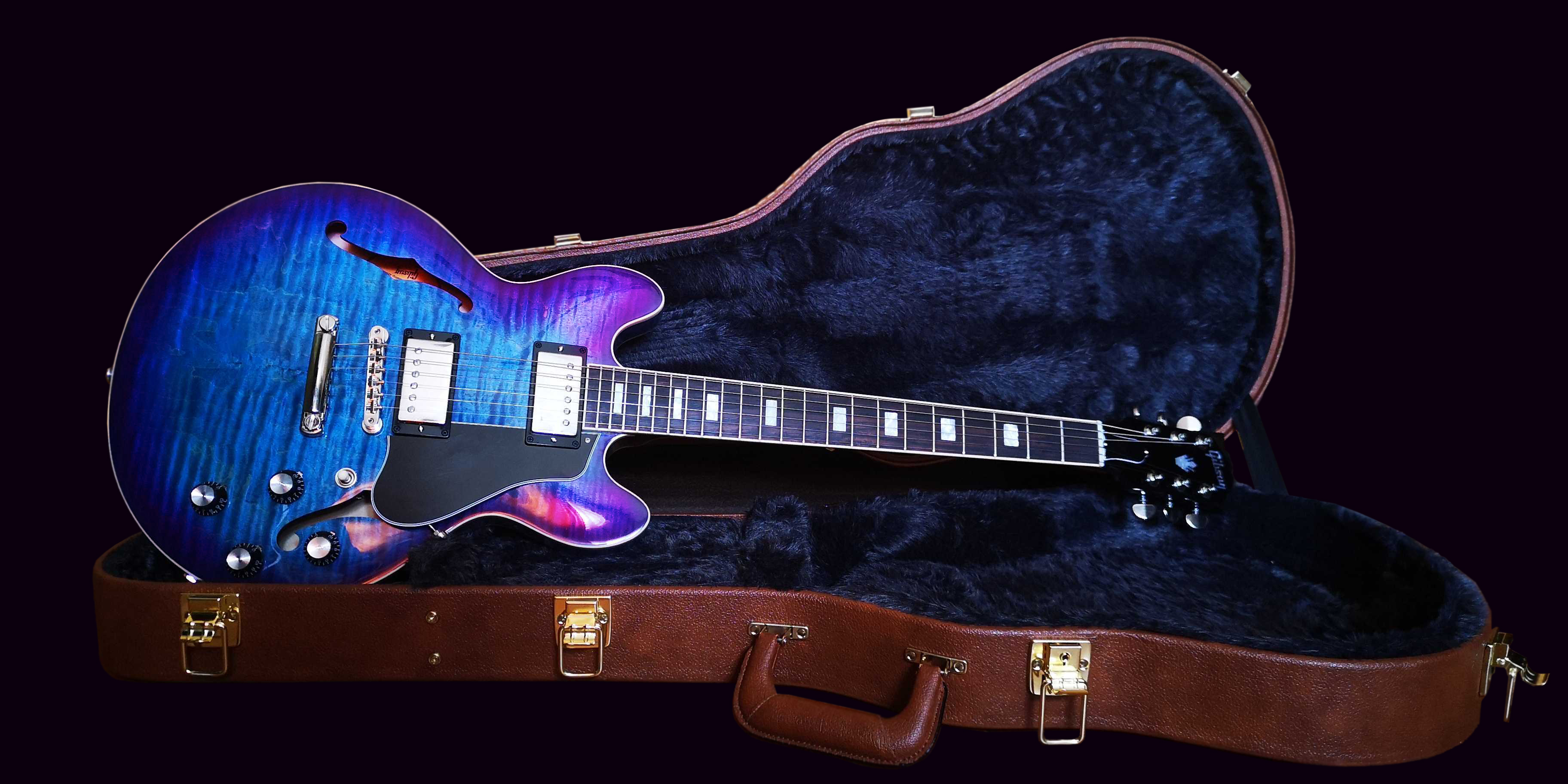
Gibson ES-339 Figured, Blueberry Burst

=== Epiphone ===
Epiphone also made three versions of the ES-339, called the ES-339 Pro, ES-339 P90 Pro and the Ultra-339. They are considerably less expensive than the Gibson version. They currently make one model under the 'Inspired by Gibson' line. This line comes in four colours: Natural, Pelham Blue, Cherry and Vintage Sunburst.
