= Epiphone Sheraton =

Electric guitar

- Manufacturer: Epiphone
- Period: 1958 - 1970

Construction
- Body type: Semi-hollow
- Neck joint: Set
- Scale: 24.75 in (629 mm)

Woods
- Body: Laminated Maple
- Neck: Mahogany
- Fretboard: Rosewood

Hardware
- Bridge: Frequensator, Bigsby, Tremotone
- Pickup(s): 2 Epiphone New York single coil pickups (1958 - 1960); 2 Gibson mini-humbuckers (1961 - 1970); 2 Epiphone ProBucker mini-humbuckers (present); 2 Epiphone New York mini-humbuckers (only in some limited versions)

Colors available
- Natural, Sunburst, Cherry

The Epiphone Sheraton is a thinline semi-hollow body electric guitar. Though the Sheraton and all its variations were introduced under the ownership of the Gibson Guitar Corporation, Epiphone is the exclusive manufacturer.

== History ==
Under the ownership of Epaminondas ("Epi") Stathopoulo, Epiphone was a leading manufacturer of hollow-body and archtop guitars. Epi Stathopoulos died in 1943. Control of the company went to his brothers, Orphie and Frixo. In 1951, a four-month-long strike forced a relocation of Epiphone from New York to Philadelphia. The company was bought out by their main rival, Gibson in 1957. In 1958, Gibson began to expand upon its Epiphone line of semi-hollow guitars. They reworked Epiphone's old Century hollowbody archtop into a thinline hollowbody electric fitted with one "New York" single coil pickup(later replaced by a P-90 pickup, since 1961) in the neck position. This was followed by the introduction of a twin-pickup, double-cut thinline semi-hollowbody, the Sheraton. Epiphone guitars were made by Gibson up until 1970, when production moved to Japan, and major design changes began to occur.

== Design evolution ==
Gibson used the same body for the Sheraton as it was using for its new ES-335, ES-345, and ES-355 models. It featured the same double rounded horns, and had similarly placed electronics. The Sheraton was fitted with a set glued-in neck, in accordance with Gibson's standard practice. Distinguishing characteristics of the Sheraton included its multiple body binding (like that of its top of the line Gibson cousin, the ES-355); its Frequensator tail piece; and its headstock and fretboard inlays. Unlike any of the semi-hollowbodies in the Gibson line, the Sheraton's headstock featured Epiphone's traditional fancy vine (or "tree of life") inlay on its headstock, while its fretboard featured a block and triangle (or "V") inlay of mother-of-pearl and abalone, as well as binding on the fretboard's surface, inset slightly from the outer edges.

1958 Epiphone Sheraton introduction specs: Thin body, double cutaway, semi-hollow with solid maple block down center; two Epiphone "New York" single coil pickups; two volume and two tone controls with white 'carousel' knobs, and a pickup selector switch; tune-o-matic bridge with no retainer wire; gold plated metal parts; Frequensator tailpiece or Bigsby vibrato; bound tortoise-shell pickguard; Epiphone 'E' tuners; multiple bound top and back; single bound rosewood fingerboard; abalone/pearl block "V" fingerboard inlays, neck joins body at 19th fret, 5-piece neck (from remaining Epiphone-built inventory) has a "V" chunky back shape; tree of life pearl peghead design; sunburst or natural finish.

1961 Sheraton specs: Parts begin to change to Gibson-made parts. The pickups are changed from the New York single coils to mini-humbuckers, knobs become gold gibson bonnet knobs, tuners become Grovers. Serial number now pressed into the back of the peghead between the D and G tuners, in addition to being on the blue Epiphone label in the bass "f" hole. The new Epiphone "Trem-o-tone" adjustable vibrato tailpiece is introduced.

1962 Sheraton specs: Production changes from NY-made Epiphone necks to Gibson-made mahogany necks. Cherry red finish introduced (this will remain the rarest Sheraton finish throughout Gibson's production period of the 1960s). "Epiphone" script inlay on headstock becomes more streamlined in appearance.

1963 Sheraton specs: Peghead shape becomes more elongated. Binding on fretboard moves to outer edges (no longer inset).

1965 Sheraton specs: Sunburst finish becomes more two-tone (tobacco to amber).

Late 1960s to 1970: Neck width narrows to 1 9/16", as on many Gibson-made guitars of the era.

Sheraton production totals (data from 1961 to 1970 only):

- Cherry: 53
- Cherry with vibrato: 20
- Natural: 59
- Natural with vibrato: 49
- Sunburst: 243
- Sunburst with vibrato: 197

In 1970, production ceased in the U.S., and began in Japan. Mini-humbucking pickups were discontinued on the Sheraton, changing to standard full-sized humbuckers; serial numbering system changes. Body and headstock shapes began to evolve, as they will continue to do throughout the 1980s and into the 2000s, as production also shifted from Japan to Korea. Korean build manufactured up until at least 2012; however, serial numbers changed to an all-number type after 2008. To tell if it is Korean built, it will have the following prefix: I=Saein, S=Samick, U=Unsung, and R or P=Peerless, and if an all-number type, the serial number will be identified (Unsung for example) as '21' as the fifth and sixth numbers.

Foreign manufacturers:

- Matsumoku, Japan: 1979–1986.
- The Elite/Elitist Sheraton, Terada Japan: 2002–2008.
- The standard Korean Sheraton, made in Korea: 1997–2006
- The standard Chinese Sheraton, made in China: 2008–present

== Sheraton II ==
Epiphone Sheraton II
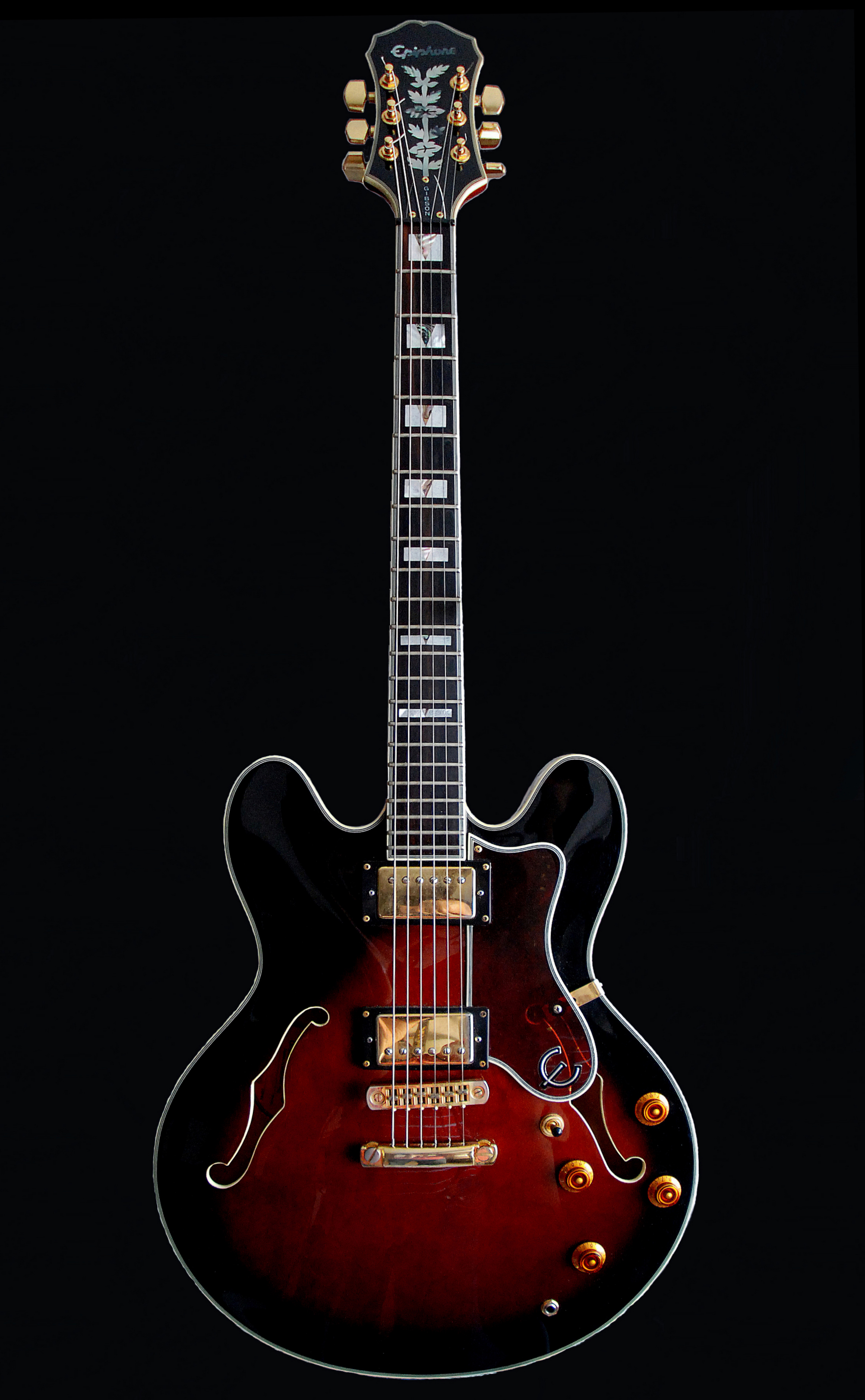
- Manufacturer: Epiphone
- Period: 1986-2014

Construction
- Body type: Semi-hollow
- Neck joint: Set
- Scale: 24.75"

Woods
- Body: Laminated Maple
- Neck: three piece maple
- Fretboard: Rosewood

Hardware
- Bridge: Fixed
- Pickup: 2 Humbuckers

Colors available
- Ebony, Natural, Vintage Sunburst

The Epiphone Sheraton II was introduced in 1986, and featured only one major difference – the 'Frequensator' tail piece (which was only available on only certain models) was now replaced by a fixed stop bar. The 'First Release' (original) Sheraton II "re-issue" became much more popular than the original Epiphone's high-end guitars, the elitist line, includes a Sheraton, although the machine heads (tuners) were less than desirable. Unlike the 'original' line of Sheraton guitars, which used the New Yorker-style humbucker pickups, the Sheraton II used the Gibson U.S.A. full-sized gold-plated style of humbuckers. During some years, approximately between 2008 and 2012, Sheraton IIs were built with three-piece necks as opposed to the more common five-piece neck. Currently original Sheratons are rare, but when Sheraton IIs were in production, the specifications changed immensely, including the change to Grover machine heads.

The most recently manufactured Sheratons were John Lee Hooker signature models. Recently the vintage sunburst finish that many Sheratons are made in has changed colour from a black on deep red colour (shown right) to a black on orange-yellow colour.

== Sheraton II Pro ==
Epiphone Sheraton II PRO
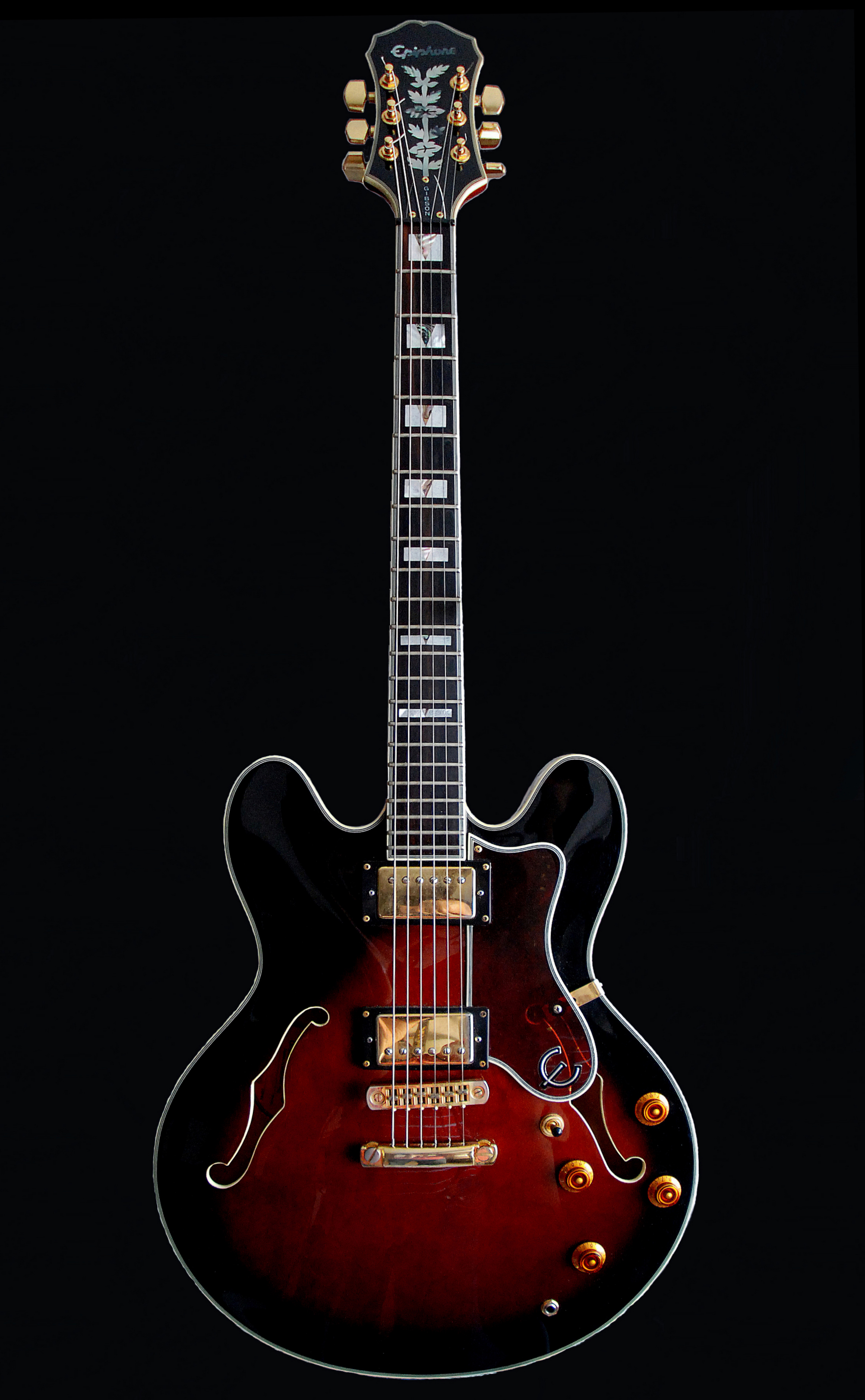
- Manufacturer: Epiphone
- Period: 2014-present

Construction
- Body type: Semi-hollow
- Neck joint: Set
- Scale: 24.75"

Woods
- Body: Laminated Maple
- Neck: five piece maple and walnut
- Fretboard: Pau Ferro

Hardware
- Bridge: Fixed
- Pickup: 2 ProBucker Humbuckers

Colors available
- Ebony, Natural, Vintage Sunburst

In 2014, the Epiphone Sheraton II was replaced by the Sheraton II Pro, with the Alnico classic pickups in the Sheraton II being replaced by the new ProBucker pickups with coil-splitting. The volume pots were also given a push-pull function, allowing the humbuckers to be split for single-coil pickup sounds, the rosewood fretboard was replaced with pau ferro and the nut was changed to a Graph Tech NuBone XL nut, which dampens string vibration less than the previous plastic version.

== Endorsement ==
Oasis guitarist Noel Gallagher has owned several Sheratons, including an early model featuring mini humbuckers and a frequensator with a customized Union Jack paint work. Following this, Epiphone produced the Noel Gallagher Supernova (which was actually a variant of the similar Epiphone Riviera, rather than the Sheraton) and was made available to the public with a Union Jack, Manchester City blue, Cherry Red or Black Ebony finish. In 2014, Epiphone produced a Union Jack Ltd Edition Sheraton (limited to 1000). Though this is not an official signature guitar, it is much closer to Gallagher's Union Jack Sheraton, although with two noticeable differences. The blue of the Union Jack is darker than on Gallagher's guitar, and only features the Union Jack paintwork on the front, opposed to the whole of the body. Brian Aubert, frontman for the Silversun Pickups, has a modified Sheraton with silver hardware. Furthermore, the Epiphone Sheraton II has been used by Kings of Leon lead guitarist Matthew Followill. Ezra Koenig of Vampire Weekend plays a Sheraton II almost exclusively. Also, Ted Leo of Ted Leo & The Pharmacists used one for many years. Most notably, the Sheraton and Sheraton II were the main guitars used by blues legend John Lee Hooker. Epiphone introduced a signature John Lee Hooker Sheraton and Sheraton II in 2000, the year before his death.

== Notable Sheraton players ==
- Emily Wolfe not only plays an Epiphone Sheraton, but she has her own signature models, the Emily Wolfe Sheraton Stealth and the White Wolfe.
- Carl Wilson of The Beach Boys used a sunburst Sheraton on tour occasionally in 1972–73, and these performances featured on the band's 1973 live album The Beach Boys in Concert. In later years, a custom made natural 12 string Sheraton with a double pickguard was made especially for him and is the only model ever made.
- Matthew Followill of Kings of Leon has multiple sheratons in different finishes.
- John Lee Hooker mainly used a Sheraton.
- David Howell Evans, better known as The Edge of U2 has played a natural Sheraton II.
- Drake Levin of Paul Revere and The Raiders used a cherry red Sheraton.
- Ted Leo used a Sheraton for many years.
- Ezra Koenig plays a natural Epiphone Sheraton (no pickguard).
- Jeffrey Foskett a touring and studio musician for Brian Wilson and The Beach Boys used multiple Sheratons on tour including the natural 6 string and 12 string models, as well as the one of a kind custom made 12 string Sheraton originally made for Carl Wilson.
- Dax Riggs of Acid Bath, Agents of Oblivion, Deadboy and the Elephantmen and currently his solo project under the name Dax Riggs. He plays a white Sheraton II with gold trim.
- Noel Gallagher played a Sunburst Sheraton at Knebworth park during the historic two night concert. As well as a Union Jack painted Sheraton at Maine Road, both in 1996. Epiphone released two "Supernova" guitars based on Noel's preference for the Sheraton body.
- Paul Arthurs has owned several Sheraton's in the past but is more often seen using the similar Epiphone Riviera.
- Brian Aubert plays a modified Sheraton.
- Tom Delonge plays an ebony Sheraton II in the "I Miss You" music video by Blink 182.
- Aaron Dessner of the National plays a Sheraton.
- Randy Randall of No Age plays a Sheraton.
- Ben Nichols of Lucero has played a natural Sheraton II for many years.
- Gem Archer of Oasis plays a cherry Sheraton.
- Paul Doucette of Matchbox Twenty plays a Natural finish Sheraton with Mini Humbuckers, and an Elitist Series Cherry finish Sheraton with Mini Humbuckers with Vibrato.
- Jens Lekman plays a sunburst Sheraton II.
- Scott Thurston of Tom Petty and the Heartbreakers
- Shimon Moore (ex-frontman) of Sick Puppies plays an ebony Epiphone Sheraton II.
- Shane Theriot uses Sheraton II, current Hall and Oates guitarist.
- Heath Fogg of Alabama Shakes plays a Sheraton II.
- John Primer uses a Sheraton II.
- Mike Graff of Course of Empire played a black Sheraton II with gold hardware and bigsby before it was stolen in 2000.
- Leon Rhodes of Ernest Tubb's Texas Troubadours used a Sheraton while in the band from 1960 to 1966.
- Andy Huxley of The Eighties Matchbox B-Line Disaster can be seen playing an ebony Epiphone Sheraton II in the Edgar Wright directed music video for "Psychosis Safari"
