= Inlay (guitar) =

Decorative material set into the wooden surface

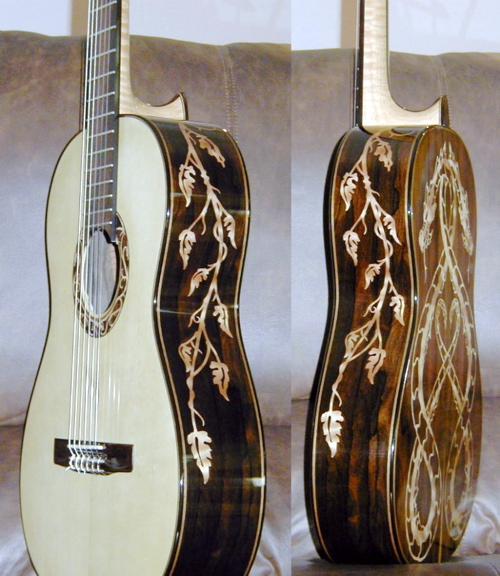
Body and sound hole inlays

Inlay on guitars or similar fretted instruments are decorative materials set into the wooden surface of the instrument using standard inlay techniques. Although inlay can be done on any part of a guitar, it is most commonly found on the fretboard and neck, headstock—typically the manufacturer's logo, and the rosette around the sound hole of acoustic guitars. Commonly used materials include nacre ("mother of pearl"), clay, shells, plastic, and wood.

Some very limited edition high-end or custom-made guitars have artistic inlay designs that span the entire front (or even the back) of the guitar. These designs use a variety of different materials and are created using techniques borrowed from furniture making. While these designs are often just very elaborate decorations, they are sometimes works of art that even depict a particular theme or a scene. Although these guitars are often constructed from the most exclusive materials, they are generally considered to be collector's items and not intended to be played. Large guitar manufacturers often issue these guitars to celebrate a significant historical milestone.

== Fretboard ==
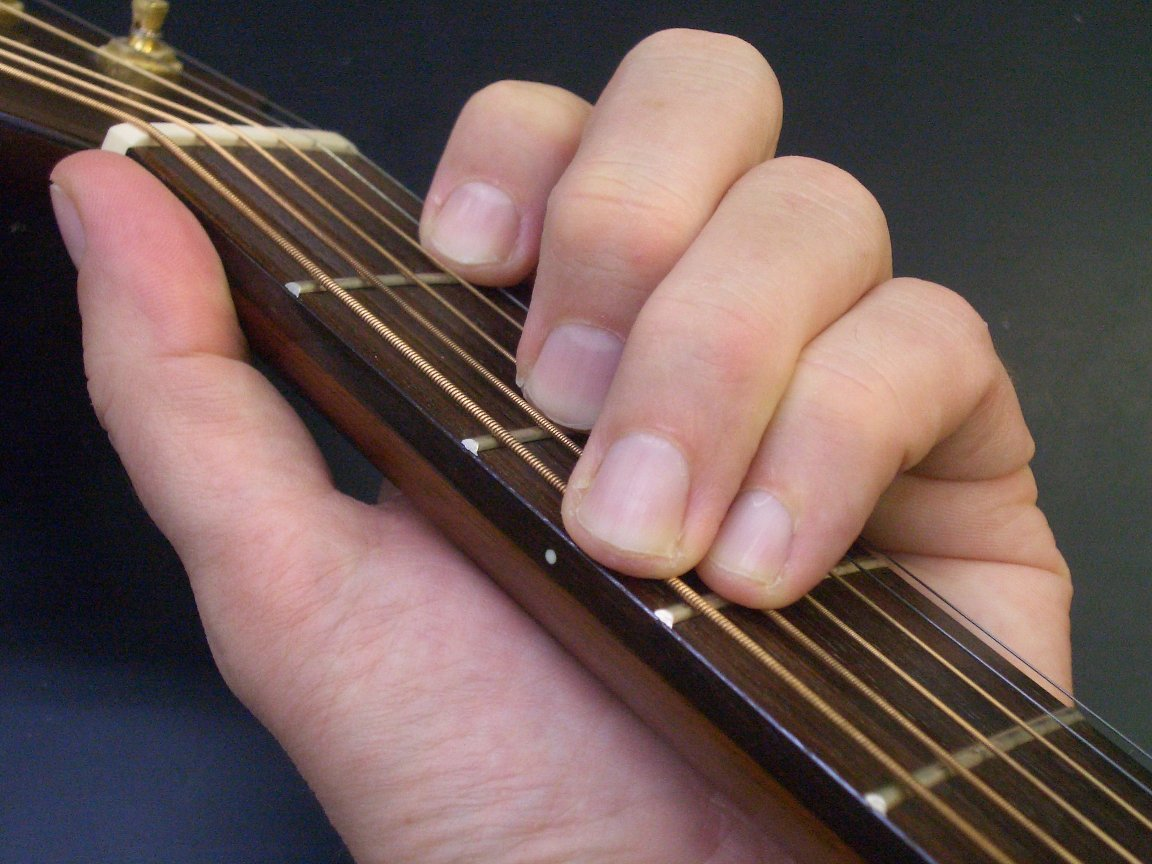
Side of the fretboard inlays, with a small dot that marks 3rd fret

Some popular fretboard inlays include rhombuses, parallelograms, isosceles trapezoids, shark fins and rectangles. Circular (dot) markers are the easiest and least expensive to produce, because drilling circular indentations and cutting circular inlays (from sheets or rods) require the least time and resources. They are typically of a color contrasting with the color of the fretboard: For example, whereas a luthier might use black for a light-colored fretboard such as maple, that same luthier would likely use white, silver, or mother-of-pearl for a fretboard made of a darker wood such as rosewood or ebony.

Many manufacturers use a distinct shape for their fret markers to create a brand identity to set themselves apart from competitors. Gibson uses isosceles trapezoids while Fender uses dots; PRS famously uses simplified silhouettes of various bird species as fret markers for most of their guitar models. Others include lightning bolts, letters and numbers.

Smaller dots are also usually inlaid into the upper edge of the fretboard or the neck to be more visible to the player who views the instrument from the side.

LEDs or optical fiber can be employed to illuminate the markers. This is mostly employed by players who perform in front of live audiences where the lighting is either insufficient or constantly changing.

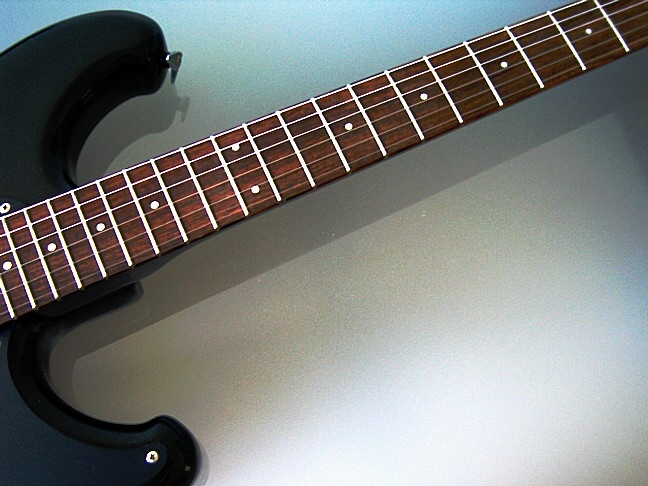
Dots (used by Fender, Gibson and on most guitars)

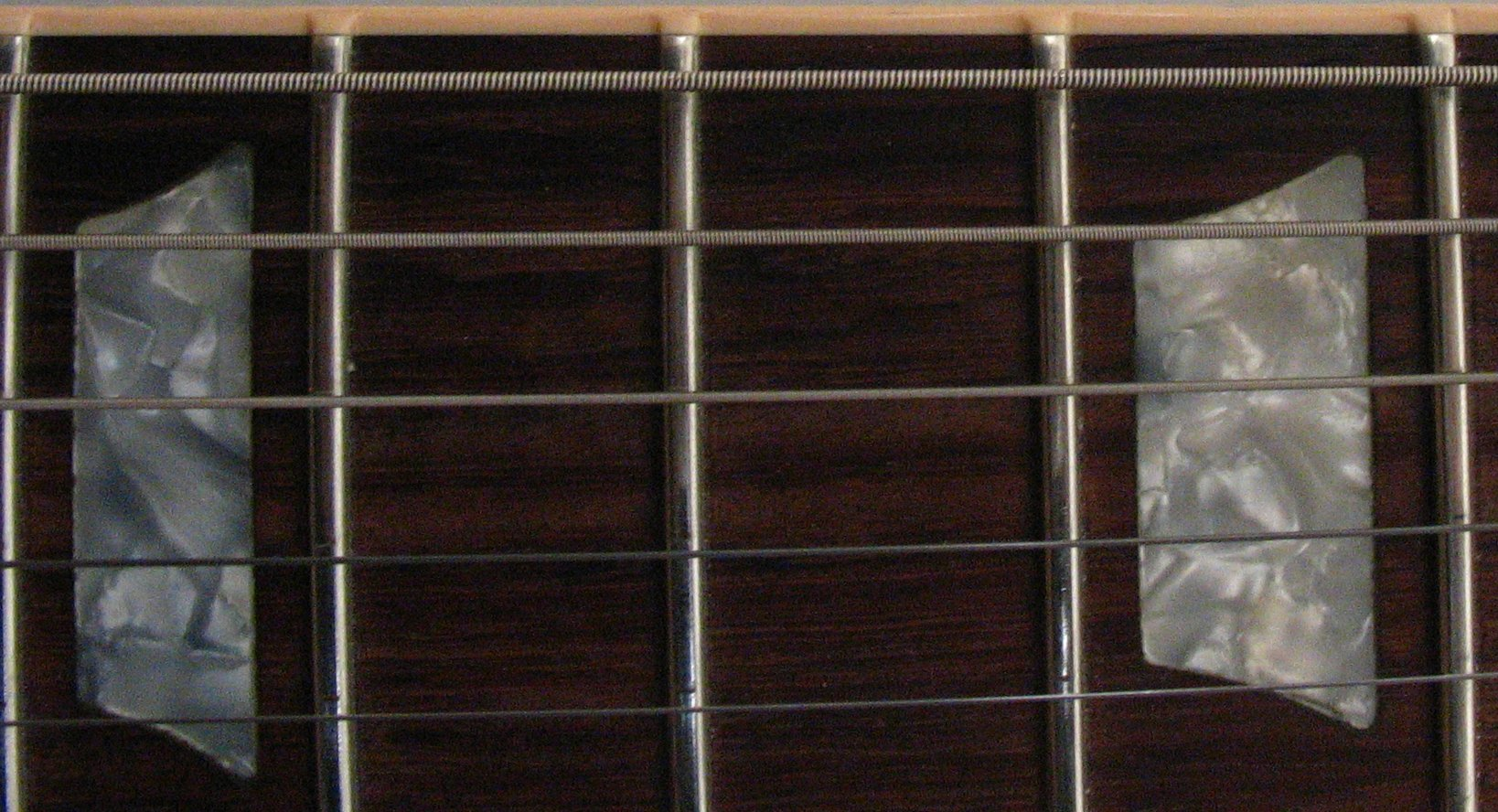
Isosceles trapezoids (Gibson-style)

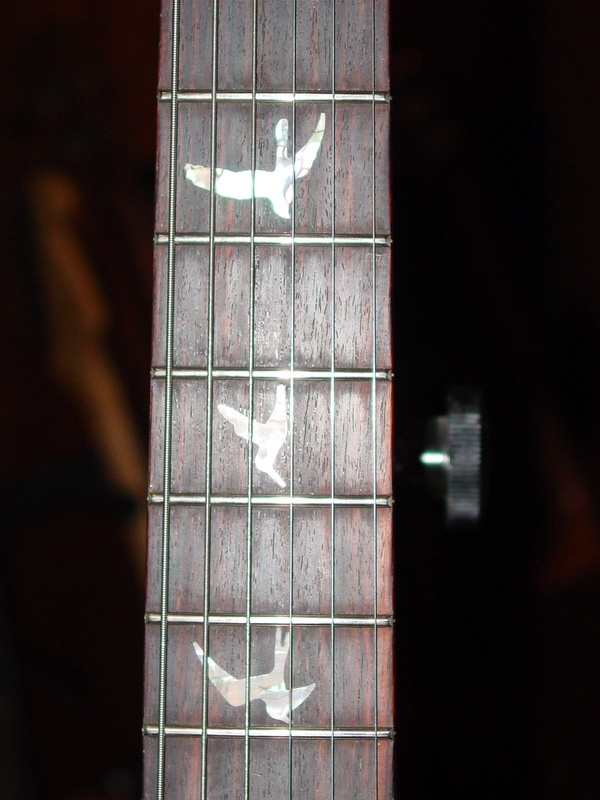
Birds (PRS)

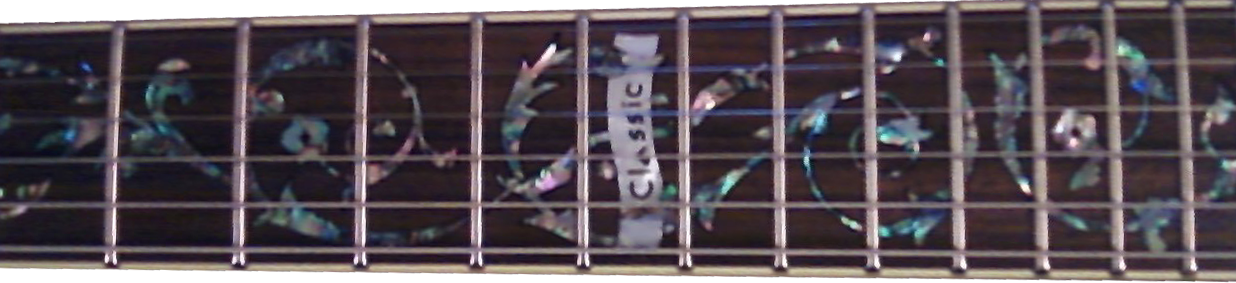
Intricate vine

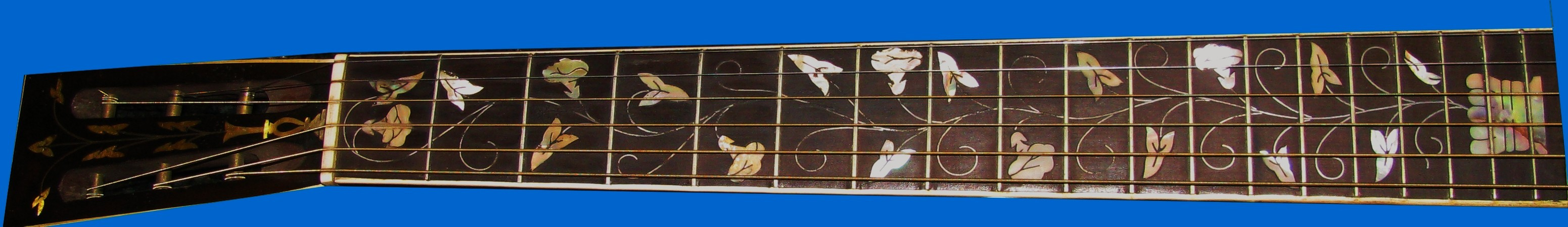
Morning Glory Flower pot

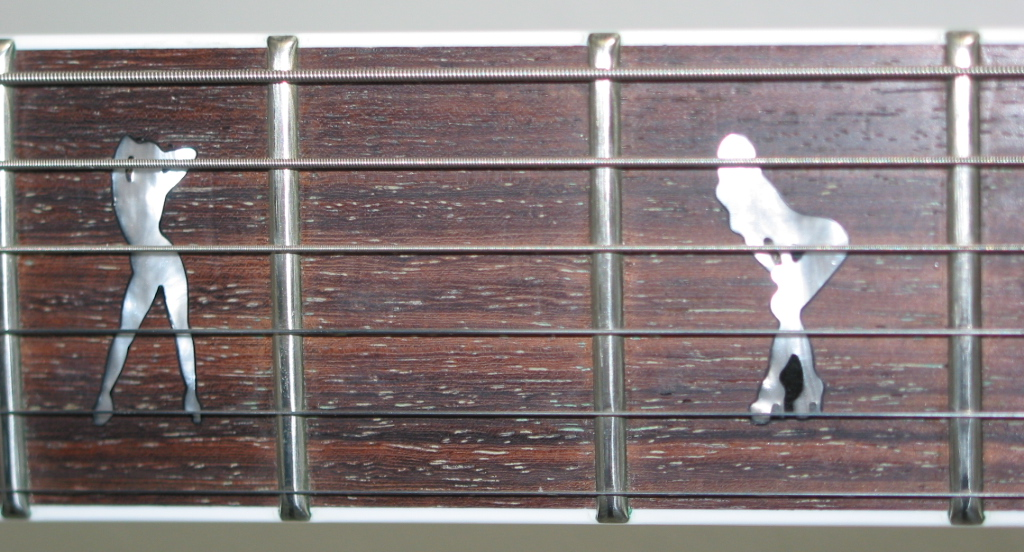
Women in sexually suggestive poses

=== Schemes ===

There are two popular fretboard inlay schemes:

The most common scheme has single inlays on the 3rd, 5th, 7th, 9th, 15th, 17th, 19th, and 21st frets, with double inlays on the 12th and 24th frets to signal octave changes. A secondary scheme has the single inlays on the 9th and 21st frets moved to the 10th and 22nd frets.

Resonator guitars usually have inlays like the first scheme shown above but with a single inlay on the 12th, and double inlays on the 15th.

Playing these frets on the E string yields the notes E, G, A, B, D that fit perfectly into the E minor pentatonic scale. Such a scheme is very close to the coloring of a piano's keys and is in use on a few models of classical guitars, which often have fewer or no position markers.

Some guitars like the Gibson Les Paul Custom follow one of the two schemes, with an added inlay on the 1st fret.

== Headstock, neck and pickguard ==
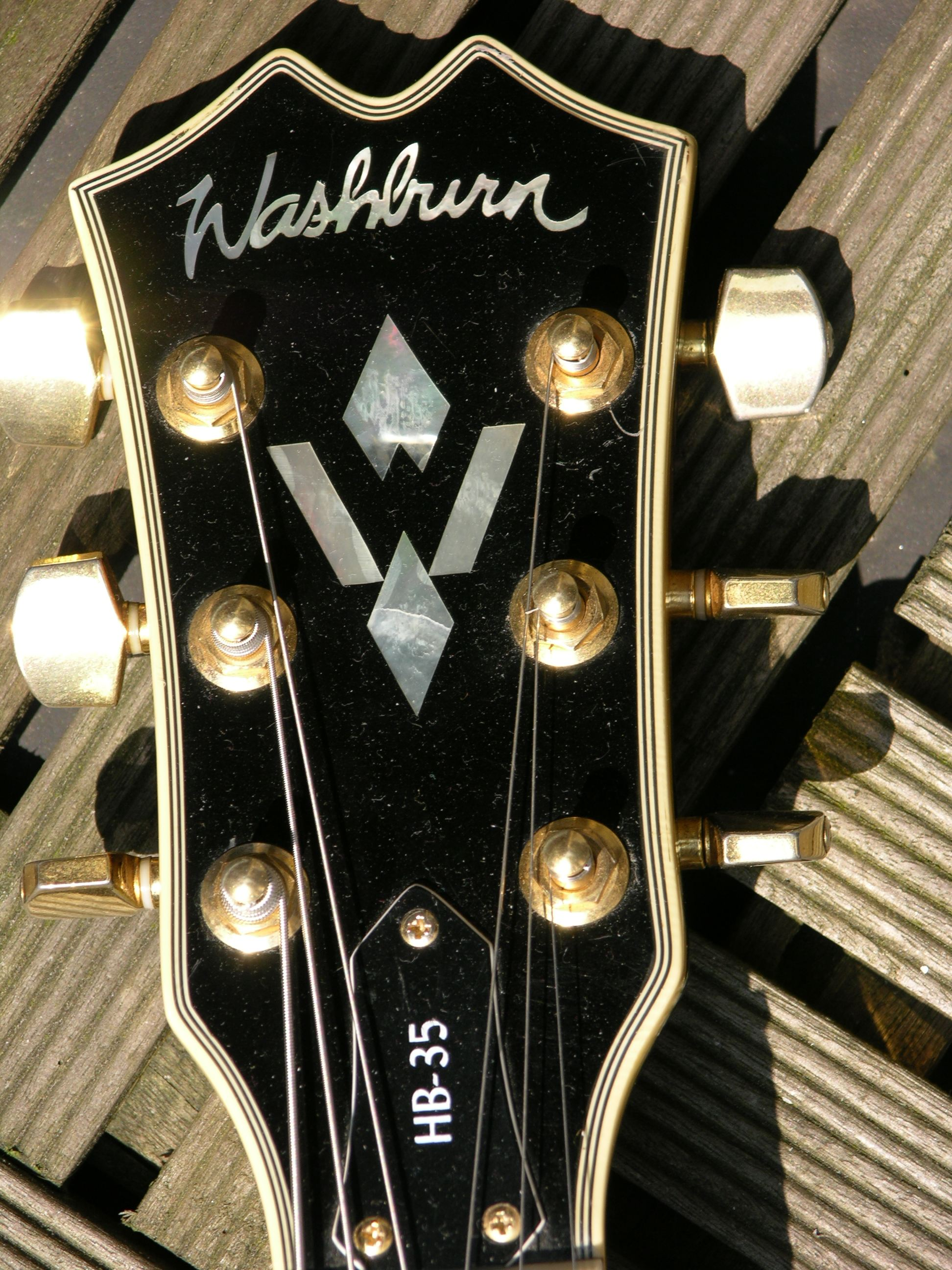
Typical headstock inlay

Beyond the fretboard inlay, the headstock and sound hole are also commonly inlaid. The manufacturer's logo is commonly inlaid into the headstock and pickguard, if present. Sometimes a small design such as a bird or other character or an abstract shape also accompanies the logo. The sound hole designs found on acoustic guitars vary from simple concentric circles to delicate fretwork. Many high-end guitars have more elaborate decorative inlay schemes. Often the edges of the guitar around the neck and body and down the middle of the back are inlaid.

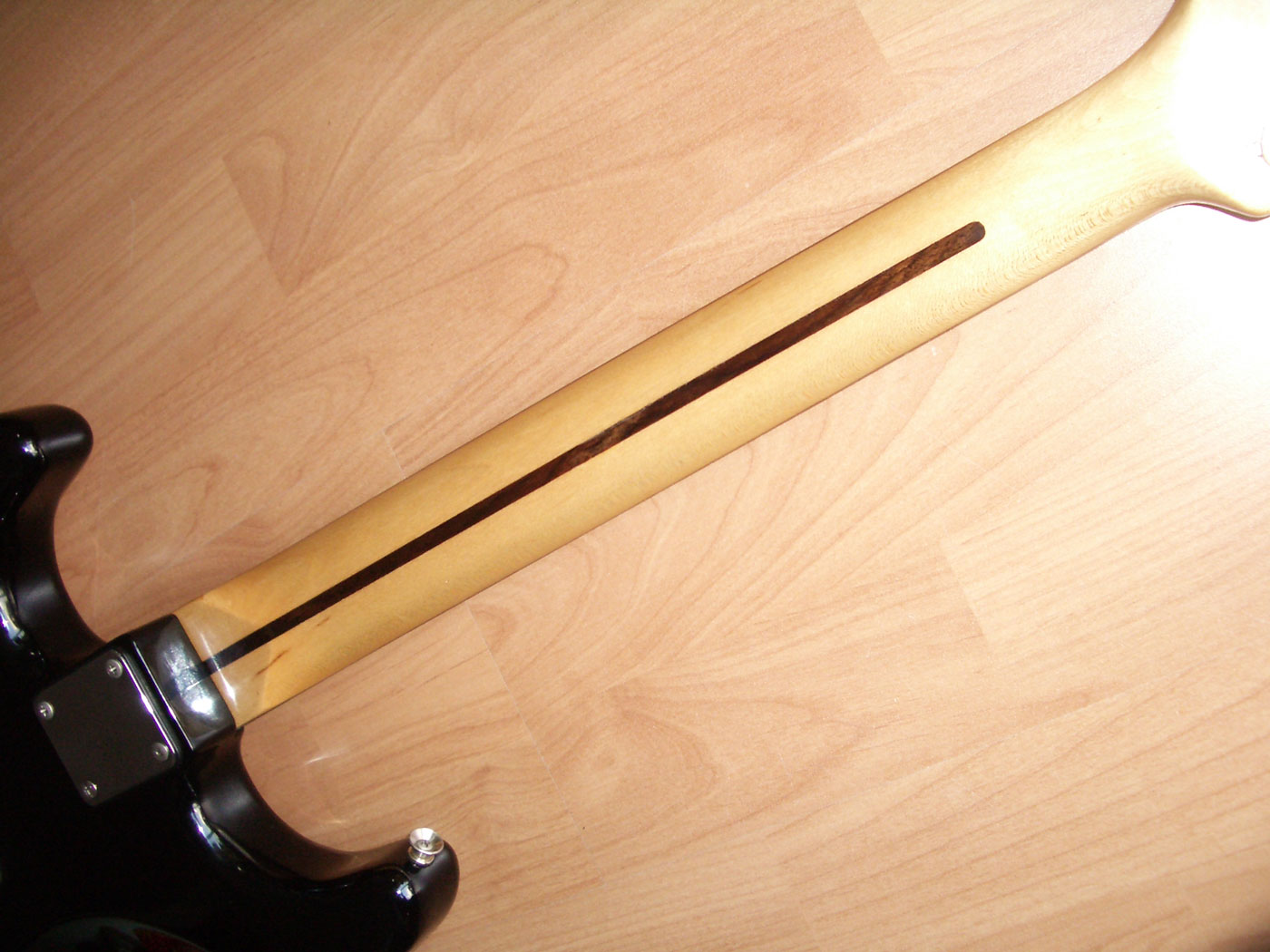
Skunk stripe inlay

Because some electric guitars (like the Fender Telecaster and Stratocaster) do not have a separate fretboard under which they can fit a truss rod, they fit it in the back of the neck and cover it with a strip of dark wood. This has popularly become known as a "skunk stripe," and while it is not inlay, some makers use inlay to simulate it.

== Sound hole ==
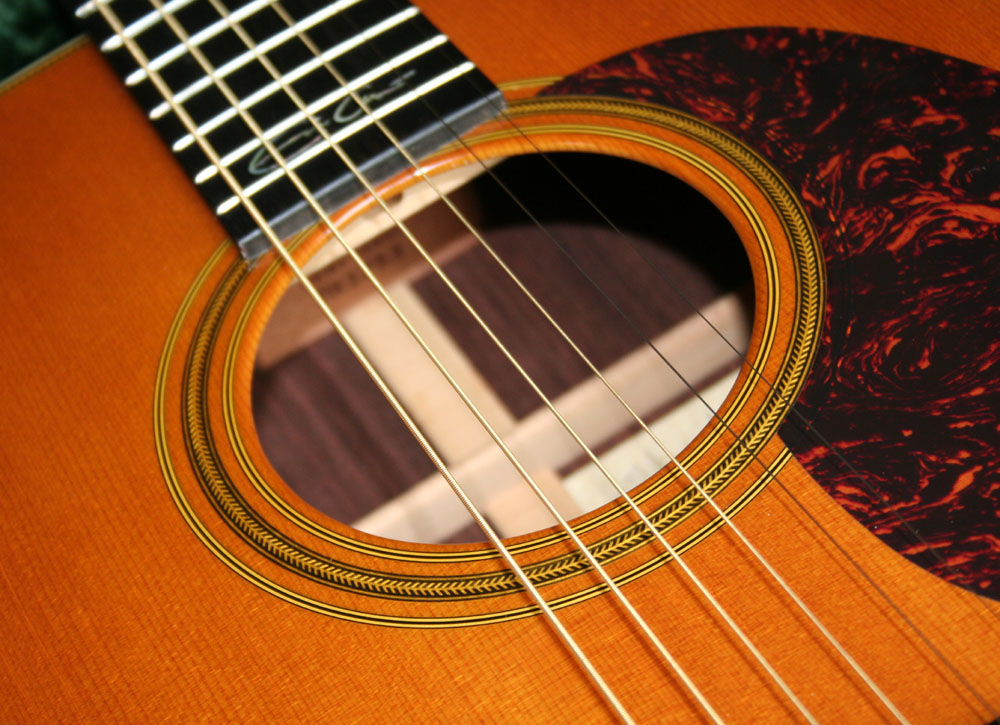
Inlay around sound hole of Martin guitar

The edge of the soundboard around the sound hole of an acoustic guitar is almost always decorated with a rosette inlay.

== Main body ==
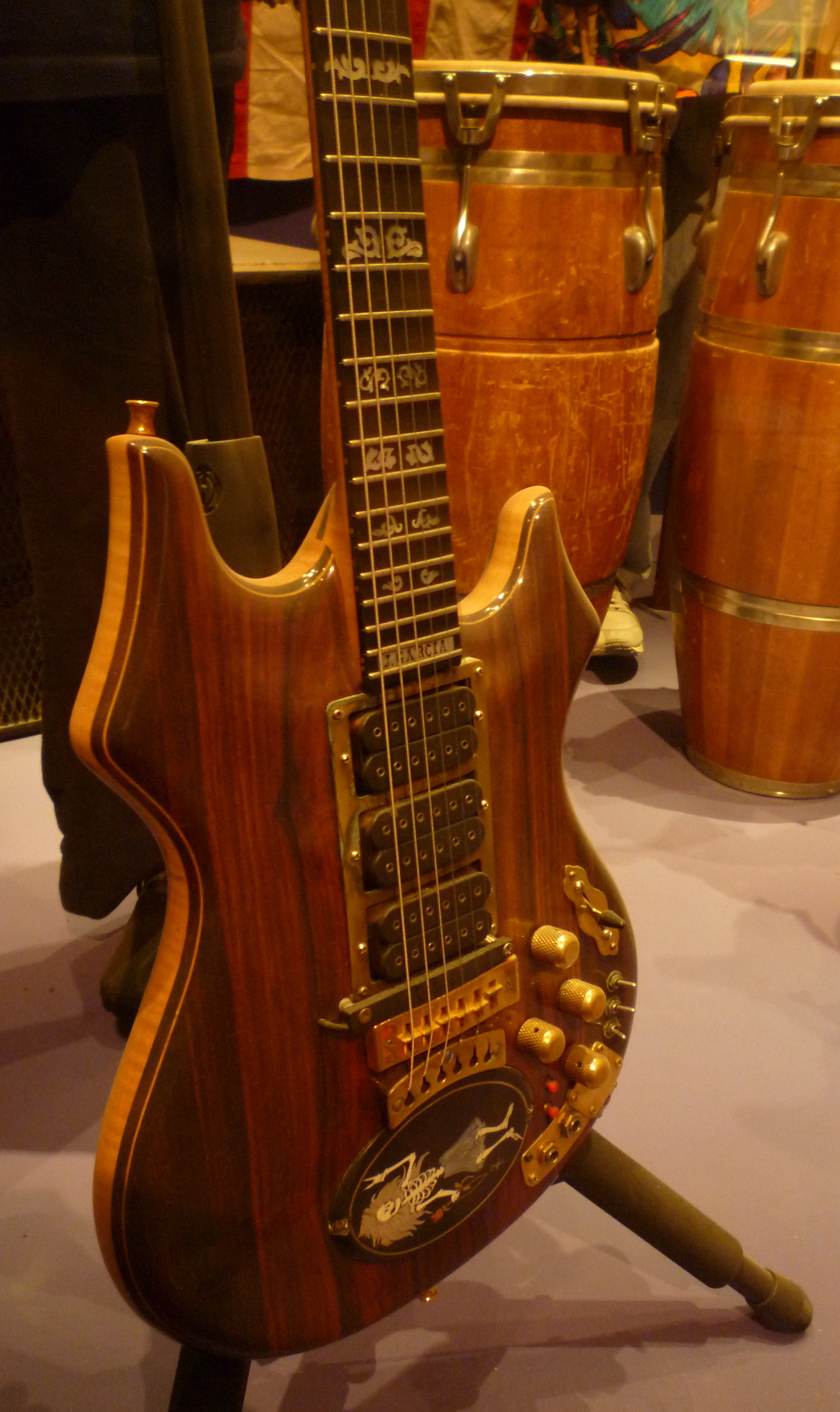
One of Jerry Garcia's guitars, named "Rosebud." Note the inlay work on the fret board and the dancing skeleton inlay work on the guitar's main body.

Many guitars also have inlays on the main guitar body itself, often for decorative purposes.

== Binding ==
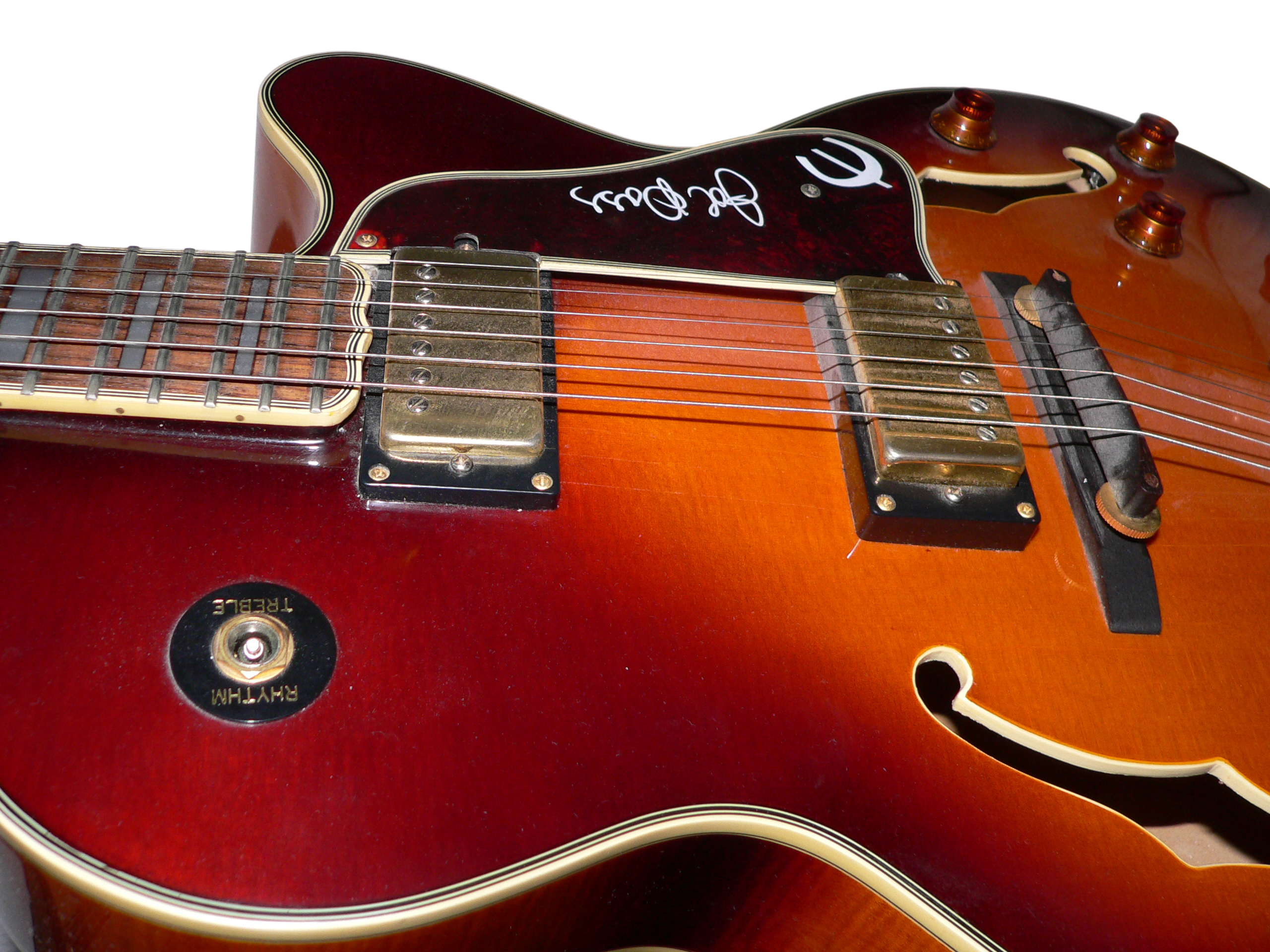
Close examination of this guitar's body shows intricate multi-layered bindings (white-black-white))

Binding on acoustic guitars serve to protect the edges of the wood from impact and, particularly where end grain would be exposed, moisture damage. After the back, front and sides are joined a small ledge is cut out on the edge which is then inlaid before finishing the guitar. On solid-body electric guitars it serves only a cosmetic purpose. Fretboards are sometimes also "bound".

== Purfling ==
Purfling is similar to binding, but differs in that it is offset a small distance from the edge surface. It is typically found around the edges of the front, back and sound holes of violins. Purfling helps prevent cracks at the edge from extending deeper into the wood.

== See also ==
- Robinson, Larry (2005-05-25) [1999]. The Art of Inlay: Design & Technique for Fine Woodworking. photography by Richard Lloyd (Rev. & Expand ed.). Backbeat Books. ISBN 978-0-87930-835-3.
- Guitar binding and purfling repair
- Guitar inlay repair
