= South Padre International Music Festival =

- Genre: country, funk, reggae, rock, indie, Latin rock, ska, bluegrass, Americana, hip hop and jazz
- Dates: 2008: October 31-November 2
- Locations: South Padre Island, Texas, United States
- Years active: 2007–present
- Founders: GamePlan Marketing & Events
- Website: www.spimusicfest.com

South Padre International Music Festival (also known as SPI Music Fest) is an annual 3-day music festival held on South Padre Island, Texas. The event features international and national artists, encompassing a wide range of musical genres including country, funk, reggae, rock, indie, Latin rock, ska and jazz. 2007 marked the inaugural year of SPI Music Fest with almost 10,000 visitors throughout the weekend. The festival producer is GamePlan Marketing & Events, a strategic marketing and advertising agency located in Austin, Texas.
The festival is set in a tropical atmosphere with temperatures averaging high 70s in late October and early November.

== History ==
When The South Padre Convention and Visitors Bureau had a goal to attract visitors during the fall off-season, it held a bidding for a music festival. GamePlan Marketing & Events was selected and began the process of producing a music festival that would help South Padre be a cultural entertainment destination, attracting worldwide tourism. Early visions for a music festival included concerts on the sand flats north of the South Padre Island Convention Centre. However, the producer and CVB agreed they wanted to put the concerts near the businesses to better help the local economy. November 2–4, 2007 marked the inaugural SPI Music Fest. The 2008 date for SPI Music Fest will occur on October 31-November 2.

== 2008 lineup ==
- Willie Nelson
- Foghat
- Los Lonely Boys
- Blue Öyster Cult
- Ghostland Observatory
- Steel Pulse
- Alejandro Escovedo
- Del Castillo
- Grupo Fantasma
- Fastball
- Sara Hickman
- Vallejo
- Airline
- meridianwest
- Nakia and his Southern Cousins
- Pelican West
- The Last Vegas
- Ginger Leigh
- Twanguero
- Bongodogs
- Stewart Mann & the Statesboro Revue
- James Speer
- Big Burn
- Brownout
- Phillip Thomas Kellogg
- Suzanna Choffel
- Eric Hanke
- Bree Stevens
- More to come…www.spimusicfest.com for updated lineup

== 2007 lineup ==
More than 60 bands in 14 venues were officially involved in the 2007 South Padre International Music Festival. Musical acts included:

- Jaguares
- Robert Earl Keen
- Robert Randolph & the Family Band
- Reckless Kelly
- Plastilina Mosh
- Grupo Fantasma
- Los Amigos Invisibles
- Dirty Dozen Brass Band
- Jumbo
- Patrice Pike
- Mike Doughty
- Trombone Shorty & Orleans Avenue
- Suzanna Choffel
- Jumbo
- Meridian West
- Boombox
- Big Burn
- Kathleen Braun
- Hope for the Stars
- Gerry's Kids
- Pelican West Band
- Stewart Mann
- Frontera Jazz Quartet
- Haydn Vitera
- Joy Davis
- Eric Hanke
- Third Coast
- Peoples Army
- Bongodogs
- Twanguero!
- Leslie Blasing
- Wesley Cox
- On the Roadside Allstars
- Honeybrowne
- Rabanes
- Bombasta
- Papa Mali
- Jesus War
- Danny Schmidt
- Ideophonic
- Brownout
- Carrie Elkin
- Two Tons of Steel
- The Authors
- Green Mountain Grass
- Amy Atchley
- Espina
- Billy Harvey
- Airline
- Homer Hiccolm & the Rocketboys
- Eidman Hall
- Nakia and his Southern Cousins
- Amy Cook
- Ruby James
- Pilaseca
- Miser
- Stereo Kitsch
- Slim Richey
- Jitterbug Vipers
- Leonhardt
- The Throwbacks
- The Gospel Silverstones
- Moving Matter
- DJ Gmau
- Philip Thomas Kellogg

== Weather ==
The average temperature for South Padre Island during the last week of October and the first week of November is 80' (average high) and 66' (average low).

== Gallery ==
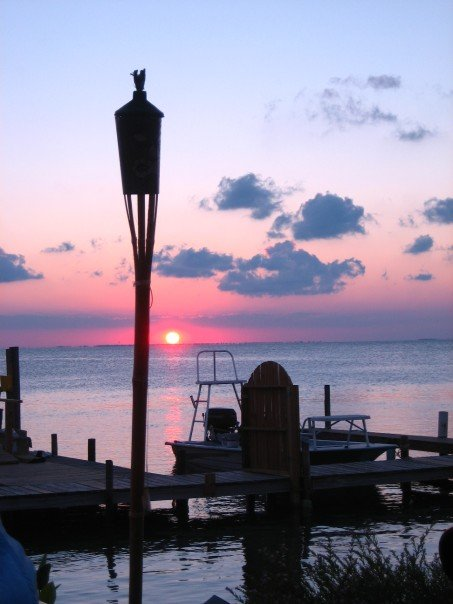
South Padre Island Sunset

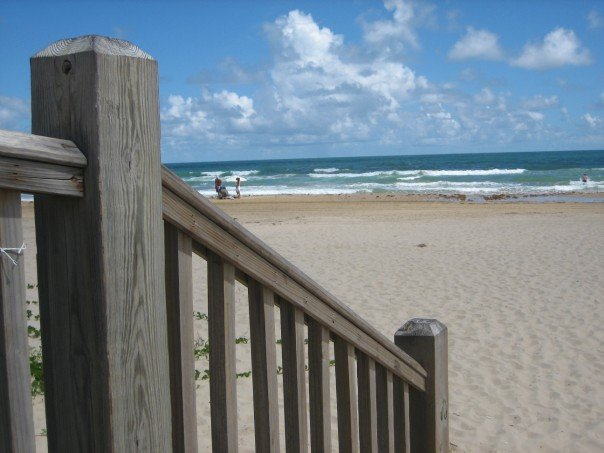
South Padre Island Beach

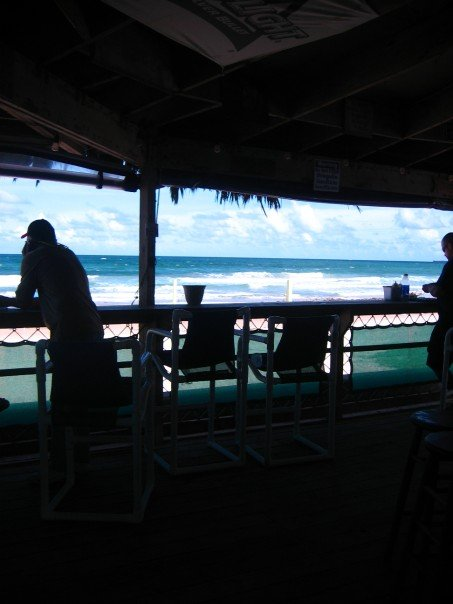
One of the smaller music venue on the beach

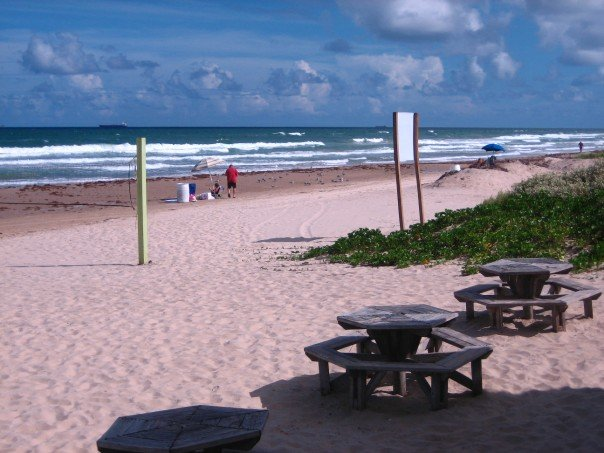
Beautiful day in November during SPI Music Fest

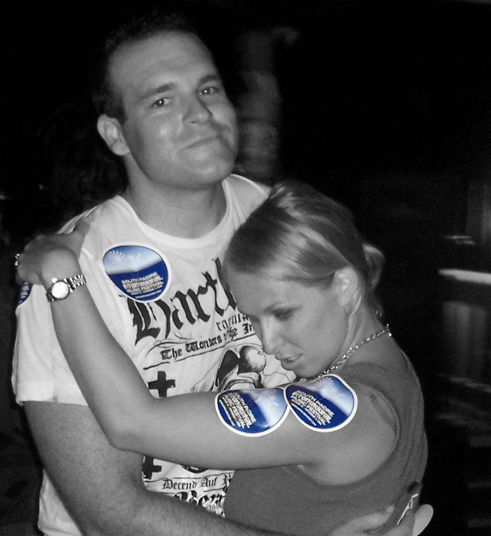
People posing with SPI Music Fest stickers July 4, 2008
