= Gibson ES-100 =

Electric guitar model by Gibson

The Gibson ES-100 is an archtop, hollow body electric guitar produced from 1937 to 1941 by Gibson. It was re-introduced as the Gibson ES-125 in 1946.
