= Los Horcones =

Mexican intentional community

- Intentional community
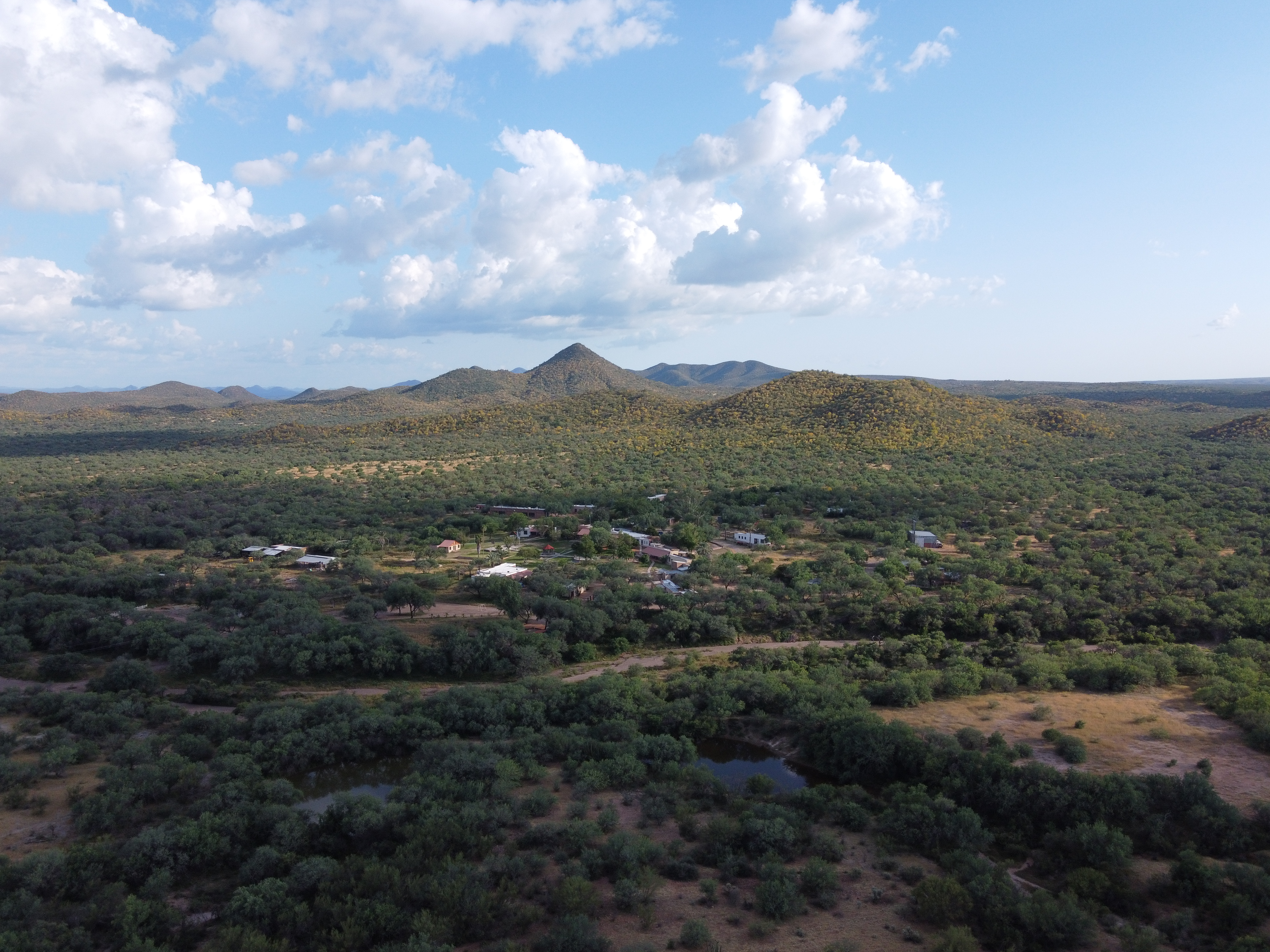
- Aerial view of Comunidad Los Horcones in La Colorada Municipality, Sonora, Mexico
- Interactive map of Los Horcones
- Coordinates: 28°44′04″N 110°25′12″W
- Country: Mexico
- State: Sonora
- Municipality: La Colorada
- Established: 1973

Population (1999)
  - Total: 13
- Website: https://www.loshorcones.org

Los Horcones is an intentional community located in La Colorada Municipality, Mexico (about 40 miles from Hermosillo) and inspired by B. F. Skinner's utopian novel Walden Two. The members of Los Horcones use techniques based on behavioral science to shape their own and each other's behaviors. They use those behavior-shaping techniques in politically coordinated ways and they do so in order to continuously improve themselves and their culture. They are striving to build a culture "based on cooperation, sharing, non-violence, equality and ecological sustainability". In 1999, a total of 13 people (the four founders and their children and grandchildren) lived in Los Horcones.

== An experimental community ==
Los Horcones can also be regarded as an experimental community. When the members of Los Horcones encounter problems they design and conduct experiments to test possible solutions to their problems. Depending on the result of an experiment, they may collectively resolve to make an experimental behavior into a community-approved component of their behavioral culture. In this way, the Los Horconans try to exercise control over the evolution of their culture.

== Behaviorology movement ==
The Behavior of Organisms, B. F. Skinner's first book, was published in 1938. The research strategy that Dr. Skinner presented in that book was widely adopted and grew into a school of psychology named the experimental analysis of behavior. That school is today known as behavior analysis.

As behavior analysis grew larger, a growing number of scholars began to believe that behavior analysis had outgrown its place in psychology and that it was time to establish a separate discipline. Makram Khalil Samaan gave expression to this belief in 1973 when he wrote, "It is time now for the scientific analysis of behavior to call for its own scientific discipline. It is contradictory to its function, objective, methods and content to stay within the realm of psychology." Mr. Samaan suggested that the scientific analysis of behavior become a separate scientific discipline named "behaviorology".

In 1974 the Los Horconans began using the term "behaviorology" to refer to "the natural science of behavior". Their summary of behaviorology reads as follows: "Behaviorology encompasses basic research, applied research and philosophy. Basic research includes (a) descriptive analysis of behavior (behaviography), (b) experimental analysis of behavior (experimental behaviorology), and (c) a theoretical or conceptual analysis of behavior (theoretical behaviorology). Applied research refers to behavior-analytic applications of the experimental analysis of behavior to the prevention and solution of social problems. As such, it includes (a) applied research in the form of experimental analysis oriented towards finding solutions to social problems and (b) behavioral technology, in the form of behavior-analytic procedures alone. The philosophy of behaviorology is that of behaviorism, which includes both, philosophical (or metatheoretical) assumptions and the philosophical implications of data obtained by the experimental analysis of behavior and its applications."

The International Behaviorology Association (TIBA) held its second convention at Los Horcones in January 1990. To accommodate that convention, the Los Horconans built a convention hall and several residential buildings.

== Legal structure ==
From a legal perspective, Los Horcones is a corporation. The corporation's full name is Comunidad de los Horcones. It was organized in 1973 and it operates under the laws of the state of Sonora. Los Horcones is a producer cooperative.

== Location ==
The corporation owns a parcel of land that contains approximately 260 acres (110 hectares). That parcel is approximately 1,312 feet (400 meters) above sea level. The members of Los Horcones live in buildings which are located on that parcel. Most of those buildings are grouped together on the southern half of the parcel. The parcel is bounded on its northern border by Mexican Federal Highway 16 (Carretera Federal 16). The drive from Hermosillo, capital of the State of Sonora, takes about 45 minutes.

== Population ==
In 1999, Los Horcones was populated by 13 people: its four founders (two married couples), seven of their children, and two of their grandchildren. At the time, children in the community were homeschooled and would often audit university courses in Tucson, Arizona after earning their high-school diplomas. Subjects taught to students at Los Horcones included Spanish, English, mathematics, and behavior analysis.

== See also ==
- Twin Oaks Community
- Dandelion Community
