= Danny Schmidt =

American musician

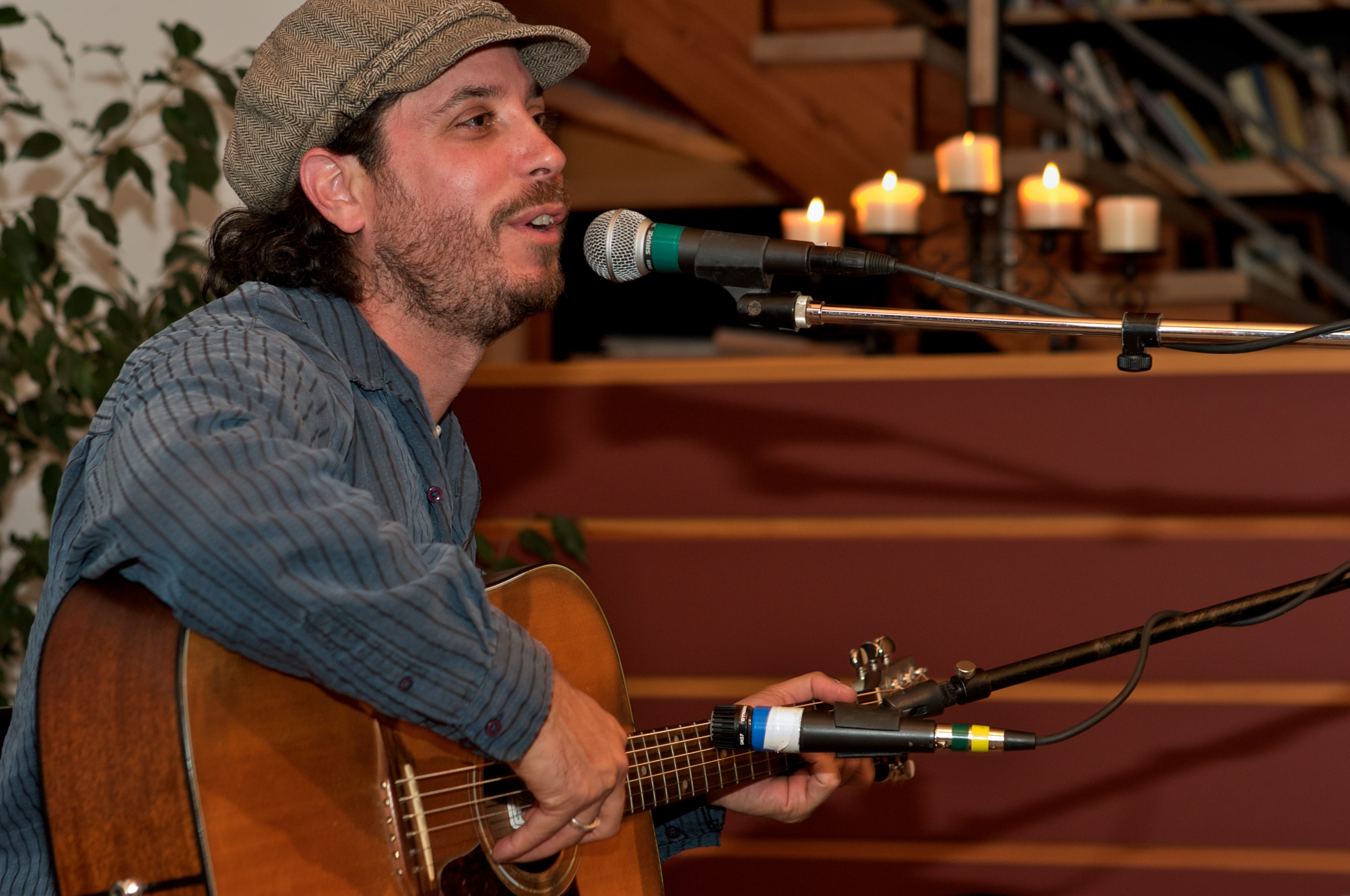
- Schmidt playing a house concert in Boalsburg, PA in 2008.

Background information
- Born: Danny Schmidt; October 7, 1970 (age 55); Austin, Texas, US
- Origin: Austin, Texas
- Genres: Folk, indie folk
- Instruments: vocals, guitar
- Years active: 1996–present
- Labels: Red House, Waterbug
- Website: dannyschmidt.com

Danny Schmidt (born October 7, 1970) is an American singer-songwriter based in Austin, Texas, where he now lives with his wife, fellow musician and singer-songwriter Carrie Elkin.

== Biography ==
Schmidt was born in 1970 and grew up in Austin, Texas. He started playing guitar at the age of 12. At age 20, he discovered that he liked the blues after tracking the music of Jimi Hendrix back through Muddy Waters, Mississippi John Hurt, and Lightning Hopkins all the way to old country gospel and spirituals. He bought an acoustic guitar and eventually discovered Bob Dylan, Neil Young, Tom Waits, and John Prine, from whom he learned songwriting.

After three years of college, he joined the East Wind Community in the Ozark Mountains of southern Missouri for a year. He then became part of the Twin Oaks Community in the Blue Ridge Mountains of Virginia for about four years, where he met fellow singer-songwriter Devon Sproule. At 25, Schmidt began writing songs — a developing talent which ultimately earned him the 2007 Kerrville Folk Festival New Folk award.

In 1999, he settled for a while in Charlottesville, Virginia where his songwriting flourished and he started sharing his songs with the public. That year he released his first recording, an album titled Live at the Prism Coffeehouse. In 2001 he released Enjoying the Fall. 2003 brought his third collection of songs, Make Right the Time. In 2005, Schmidt released Parables & Primes. 2007 saw the release of Little Grey Sheep and 2009 the release of Instead the Forest Rose to Sing—his first release on Red House Records. In 2011, Schmidt released Man of Many Moons, also on Red House.

Schmidt was a part of the original King of My Living Room group of Charlottesville songwriters—which included such artists as Brady Earnhart, Danny Schmidt, Stratton Salidis, Jan Smith, Lance Brenner, Browning Porter, and Jeff Romano—who would go on to do a series of concerts together, the first CD of which was recorded in 2001. He's appeared in each of the four performances since, including the latest November 2007 at the Gravity Lounge in Charlottesville.

The debut King of My Living Room performance in Charlottesville convinced fellow singer-songwriter Paul Curreri to make his home there. Schmidt, Curreri, and Sproule became housemates, with Paul and Devon marrying soon after. Curreri later wrote and recorded a letter in song form to Danny, who responded with the yet-to-be-produced song Two Guitars, which he began performing live in 2009. Danny recorded his fifth album Little Grey Sheep (2008) in the Curreri/Sproule home, with Curreri serving as a production engineer.

In 2005 Schmidt toured up and down the east and west coasts, as well as in Alaska, the United Kingdom, Italy, The Netherlands, France, and Italy.

In 2012, his song "This Too Shall Pass" was featured in the weather section of episode 8 of the popular podcast Welcome to Night Vale. His song "Echo in the Hills", performed alongside Carrie Elkin, was also featured in the podcast on August 1, 2014. In early 2015, Schmidt toured with the crew of the podcast, performing live versions of his songs with Elkin, as a part of their live episodes.

== Religion ==
Born into a Jewish family, Schmidt does not feel his religion is either distinct or critical to understanding his art. As he puts it, when discussing his song "Sad Songs Walking":

As for any personal notes on this song... this is the first song that made me worry about how Christian imagery was gonna affect my Jewish family. Was I gonna be misconstrued as "goin' Jesus" on my people? This song's kinda campy, so I didn't take the concern too deeply to heart. But it certainly did cross my mind quite a few times as I shared the first recordings with various chosen families.

And it has been an issue for me, actually, with a bunch of later songs... the fear of being identified as something I'm not, or as believing in something I don't. 'Cause really, my religious, philosophical, and political belief systems don't fit into any traditional nomenclature – as I suspect most people don't. But it's a vulnerable position, putting little snippets of expression out there for your loved ones, and others, to extrapolate from.

Anyway, the Jesus part doesn't mean anything. I'm no more Christian in my heart than I am Jewish than I am Buddhist. And no less.

== Recordings ==
Schmidt's album Little Grey Sheep (2008) was #1 Album on the Folk DJ Charts (FOLKDJ-L forum radio playlists) for February 2008 with four songs from the release: "Company Of Friends", "Leaves Are Burning", "Drawing Board", and "Tales Of Sweet Odysseus". A collection of songs from his 2009 release Instead the Forest Rose To Sing made it No. 1 Album on the Folk DJ Charts again for March and April 2009; ranking No. 2 in May 2009. Plays of songs from his 2011 release Man Of Many Moons — i.e., "Man Of Many Moons", "Houses Sing", "Buckets Of Rain", "Ragtime Ragtime Blues" — ranked it No. 3 Album played for February 2011, the month it was released. This made three Schmidt albums in a row to rate highly on these lists.

Of Schmidt's 2015 release Owls, Frank Gutch of No Depression said, "Danny Schmidt is a lyric machine. He tells stories. He creates magic — good and bad. He goes places I did not know existed."

== Musical style ==
Danny Schmidt's writing spans from deeply rooted Appalachian mountain gospel to English balladry, from syncopated Piedmont country blues to vagabond protest folk-stumpery. His main influences are Townes Van Zandt, Bob Dylan, Leonard Cohen, Neil Young, and Dave Carter. In the Spring 2008 issue of Sing Out! magazine, journalist Matt Watroba noted that Schmidt's arrangements are powerful, his performances are laid-back yet energetic, while his lyrics are sheer poetry.

Stylistically and musically, Danny's writing spans an impressively diverse reach, from deeply-rooted Appalachian mountain gospel to haunted English balladry, from syncopated Piedmont country blues to vagabond 60's protest folk-stumpery. He tackles universal themes of love, loss, and longing . . . restless discontent and grateful joy. And he captures both the sorrow and the beauty inherent in our everyday lives with the wisdom of a perceptive, compassionate elder and with the innocent awe and tenderness of a child.

— South Padre International Music Festival

With beautifully crafted, lonesome pines music and complex beguiling words, he would've fitted neatly on the bill at any '60s coffee house alongside Townes Van Zandt or Leonard Cohen.

— Andy Fyfe, Q Magazine

The songs are fascinating and intriguing, even mysterious. The singing is warm and unassuming, letting the stories lead him. The melodies are captivating.

— Marilyn Rea Beyer, WUMB

== Awards, honors, distinctions ==
- In July 2010, Chicago Tribune music reviewer Rich Warren declared him one of the 50 most significant singer-songwriters of folk in the last 50 years, together with other such notable singer-songwriters as Harry Chapin, Leonard Cohen, Judy Collins, Bob Dylan, and John McCutcheon.
- He was one of six winners of the 2007 Grassy Hill Kerrville New Folk award selected from 32 finalists who performed during the 2007 Grassy Hill Kerrville New Folk Concerts on May 26 & 27.
- He was part of the original King of My Living Room group of Charlottesville songwriters—which has come to include such notable artists as Paul Curreri and Devon Sproule—the first CD of which recorded in 2001. He's appeared in their performances since, including the latest November 2007 at the Gravity Lounge in Charlottesville.

== Personal ==
Schmidt is married to singer-songwriter Carrie Elkin who gave birth to their first child in 2016. They live together in Austin.

== Discography ==
Discography list
- Live at the Prism Coffeehouse (ASIN: B00001ZWI8)
  - Released: August 24, 1999
  - Format: CD
  - Label: The Orchard
  - Writer: Danny Schmidt
  - Tracks: 15
- Enjoying the Fall (ASIN: B00005RTQX)
  - Released: November 13, 2001
  - Format: CD
  - Label: Live Once Records
  - Writer: Danny Schmidt
  - Tracks: 13
- King of My Living Room (2001) (ASIN: B000CAFY5Y)
  - Released: August 20, 2002
  - Format: CD
  - Label: CD Baby
  - Writer: Various Artists
  - Tracks: 16
- Make Right the Time (ASIN: B000CAGHXW)
  - Released: 2003
  - Format: CD
  - Label: Live Once Records
  - Writer: Danny Schmidt
  - Tracks: 11
- King of My Living Room (2003) (ASIN: unknown)
  - Released: 2003
  - Format: CD
  - Label: CD Baby
  - Writer: Various Artists
- Parables & Primes (ASIN: B000A2H5K6)
  - Released: 2005
  - Format: CD
  - Label: Live Once Records (2005), Tin Angel Records (2007)
  - Writer: Danny Schmidt
  - Tracks: 11
- Little Grey Sheep (ASIN: B000YHL8K0)
  - Released: 2008
  - Format: CD
  - Label: Waterbug
  - Writer: Danny Schmidt
  - Producer: Paul Curreri
  - Tracks: 12
- Our Christmas Present (ASIN: unknown)
  - Released: 2008
  - Format: CD
  - Label: CD Baby
  - Writer: Various Artists
  - Producer: Our Community Place
  - Tracks: 15
- Instead the Forest Rose to Sing (ASIN: B001QBC2C6)
  - Released: March 10, 2009
  - Format: CD
  - Label: Red House
  - Writer: Danny Schmidt
  - Tracks: 10
- Man of Many Moons (ASIN: B004H1Z76U)
  - Released: February 8, 2011
  - Format: CD
  - Label: Red House
  - Writer: Danny Schmidt
  - Tracks: 11
- Owls
  - Released: 2015
  - Format: CD
  - Label: None—independently released
  - Writer: Danny Schmidt
  - Tracks: 11
- Standard Deviation
  - Released: 2019
  - Format: CD
  - Label: Live Once Records
  - Writer: Danny Schmidt
  - Tracks: 10

== See also ==
- Red House Records
- Twin Oaks Community
- East Wind Community
