= Devon Sproule =

American singer-songwriter

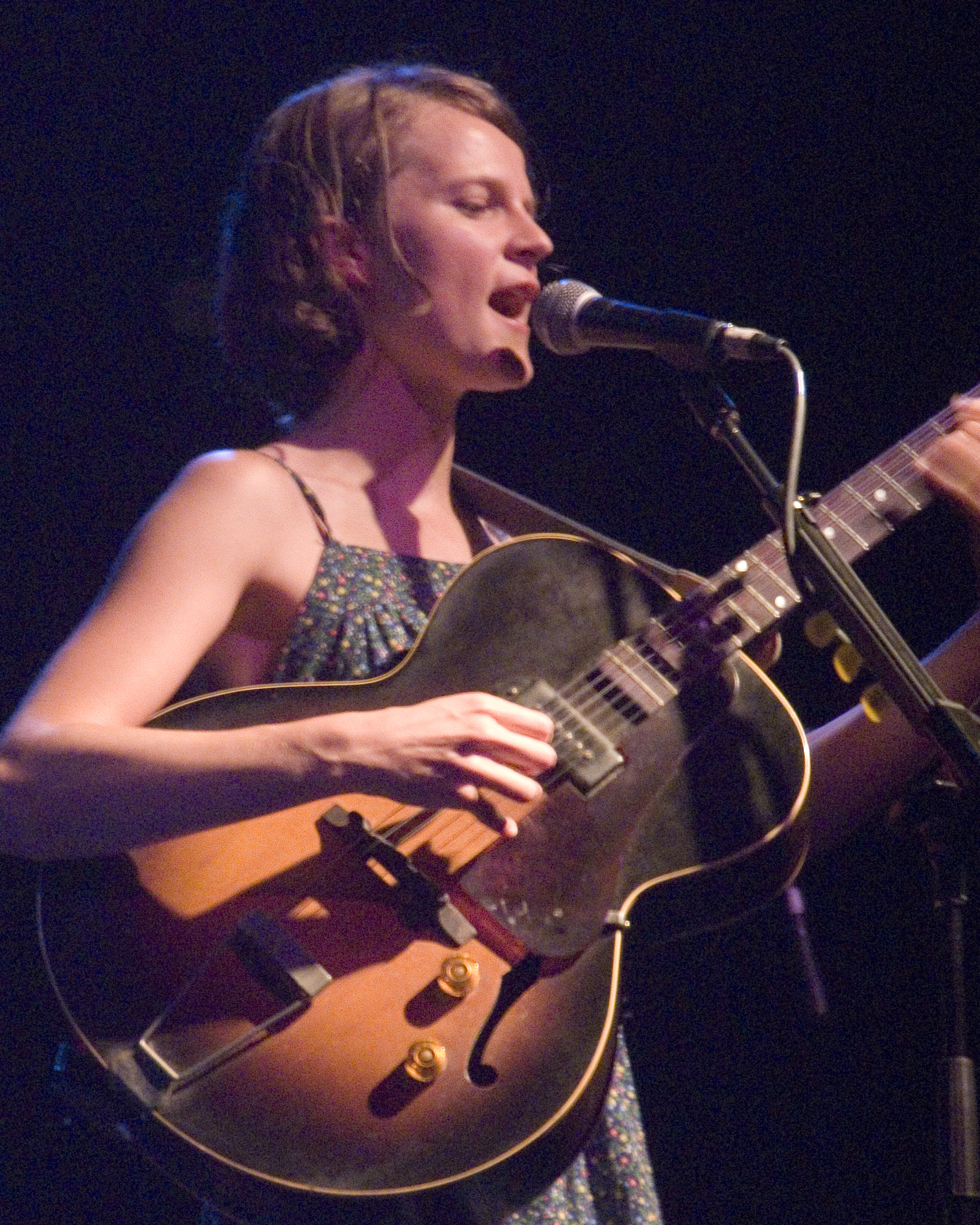
- 23 August 2006

Background information
- Born: 23 April 1982 (age 44)
- Origin: Kingston, Ontario, Canada
- Genres: Folk, Indie folk
- Occupations: Singer-songwriter, musician
- Instruments: Guitar, vocals
- Years active: 1999–present
- Labels: Tin Angel, Black Hen
- Website: www.devonsproule.com

Devon Sproule (born 23 April 1982) is a folk and indie rock singer-songwriter and musician based in Charlottesville, Virginia. She shared the ASCAP Foundation Sammy Cahn Award for 2009 with Oren Lavie. She is married to fellow musician, and music producer, Paul Curreri.

After birth of their daughter in 2016, Sproule returned to touring with the release of The Gold String in early 2017.

== Early life ==
Born to hippie parents on a commune named Dandelion in Kingston, Ontario, Sproule claims citizenship of both Canada and the United States. Her parents were both musicians. She spent her childhood on the 465-acre (1.88 km^{2}), 100-member Twin Oaks Community founded in 1967 as an intentional community and ecovillage in Louisa County, Virginia. Asked about how the experience has affected her musical career, she said:

. . growing up with 80+ adults (many of whom I was very close to and spent lots of one-on-one time with) creates a need for versatile communication. . . in whatever manner will get the job done . . growing up in an income-free environment, the lack of money never bothers me much . .

After moving between private, public and home schooling, she eventually left high school, recorded her first record, and began touring nationally – all before the age of eighteen.

== Career ==
By 25, Sproule had already released four albums, drawing from influences as diverse as Frank Zappa, Bikini Kill, and a range of Canadian folk music.

A year after releasing her debut album Devon in 1999, she attracted the attention of fellow Charlottesville resident Dave Matthews who offered her a spot on a tour with the Dave Matthews Band. Bassist Stefan Lessard produced her next album Long Sleeve Story in 2001. The release of Upstate Songs in 2003 coincided with a move to upstate New York. The edgier sound, with a more folk-driven feel, represented a departure – and helped her gain national prominence.

Upstate Songs was critically acclaimed with Rolling Stone Magazine naming it to their Critics Top Albums of 2003. Julie Gerstein called the record, "perhaps the sweetest and most honest folk-pop album recorded this year," and added, "Sproule's vocal and lyrical beauty is unmatched."

At a show in Charlottesville, fellow musician Paul Curreri jumped on stage with her and joined in singing. They married in 2005 and often performed together locally. They also tour together across the United States and United Kingdom. They were regular favorites at the now-defunct Gravity Lounge, a major platform for new talent in their hometown. Curreri often "sings, plays, mixes, and produces" his wife's recordings.

In September 2011 Sproule and Curreri moved to Berlin, Germany, citing professional and economic reasons. "It felt like a good career move, to not just grow careers, but to make money, which is hard when you're going back and forth," says Sproule. "It's really fun to play over there where you can play the folk shows, but you can also play a little theater of 20-year-olds who are sitting on the floor and they're blogging about it the next day."

After living in Austin for a time, they've returned to Charlottesville. As Sproule says, "Everything that led away from Virginia felt necessary, and so did the coming home."

Moving away from recording albums, much of Sproule's new music is available through Patreon as of 2025.

== Recordings ==
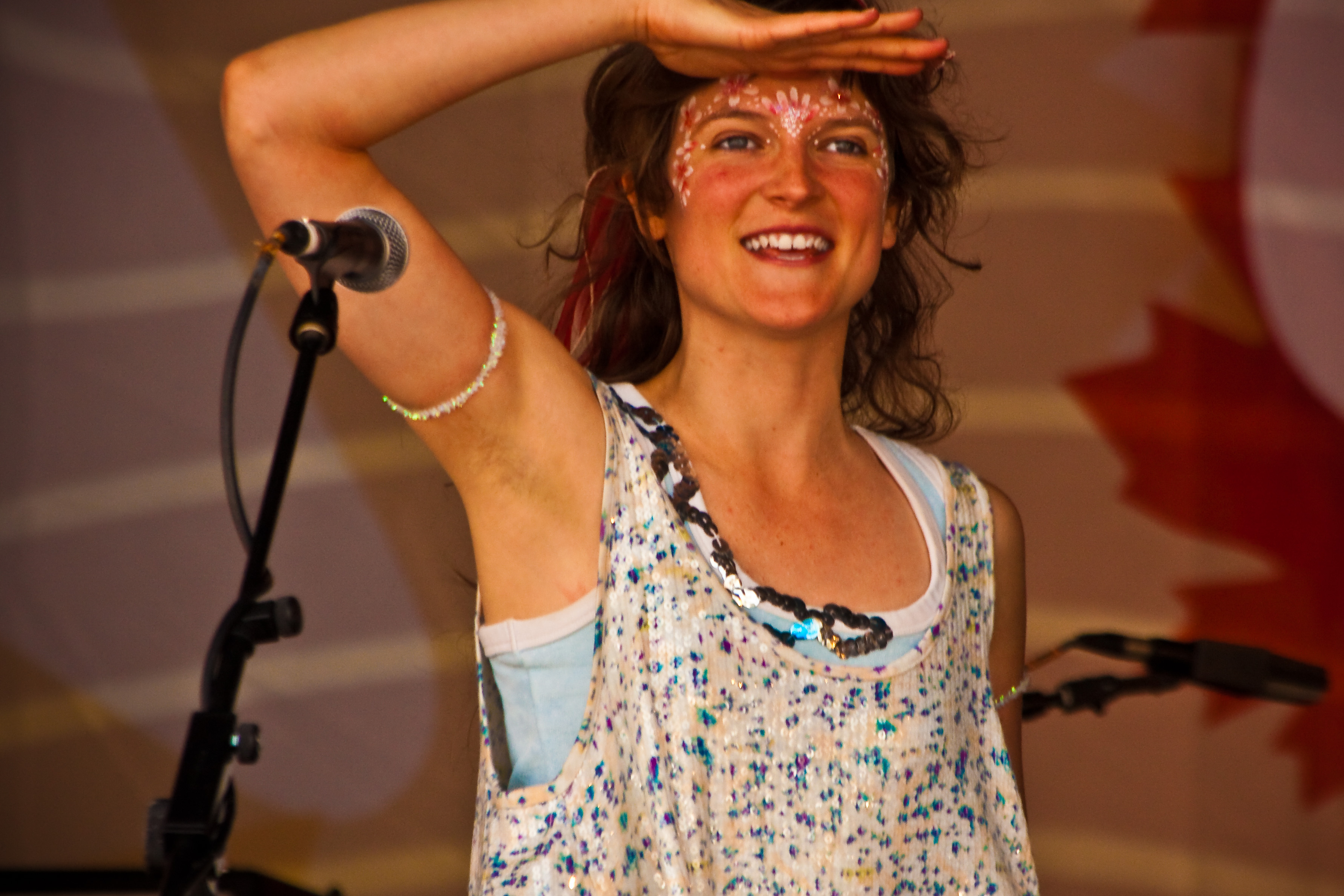
On stage at Canada Day festival Trafalgar Square London 2011

She released her first album when she was 16. Her second album, Long Sleeve Story, was released in 2001 with praise from The Village Voice. Upstate Songs, released in 2003, made it in Rolling Stone's Critics Top Albums of the year, followed by Keep Your Silver Shined in March 2007. She and Paul Curreri performed two tracks from the album, Old Virginia Block and Stop By Anytime, on the BBC's renowned Later With Jools Holland show in 2007.

¡Don't Hurry for Heaven! was released in April 2009. Live in London, recorded with a collection of musicians including English pedal steel player BJ Cole, was released in 2010. I Love You Go Easy was released on Tin Angel Records in 2011 to further critical acclaim, accompanied by the single Now's the Time. It features a cover of Terre Roche's Runs in the Family.

In the spring of 2013, Devon went into the studio in Toronto to record an album of songs co-written with Canadian singer-songwriter Mike O'Neill. A video for the song You Can't Help It was released in the summer and the resulting record, Colours, was released in September 2013. Musicians featuring on the record include Thom Gill and Robin Dann.

Sproule announced her return to touring, after birth of her daughter in 2016, with The Gold String, released 24 March 2017. The LP contains "North American music with weirdo roots" and was recorded in three Canadian provinces — Yukon, Ontario, and Nova Scotia — and the Shetland Islands. It features backing from "Toronto dream-poppers" Bernice and Sproule's husband Paul Curreri. The idea for the album began with a stay in remote the Shetland islands off Scotland "when she first started following a thread."

As Jane Dunlap Sathe of The Daily Progress stated:

An idea as simple and linear as a string led to a complex realization of precious connectedness to all the people who have shaped her life and all the spaces where love has been.

"The Gold String" started as a song and then the concept developed into an album.

== Tours and festivals ==
Sproule began touring nationally she was eighteen with the Dave Matthews Band. She tours across the United States, Canada, and United Kingdom regularly – often with her husband Paul Curreri. In 2011 Sproule performed at the Bergenfest in Norway and the Canada Day festival in Trafalgar Square, London. She has appeared at numerous other music festivals in her career.

Of course, I love playing guitar — especially now that my husband and friends have given me, for my birthday, the perfect addition to my collection: a 1954 Gibson ES-125. It's a jazz guitar and while I'm certainly not a jazz guitarist, I steal absolutely as much as I can from the genre!

— Devon Sproule

== Style and sound ==
Sproule's music shares elements of indie, folk, country, and jazz.

. . Devon Sproule favours slinky jazzy chords and has the immaculate timing and poised delivery of a first-class jazz singer. . and there's no shortage of sass. But the Great American Songs Devon sings are her own Great American Songs.

— Alan Brownlee, Manchester Evening News

There's plenty of harmonica, fiddle and banjo for the folk/country fan, but what comes through more strongly than any genre is the personal stamp of Devon herself; beautifully sparse arrangements like delicate spun-sugar constructions, and melodies that surprise the ear when you first hear them, but which then get under your skin much more than anything more obvious would.

— Miriam Craig, BBC

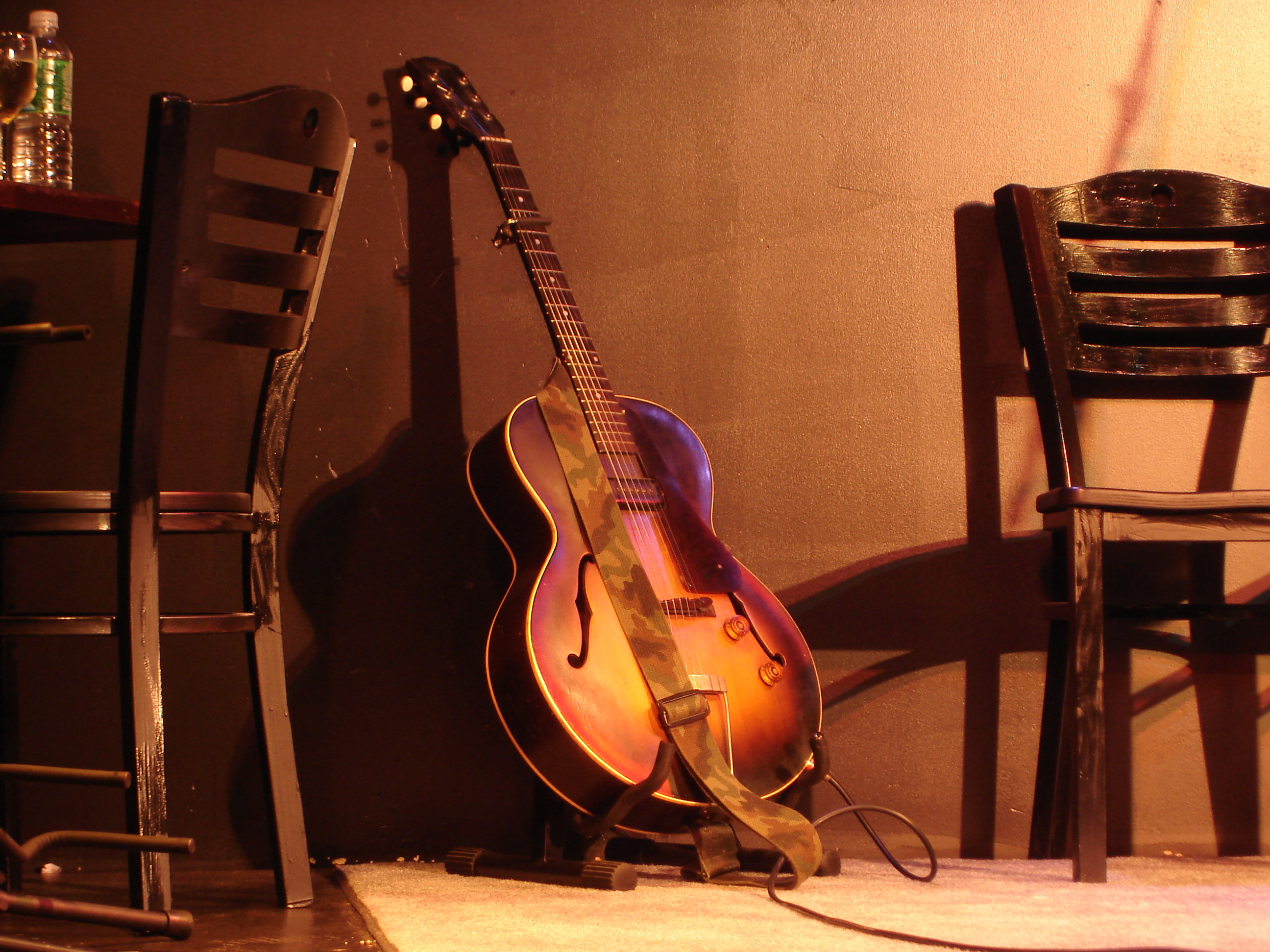
Devon's 1954 Gibson ES-125 Image by Timothy Caldwell

There's a refreshing sweetness about the work of this Canadian-American songwriter – there in her mellifluous vocals and poetic, freewheeling lyrics that, in the way of Bjork and Joanna Newsom, are more blank verse than rhyming schemes. Sproule's songs ooze the atmosphere of balmy Virginia days – she grew up in a commune in the state – and her sunny outlook is infectious.

— Neil Spencer, Observer

Sproule's songs are something to behold: Victoria Williams' playfulness and spunk meeting up with Joni Mitchell's confessional songwriting chops. To top it off, this is the sexiest, sultriest southern album since Lucinda's Car Wheels on a Gravel Road.

— Paste

The whole album brims with that kind of realist sentimentality—ten-cent yellow hat, rotten fruit kicked off a path, groundhog eating the lettuce right out of the ground, idly thinking about going to see a jazz band in town. Its styles range smoothly from jazz-standard (cello, clarinet) to bluegrass and folk (banjo, fiddle, harmonica) and beyond. Paramount are Sproule's voice and a mood of homespun authority, happiness laced with a hint of pain, leavened with humor.

— The New Yorker, Keep Your Silver Shined

== Instrument ==
Sproule performs on a 1954 Gibson ES-125.

== Personal ==
Sproule married musician, singer-songwriter, and music producer Paul Curreri in 2005. They live together in Charlottesville. Their daughter Ray Lee Curreri was born in August 2016.

== Discography ==
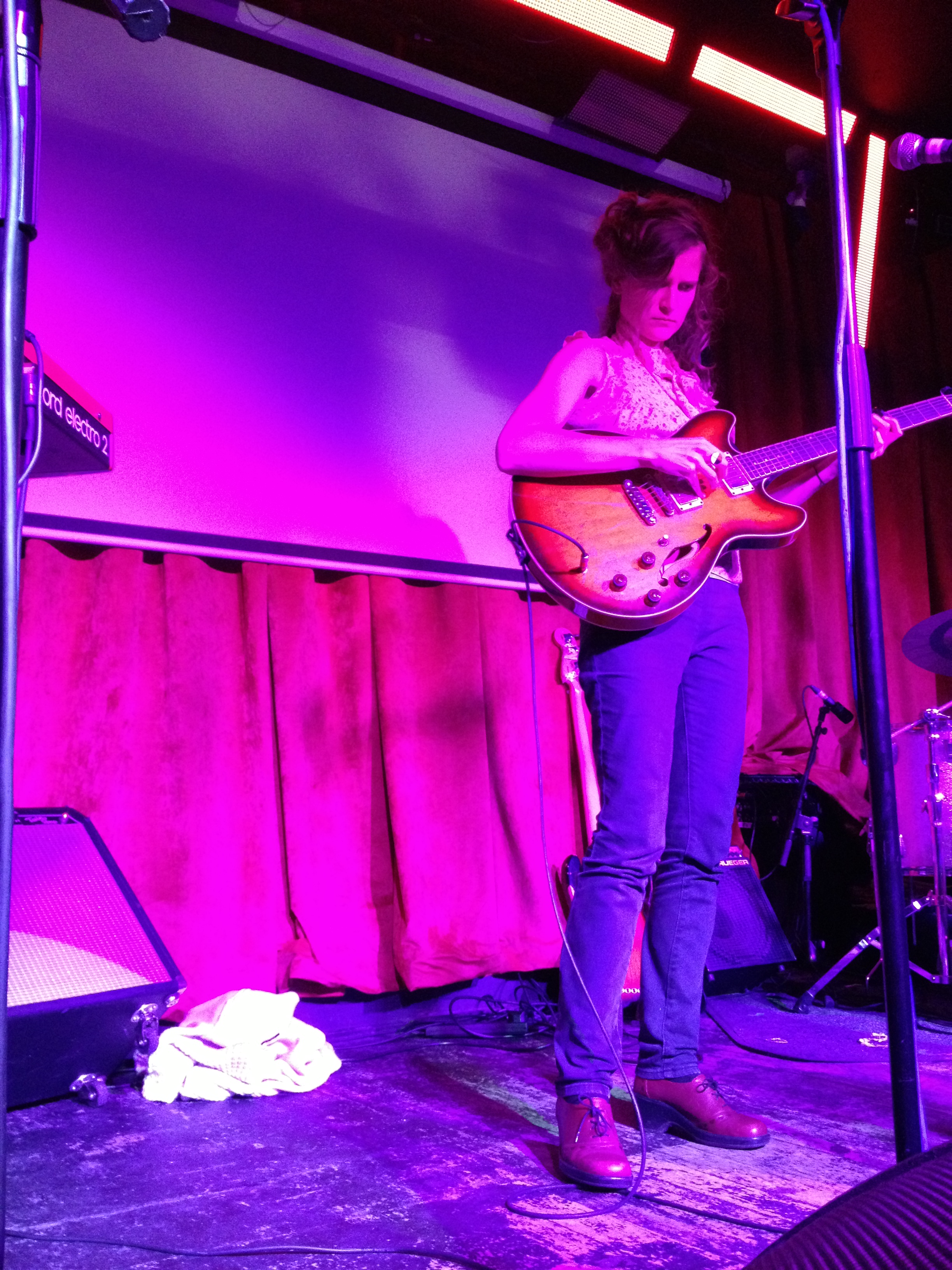
Hoxton Square Bar, London, UK, 2013

- Devon (1999) on Three Word Records.
- Long Sleeve Story (2001) on Three Word Records.
- Upstate Songs (2003) on City Salvage Records.
- Keep Your Silver Shined (2007) on Waterbug Records.
- Don't Hurry for Heaven (2009) on Tin Angel Records.
- Live in London (2010) on Tin Angel Records.
- I Love You, Go Easy (2011) on Tin Angel Records.
- Colours (2013) with Mike O'Neill on Tin Angel Records.
- The Gold String (2017) on Tin Angel Records.

== Distinctions and awards ==
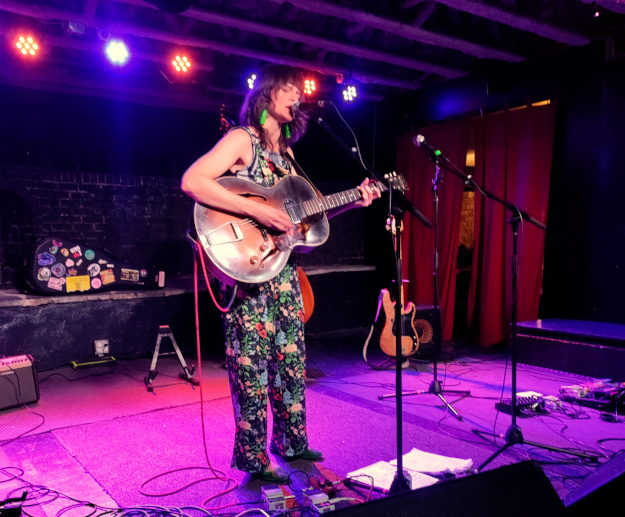
Devon Sproule at the Southern Cafe in Charlottesville VA February 8, 2025

- Upstate Songs (City Salvage Records) was included in Rolling Stone's Critics Top Albums of 2003.
- Her future husband, singer-songwriter Paul Curreri dedicated his 2003 Songs for Devon Sproule CD on Tin Angel / City Salvage to her.
- Best Solo Music Act "Sweet, breathy vocals; a fetching, gentle stage presence; local roots with a capital 'L'; talent that just won't quit. You love Belmont-based songstress Devon Sproule the best, but with the success of her second record, Keep Your Silver Shined (she calls it her "getting married" album), she sure does travel a lot, so keep your calendars shined for her next local gig." — Best of C-Ville 2007.
- She taught songwriting at the Third Annual NewSong Academy in August 2007 Shepherdstown, West Virginia.
- She was nominated in the Emerging Artist category of the third annual Folk Alliance awards show broadcast 20 February 2008 from Memphis, Tennessee (simulcast on XM).
- She was one of six 2008 Grassy Hill Kerrville New Folk winning songwriters picked from 32 finalists who performed during the 2008 Grassy Hill Kerrville New Folk Concerts 24 & 25 May.
- She shared the prestigious ASCAP Foundation Sammy Cahn Award for 2009 with Oren Lavie. She joins previous winners John Mayer, Josh Ritter, Lori McKenna, Nicole Atkins, and John Francis.
