= Carrie Elkin =

American singer-songwriter

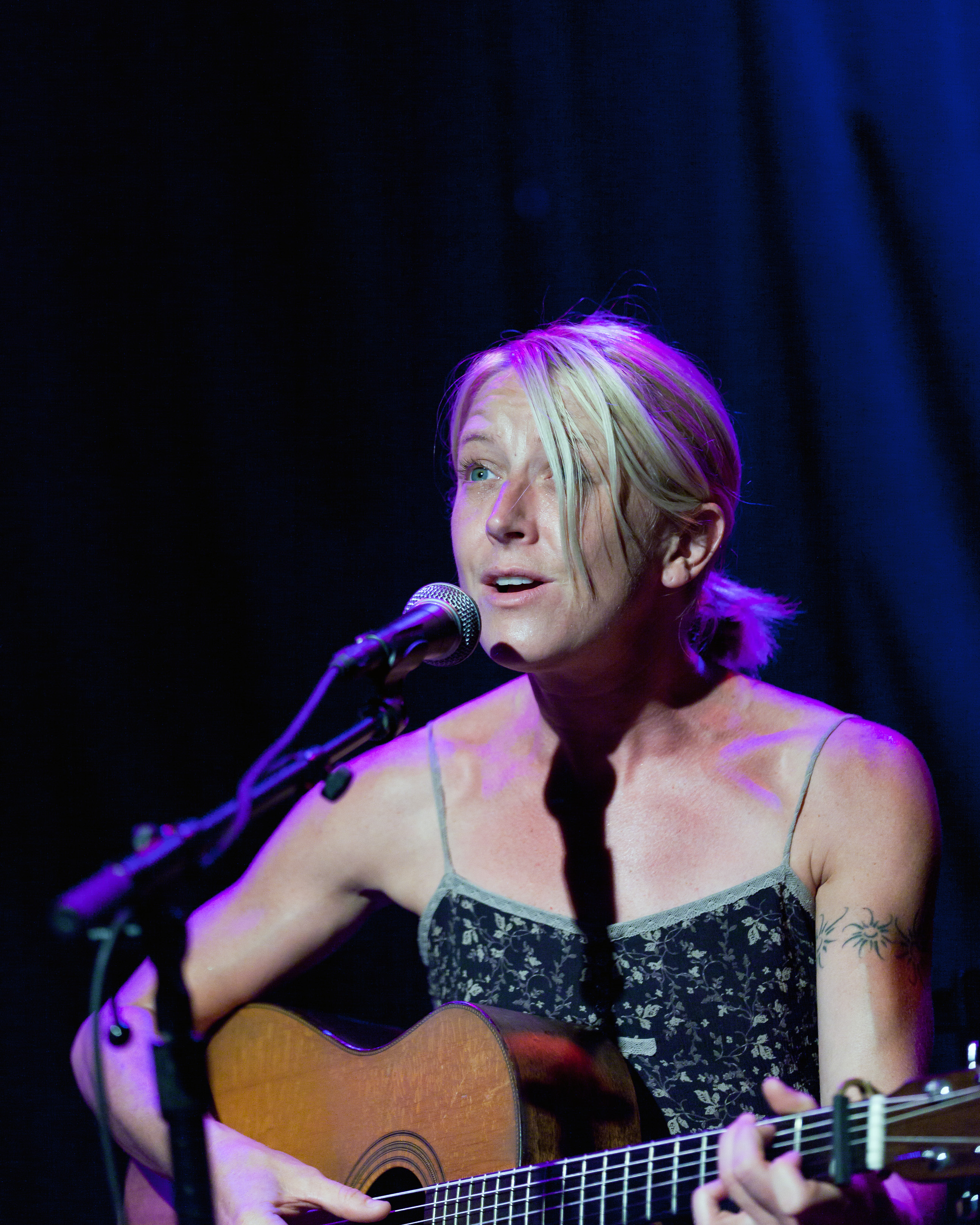
- Elkin at High Noon Saloon, Madison, Wisconsin; August 8, 2010

Background information
- Born: Carrie Lynn Elkin; October 11, 1973 (age 53); Cleveland, Ohio
- Genres: Folk, country
- Occupations: Vocalist, guitarist, musician, singer-songwriter, composer, lap harpist
- Years active: 1995–present
- Label: Red House Records
- Website: CarrieElkin.com

Carrie Elkin (born October 11, 1973 in Cleveland, Ohio), is a folk/country singer and musician based out of Austin, Texas. Active since the mid-1990s, she signed with Red House Records in September 2010.

== Early life ==
Carrie Elkin was born in Cleveland, Ohio on October 11, 1973. She began playing the saxophone and singing at her church at a young age. She later competed as a National Champion acro-gymnast. She studied physiology at Ohio University before working as an organic chemist.

When deciding to concentrate on a music career, she embarked on a nomadic lifestyle which lasted for more than a decade. She performed in a variety of clubs and recorded several self-funded albums – starting with her 1996 debut, Simplicity.

== Career ==
She self-released her first album, Simplicity, in 1996. Her second album, Live at the Front Room, was released in 2001. The Waltz arrived in 2004 and The Jeopardy of Circumstance in 2007. Her fifth record, Call It My Garden was released in early 2011 by Red House Records; her first with that label (she originally released the album in 2010). It was produced by Colin Brooks and Danny Schmidt and features Sam Baker, Raina Rose, Robby Hecht, A. J. Roach, Anthony Da Costa, and Storyhill's John Hermanson. The first track, "Jesse Likes Birds" was No. 1 Song on the FOLKDJ-L radio playlists (a.k.a. "Folk DJ List") for the month of January 2011 – based on 15,346 overall airplays from 157 different radio disc jockeys. It was the No. 2 Song in February 2011. The album ranked fifth for January 2011 for plays of "Jesse Likes Birds", "Iowa", and "Edge Of The World". It ranked No. 5 Album again for February 2011 for plays of "Jesse Likes Birds", "Landeth By Sea", and "Guilty Hands" — based on 12596 overall airplays from 149 different DJs.

The song, "Jesse Likes Birds" from Call It My Garden was called one of the best songs of 2011 (17th of 22) by The Austin Chronicle. She was named one of Texas Music Magazine's 2011 "Artists of the Year" in their Winter 2012 issue. She appeared at the 2007 South Padre International Music Festival on South Padre Island, Texas.

Elkin's first album in six years, The Penny Collector is a follow-up to "twangy, pure country" Call It My Garden (2011). Titled in honor of her father, a lifelong collector of coins, whose "passing informed the narrative woven throughout his daughter's sixth LP."

== Style and sound ==
Maverick magazine describes Elkin as an acoustic guitarist who performs mainly in the folk and country musical genres and is "in love with the act of singing."

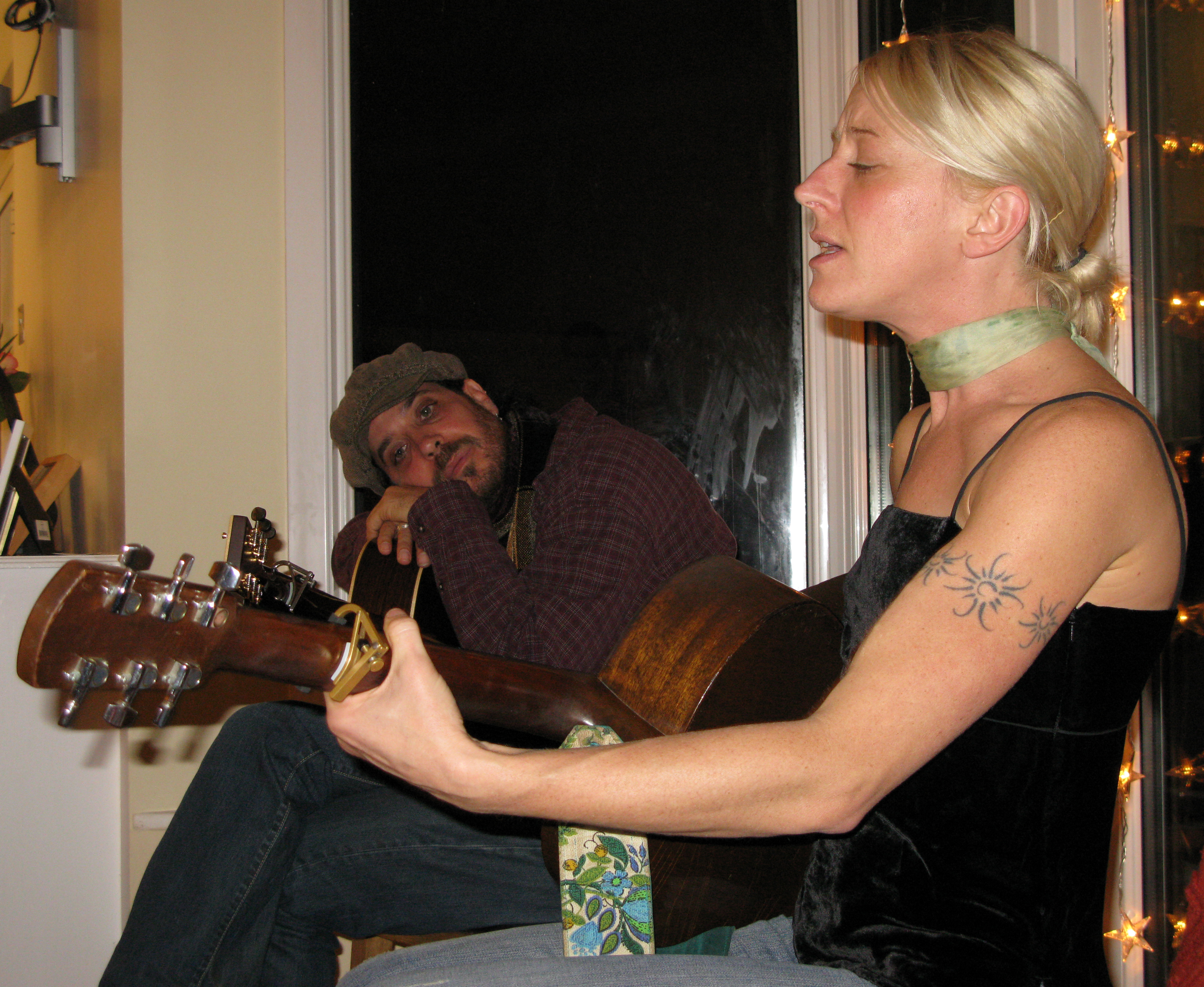
With Danny Schmidt at house party in UK November 30, 2009

== Personal ==
Elkin is married to singer-songwriter Danny Schmidt and gave birth to their first child, Maisie, in 2016. They lived together in Austin. In 2021, they moved to Nashville, Tennessee.

== Discography ==
- Simplicity (1996)
- Live at the Front Room (2001)
- The Waltz (2004) [
- The Jeopardy of Circumstance (2007)
- Call It My Garden (2011) Red House Records
- For Keeps (2014)
- The Penny Collector (2017)
