= Paul Curreri =

American singer-songwriter

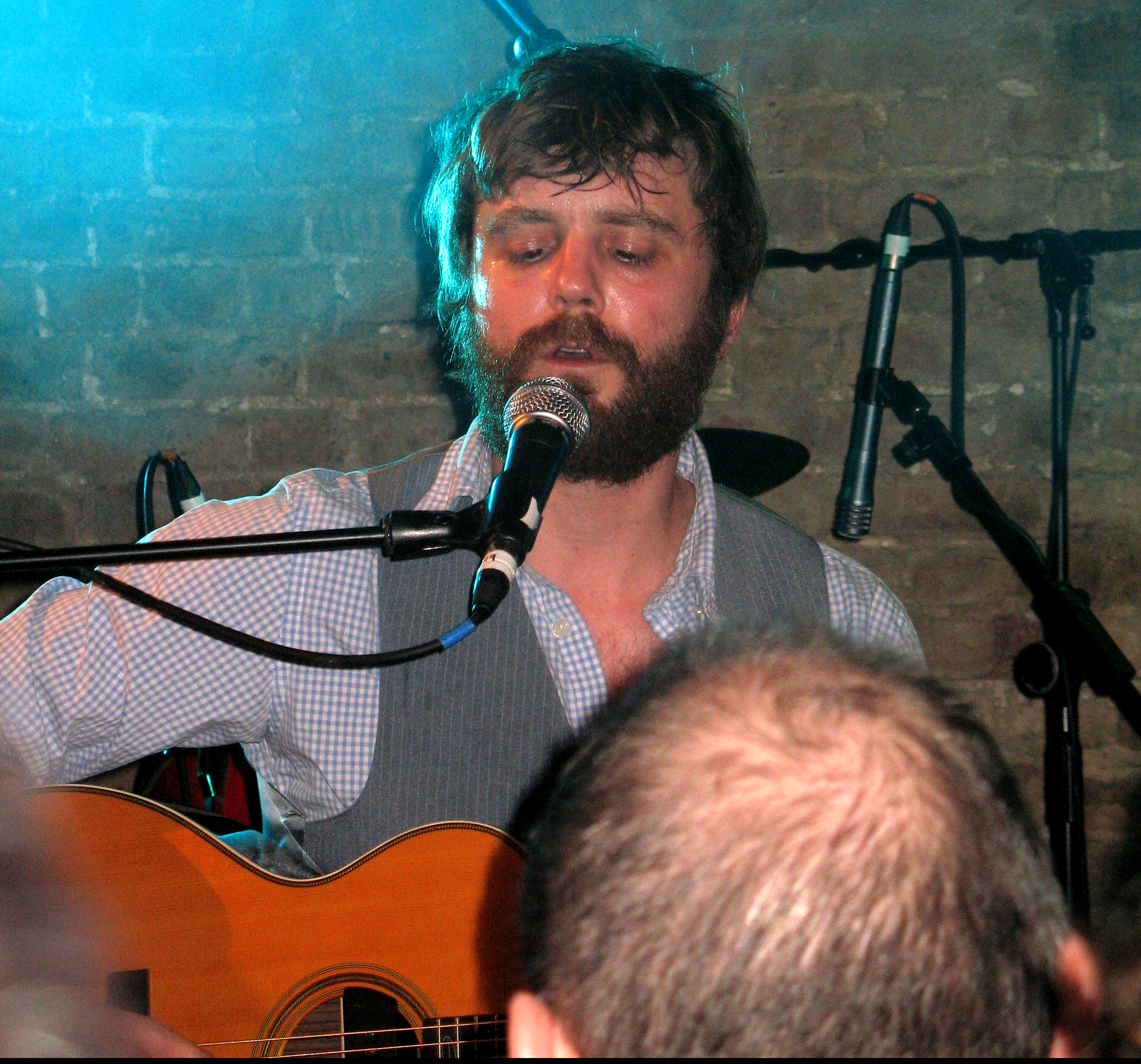
- The Roundhouse, London, March 6, 2008

Background information
- Born: Michael Paul Curreri, Jr. January 28, 1976 (age 50); Seattle, Washington, U.S.
- Genres: Folk, blues, country, rock
- Occupations: Singer, guitarist, musician, producer, instrumentalist
- Instruments: Guitar, piano, keyboard
- Years active: 2000–present
- Labels: City Salvage, Tin Angel Records
- Website: Official Website

Paul Curreri (born January 28, 1976), an American guitarist, pianist, songwriter, and music producer born in Seattle, Washington, and raised in Richmond, Virginia. He performs mainly in the folk and blues music styles. He married songwriter-guitarist Devon Sproule in May 2005 and lived with her in Charlottesville, Virginia. They have appeared and toured together, performing duets – most famously for Valentine's Day. He now produces his wife's tracks, providing supporting instrumentation.

Curreri and Sproule moved to Berlin, Germany in September 2011, have since resided in Austin, Texas, and now live in Charlottesville.

== Music career ==
=== Early years and education ===
Michael Paul Curreri, Jr. was born January 28, 1976, in Seattle, Washington. When he was 13, his family moved to Richmond, Virginia, where he first put bands together and performed as a musician. He was friends with fellow musician Drew Gibson and "from ages 13 to 18" they played "in bands together, writing songs and encouraging each other." In 1995 he enrolled at the Rhode Island School of Design to pursue painting.

He met artist Andy Friedman at RISD, who had dropped out of the Pratt Institute the previous year. Together they used "the umbrella of art school to learn and act out creatively," as Friedman explained. Switching from painting to filmmaking, Curreri then ignored his coursework to write songs. He and his new friend delved into "country blues originators and inventors, from Mississippi John Hurt to John Hartford." Friedman said of his older-brother role in the relationship, "I liked that I pointed him the way of the country blues and drinking," he said. "All the good stuff, you know?" By the time Curreri graduated from RISD he had composed "more than 200 songs" on guitar and piano.

Moving to Williamsburg, Brooklyn after graduation, Curreri and Friedman lived in a "lopsided apartment with mice and layers of peeling linoleum." They worked at mailroom jobs. Curreri would take the Martin guitar his parents had given him to open mic nights, drawing numbers to play. "Maybe you're drunk, maybe not," Curreri later said. "Maybe you're a featured artist. Next thing you know, you're drawing a number again."

Following a spot at New York City's Knitting Factory in 2001, he received several tour invitations from Kelly Joe Phelps. Over the next four years, the two would play over 100 concerts together. After a year in New York City, he moved with a girlfriend to Knoxville, Tennessee. There he "burned through a dozen jobs." Curreri then moved back to Richmond and on to Charlottesville, Virginia.

"I hadn't quite moved yet to Charlottesville and was working a catering gig that night, and some people asked if I wanted to go hear Devon Sproule. They said, 'Have you ever heard her? She's kind of good.' So they dragged me, and I walk in and I thought, 'My goodness, she's kind of cute' ... something propelled me onto that stage, and I think it was more than whiskey."

— Paul Curreri

=== Charlottesville ===
Attending the debut of the King of My Living Room songwriter series in Charlottesville in 2001, Curreri decided to make his home there. The original group of Charlottesville songwriters that launched this series of live shows included such artists as Brady Earnhart, Danny Schmidt, Stratton Salidis, Jan Smith, Lance Brenner, Browning Porter, and Jeff Romano. The concept resulted in a number of concerts, many of which Curreri would join in on – including the reunion/finale in November 2007 at the Gravity Lounge in Charlottesville.

Schmidt, Curreri, and songwriter/guitarist Devon Sproule became housemates – with Paul and Devon marrying in May 2005. Curreri later wrote and recorded a letter in song form to Danny, who responded with "Two Guitars", which he began performing live in 2009. Schmidt recorded his fifth album Little Grey Sheep (2008) in the Curreri/Sproule home, with Curreri serving as production engineer.

Curreri and Devon met while Devon was performing at a show in Charlottesville and Curreri leapt on stage to add vocals to a Johnny Cash song she was singing. In Charlottesville, the now-defunct Gravity Lounge became something of a home venue for both. Curreri gave the first official concert at that venue. Many times over the years he and Sproule performed together there, receiving particular acclaim for their Valentine's Day duets.

Curreri contributed electric guitar on his wife's backup bands. They both tour and perform in the UK extensively, where they have developed a considerable following.

=== Throat injury ===
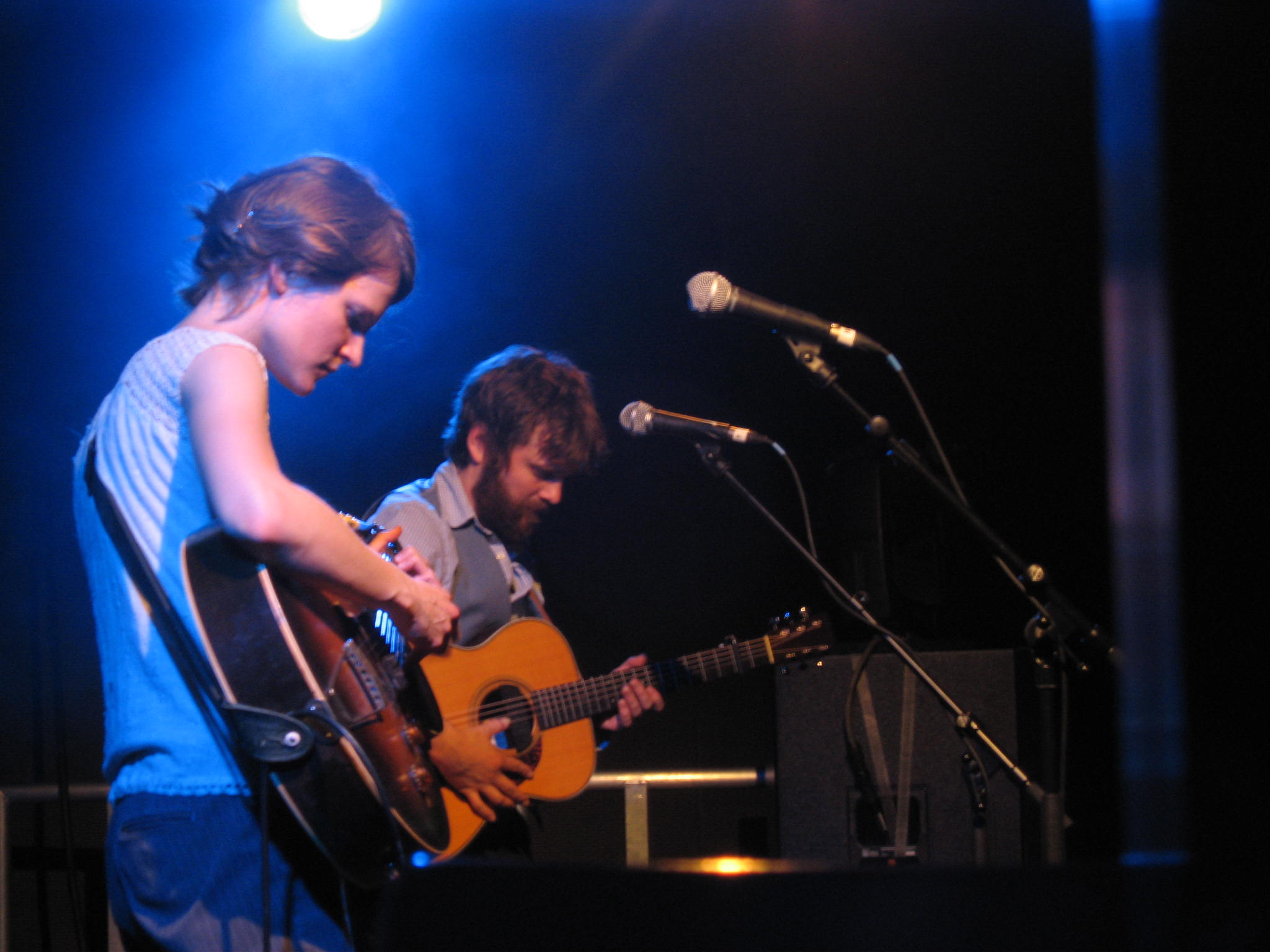
With Devon Sproule The Roundhouse in London March 6, 2008

In July 2008, Curreri suffered a throat injury, which caused him to cancel the majority of his remaining concerts for the year. He explains: "Basically I quit smoking, and it turns out that you can damage your vocal cords right after that pretty easily because they expand in their newfound health."

In the interim, he produced approximately ten records, including the debut album for the English trio Don't Move!, a soundtrack for a Discovery Channel documentary on young farmers called Greenhorns, and his wife, Devon Sproule's third official album, Don't Hurry For Heaven. Additionally, he slowly assembled his sixth album, California, which was released 2009 in the UK, and 2010 in the US. He also arranged and performed an instrumental version of "We Three Kings" for Our Christmas Present (2008) to support Our Community Place programs in Harrisonburg, Virginia.

He could often be seen riding his vintage 1976 Honda CB750 motorcycle through the Virginia countryside, a bike which he said played an "enormous role" in his life during the injury; however, when he returned to playing music regularly in 2010, he sold the bike citing fears that it was only a matter of time before he crashed.

Curreri called the injury "a gift," saying, "I'm looking to expand my perspective. I'm looking to find what I didn't have time to find before. I'm looking to appreciate."

In 2009 Curreri traveled to Kenya to collaborate with benga musician Joseph Kamaru and Ochieng' Nelly. He also did a few tours in Europe as Sproule's guitar player. He returned to touring in 2010 and performed with his wife at the award ceremony for the ASCAP Foundation Sammy Cahn Award for songwriting she received in June 2010 (video).

=== Move to Berlin ===
In September 2011 Curreri and Sproule moved to Berlin, Germany after years of traveling to Europe to perform. "There have been a fair numbers of years where our careers have just primarily existed overseas," says Curreri. "The territories are so much smaller," he says, "and the access to national media is much easier. Because the territories are smaller, it's easier word-of-mouth-wise." He also released his eighth album, The Big Shitty, which was recorded in Berlin at Tricone Studios in January 2011. His regular English rhythm section – Euan Rodger on drums, and Joe Carvell on bass – provided the backing, with Curreri filling in the remaining instruments. Sproule also played clarinet on one track.

=== Recordings ===
Two early demos, referred to simply as "the red one" and "the blue one," contained early versions of well-known songs like "Bees" and "Senseless as a Cuckoo" (as well as unreleased ballads). Independent Brooklyn-based label City Salvage Records released Curreri's first album, From Long Gones to Hawkmoth in April 2002. In June 2003, City Salvage released his second album, Songs for Devon Sproule dedicated to his future wife. Recorded by Kelly Joe Phelps, in the same studio he had recorded his own Roll Away the Stone and Shine Eyed Mister Zen albums, over the space of just two evenings, Songs for Devon Sproule captured Curreri at his simplest, and proved to be his most popular record to date. The album found Curreri accompanying himself on acoustic guitar, creating a sound similar to his concert performances. Phelps played guitar on "Beneath a Crozet Trestle Bridge." The resulting effort was an album of primarily original material influenced by country blues and folk music.

The Spirit of the Staircase, Curreri's 2004 release saw the return of Jeff Romano, who produced and performed on 2002's From Long Gones to Hawkmoth. The title of the record comes from a French expression l'esprit d'escalier, the things you think to say after you are already out the door. His first live album, Are You Going to Paul Curreri was recorded at Charlottesville's (now-defunct) Gravity Lounge, and released in 2006. Musical backing was provided by Charlottesvillians Randall Pharr (bass) and Spencer Lathrop (drums).

Curreri's fifth album, The Velvet Rut, was released in the UK on Tin Angel Records in June 2007. It was released in the U.S. in October 2007, on City Salvage. Uncut Magazine gave it four stars, while Mojo gave it five stars. His sixth album, California, was released in November 2009 by Tin Angel Records in the United Kingdom, and in April 2010 through Hi-Ya in the United States. The "Hometown Release Concert" for the album was held August 7, 2010, at the Jefferson Theater in Charlottesville, Virginia. Sam Wilson performed on guitar, Jonathan Mills on bass, and Todd Wellons on drums, with Nathan Moore opening.

== Reception ==
Curreri performs mainly in the folk and blues music styles. Known best for his solo acoustic performances, he also contributes electric guitar stylings to his wife's band, and has fielded his own band at times. He often plays all accompanying instruments himself on his recordings. Since the release in 2002 of his debut CD, Long Gones to Hawkmoth, as the Washington Post states: "he's been collecting critical praise ever since for his bluesy Americana tunes and wild-eyed tales." Other media reflections on his style and sound include . .

Curreri is such a fluent fingerpicker that he's free of all convention or blues device, grooving and improvising all over the place. There's just a boatload of spirit and old time verve on every tune.

. . Curreri reminds me of guitar master, Rene Lawrence, with a crazy intricate, crashing, dancing fingerpicking that simply makes sense in context with his themes . . The Velvet Rut comes on edgy and dirty, moves into rootsy, bluesy places, feels a little Appalachian at times, and maybe a bit like folk, but it doesn't make a commitment to any of them . . Acoustic, electric, electronica, distorted, fragile, in your face all thrown into the mix for a delightful listen.

— Christy Claxton, Stave magazine

Gentle in thought, perceptive in lyric and melodic in finely tuned fretwork . . Curreri's finger-picking style is lilting and fluid, and there's a languid tension throughout that's created by a strong and sure dynamic sense. The flicking and scampering of his fingers weave an aural magic that complements his elusive and playful vocal style perfectly.

He and his wife perform live duets regularly, especially for Valentine's Day. In addition to the music, he is an original humorist known for telling engaging comic stories between songs.

== Personal ==
Paul Curreri married singer-songwriter Devon Sproule in May 2005 and they live together in Charlottesville, Virginia. Their daughter Ray Lee Curreri was born in August 2016. Curreri's father is a Naval Academy graduate and attorney. His brother Matt Curreri is a musician.

=== Health ===
Curreri sobered up in 2013. He's been "sidelined" as a performing musician since about 2015 with "hand and vocal problems." Curreri has been seen by "numerous" otolaryngologists without a successful diagnosis of the "root cause" of his voice issue.

== Discography ==
- From Long Gones to Hawkmoth (2002) City Salvage
- Songs for Devon Sproule (2003) Tin Angel
- The Spirit of the Staircase (2004) City Salvage
- Are You Going to Paul Curreri (2006) City Salvage
- The Velvet Rut (2007) Tin Angel/City Salvage
- Valentine's Duets with Devon Sproule (2007)
- California (2009) Tin Angel/Hi-Ya
- The Big Shitty (2012) Tin Angel

=== Compilations ===
- King of My Living Room (2003)
- Our Christmas Present (2008)
