= Gibson ES-125 =

Guitar model

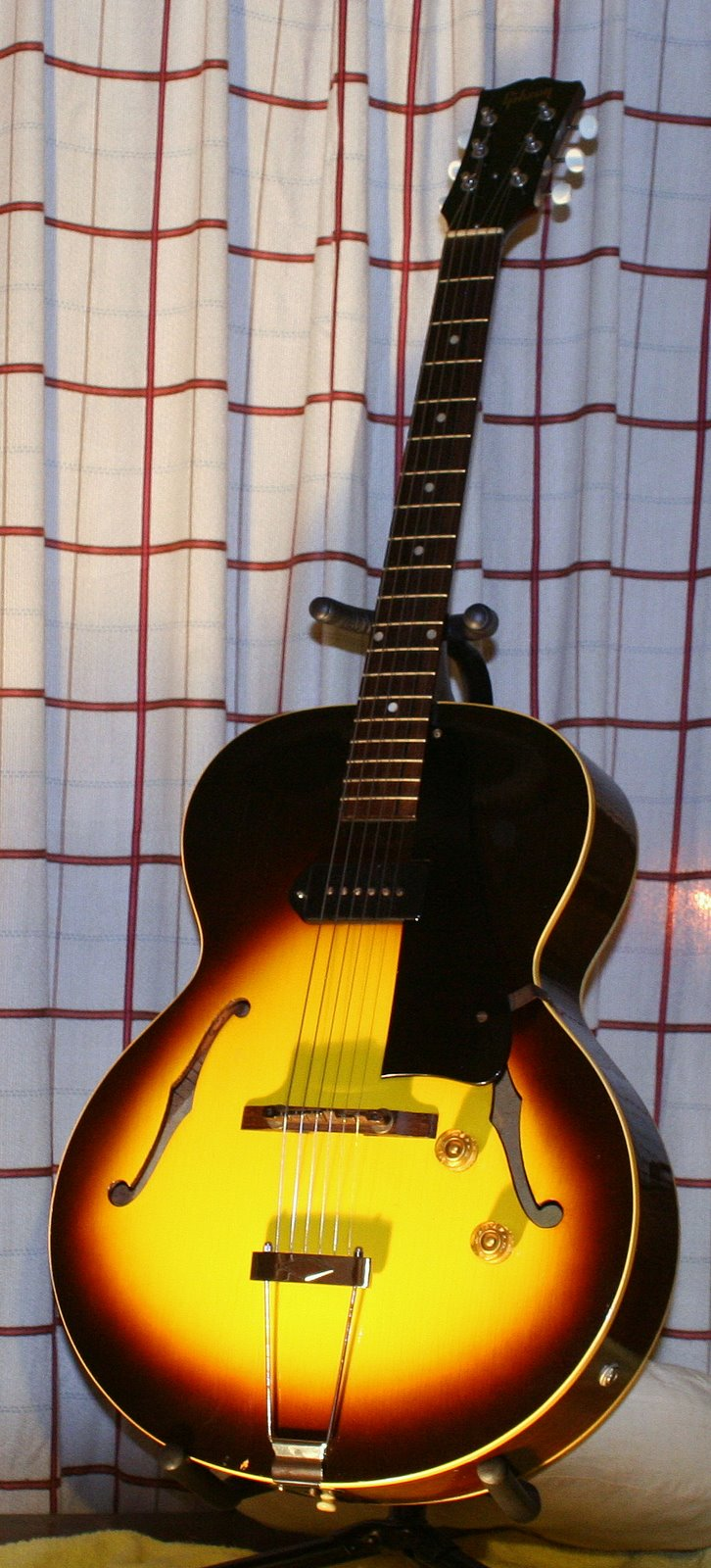
- A 1955 Gibson ES-125 with a P-90
- Manufacturer: Gibson
- Period: 1941-1970

Construction
- Body type: Hollow
- Neck joint: set neck

Woods
- Body: laminated 3 plies ( maple, poplar, maple )
- Neck: mahogany
- Fretboard: rosewood

Hardware
- Bridge: mahogany
- Pickup: 1 P-90

Colors available
- Sunburst

The Gibson ES-125 is an archtop, hollow body electric guitar model that was produced by the Gibson Guitar Corporation.

== Model history ==
Introduced in 1941 as the successor to the ES-100, the ES-125 was an entry-level archtop electric guitar. It had one P-90 single-coil pickup in the neck position, a single volume control and a single tone control. The pre-war model, discontinued in 1942, had a smaller 14.5" body. When reintroduced in 1946, it had the larger, 16.25" wide body that the ES-150 had. The unbound rosewood fingerboard initially sported pearl trapezoid inlays; later, it would have dot inlays.

In the mid-1950s, the ES-125T was introduced, which was an entry-level thinline archtop electric guitar based on the original ES-125. It would later add options for double P-90 pickups and a sharp cutaway, referred to as a florentine cutaway, similar to the ES-175. Both the thinline and the regular models would be discontinued by the 1970s.

== Specifications ==
=== 1946 ===
- 16 1/4" wide
- Approximately 3.5" thick body
- Scale length 24 3/4
- One non-adjustable P-90 pickup with "dog ears"
- Pickup in neck position
- Tortoise grain pickguard
- Trapeze tailpiece
- Single bound top and back
- Pearloid circular fingerboard inlays
- Silkscreen logo
- Sunburst finish

=== 1948 ===
- Dot fingerboard inlays

=== 1950 ===
- Plain tailpiece
- P-90 pickup with adjustable poles

== Pickups and Components ==
The ES-125 was equipped with one P90 pickup. The original had 6 Alnico slug pole pieces. In 1950 the P90 transitioned to 6 adjustable poles between two Alnico 5 bar magnets.

The model used for the ES-125 has a string spacing on the neck pickup of 1 15/16" from high E to low E. The ES-125 also used a tapered dogear cover for their neck position pickups with a thickness of 4/16" on the treble side and 5/16" on the bass side. Since the fingerboard sits flush to the body (as opposed to an ES-175) the ES-125 requires a shorter neck pickup than a typical dogear. This pickup is, however, not as short as those found on an ES-330TD which has the pickup mounted flush to the end of the fingerboard.

Coils were wound to approximately 10,000 wraps although DC resistance of these pickups can vary greatly

Volume and tone controls were 500k Audio taper pots. A treble bypass cap value of .022 microfarads was used for the tone circuit. D (Double Pickup) models included a 3 position toggle switch to select each pickup individually or both pickups simultaneously.

== Models ==
- ES-125 Full depth, non-cutaway archtop with single P-90 pickup; produced from 1946 to 1970
- ES-125D Full depth, non-cutaway body with double p90 pickups (very rare; only a small number produced in 1957)
- ES-125C Full depth body with florentine cutaway; produced from 1965 to 1971
- ES-125CD Full depth body, double pickup (P-90) with florentine cutaway; produced from 1965 to 1971
- ES-125T (T = Thinline body) non-cutaway; produced from 1956 to 1969
- ES-125TD (D = Double p90 pickups) non-cutaway; produced from 1957 to 1964
- ES-125TC (C = Cutaway) florentine cutaway; produced from 1960 to 1970
- ES-125TCD (D = Double p90 pickups) florentine cutaway; produced from 1960 to 1970

== Notable players ==
- Tracy Chapman
- Bill Frisell
- B. B. King (early '50s)
- Jeff Mangum
- Jim O'Rourke
- Marc Ribot
- Daniel Rossen
- George Thorogood
- Jeremy Spencer
- Richard Clark
- Martijn van Iterson
- Thom Yorke
- Amber Rubarth
- Joe Buck
- Duke Garwood
- Joe Pass
- Jimmie Vaughan
- Stevie Ray Vaughan
- Otomo Yoshihide
- Lenny Breau
- D. Boon
- Fenton Robinson
- Devon Sproule
