= The Behavior of Organisms =

1938 book by Burrhus Skinner

- First edition
- Author: B.F. Skinner
- Language: English
- Subject: Behavior analysis, Behaviorology
- Publisher: Appleton-Century
- Publication date: 1938
- Publication place: United States
- Pages: 457

The Behavior of Organisms is B.F. Skinner's first book and was published in May 1938 as a volume of the Century Psychology Series. It set out the parameters for the discipline that would come to be called the experimental analysis of behavior (EAB) and Behavior Analysis.

Skinner looks at science behavior and how the analysis of behavior produces data which can be studied, rather than acquiring data through a conceptual or neural process. In the book, behavior is classified either as respondent or operant behavior, where respondent behavior is caused by an observable stimulus and operant behavior is where there is no observable stimulus for a behavior. The behavior is studied in depth with rats and the feeding responses they exhibit.

This book was reviewed in 1939 by Ernest R. Hilgard.
