= Dandelion Community =

Rural intentional community in Canada

Coordinates: 44.4618°N 76.8782°W

Dandelion was a rural intentional community near Enterprise, Ontario, active in the 1970s, and disbanded around 1990. It was a member of the Federation of Egalitarian Communities, meeting all requirements for full membership.
