= 1918 New Year Honours (MC) =

This is a list of Military Crosses awarded in the 1918 New Year Honours.

The 1918 New Year Honours were appointments by King George V to various orders and honours to reward and highlight good works by citizens of the British Empire. The appointments were published in The London Gazette and The Times in January, February and March 1918.

Unlike the 1917 New Year Honours, the 1918 honours was dominated by rewards for war efforts. As The Times reported: "The New Year Honours represent largely the circumstances of war, and, perhaps, as usual, they also reflect human nature in an obvious form. The list is one of the rare opportunities for the public to scan the names of soldiers who have distinguished themselves in service."

The recipients of honours are displayed here as they were styled before their new honour.

== Military Cross ==
- Tmp 2nd Lt. Edgar Victor William Ablett, Army Cyclist Corps
- Tmp Lt. Walter Murray Ablewhite, King's Royal Rifle Corps
- Tmp Lt. Eric Pearson Adair, Royal Engineers
- Lt. George Alexander Findlay Adam, Yeomanry
- Capt. Robert Adam, Gordon Highlanders
- Tmp Capt. Reginald Addenbrooke-Prout, General List, and Royal Field Arty.
- Capt. Harry Adshead, Worcestershire Reg.
- Lt. Philip Henry Adshead, Gordon Highlanders
- C.S. Maj. George Alexander Aiers, Grenadier Guards
- 2nd Lt. Ralph Bower Ainsworth, Durham Light Inf.
- Tmp Capt. Flockart Aitken, Royal Field Arty.
- 2nd Lt. Jack Phillips Akerman, Somerset Light Inf.
- 2nd Lt. Denis William Aldridge, Royal Engineers
- Capt. Charles Adam Murray Alexander Royal Inniskilling Fusiliers
- Lt. Charles William Allen, Royal Arty.
- Capt. Clarence George Allen, Army Service Corps
- 2nd Lt. Daniel Frank Allen, Royal Field Arty.
- Lt. Edward Allen, Royal Garrison Arty.
- Battery Sergeant Major Edward Allen, Royal Garrison Arty.
- Tmp Capt. Ernest Mortimer Allen, Hampshire Reg.
- Tmp Capt. George William Graham Allen, Tank Corps
- Lt. Charles Walter Allfrey, Royal Horse Arty.
- C.S. Maj. Frank Allsopp, North Lancashire Reg.
- Tmp Lt. Herbert Alnwick, West Yorkshire Reg.
- Tmp Lt. Ernest Haik Riddall Altounyan RAMC
- Tmp Capt. John Goldwell Ambrose, Royal Engineers
- Capt. William Gerald Ambrose Cheshire Reg., and Nigeria Reg.
- Capt. Francis Sainthill Anderson, Royal Horse Arty.
- Lt. George Frederick Anderson, King's Royal Rifle Corps
- Q.M. and Hon. Lt. James Elphinstone Bocquet Anderson, Liverpool Reg.
- Capt. John George Anderson, RAMC
- Capt. Aubrey Claude Anderton, Royal Engineers
- Q.M. and Hon. Lt. James Edward Hill Anderton, RAMC
- Capt. James Collingwood Andrews, London Reg.
- Capt. Herbert William Andrews, Leinster Reg.
- Tmp Lt. Robert Stuart Andrews, Argyll and Sutherland Highlanders
- Capt. Arthur Stanley Angwin, Royal Engineers
- Capt. John Archibald Angus, York & Lancaster Reg.
- Capt. George Henry Anon, Yeomanry
- Capt. Philip Humphrey Antrobus, Irish Guards
- Capt. Robert Weniyss Muir Arbuthnot, Royal Field Arty.
- 2nd Lt. David Archibald, Royal Highlanders
- Tmp Capt. Robert Richmond Archibald RAMC
- Tmp Capt. John Thompson Argent, Royal Engineers
- Tmp Capt. Charles William Arnett, Army Ordnance Depot
- 2nd Lt. Charles Francis Arrowsmith, Liverpool Reg.
- Capt. Harold Garten Ash, London Reg.
- Tmp Lt. William James Asher, Nottinghamshire and Derbyshire Reg.
- Capt. Peter Ashton, Herefordshire Reg.
- 2nd Lt. George Ashwell, Tank Corps
- 2nd Lt. Kenneth Ingham Aspinall, Norfolk Reg.
- 2nd Lt. Vivien Lindsey Aspland, Royal Engineers
- Tmp 2nd Lt. Archibald Matthew Neal Aston, Royal Garrison Arty.
- Lt. Fred Atkinson, Liverpool Reg.
- 2nd Lt. John Corbett Atkinson, Royal Engineers
- Tmp 2nd Lt. Albert Henry Austin, Royal Warwickshire Reg.
- Capt. Thomas Aveling, Royal Garrison Arty.
- Lt. Edmund Portman Awdry, Yeomanry
- 2nd Lt. Percy Ronald Ayers, Welsh Reg.
- 2nd Lt. Evelyn Frederick Bacon, Royal Engineers
- Tmp Capt. Lionel Ashley Baddeley, Army Service Corps
- 2nd Lt. George Norman Bagley, Royal Field Arty.
- 2nd Lt. Charles Edward Kerwia Bagot, Connaught Rangers
- Capt. William Browne Bagshaw, Manchester Reg.
- C.S. Maj. Arthur Bailey, Gloucestershire Reg.
- Tmp Capt. Charles Bailey, Royal Dublin Fusiliers
- 2nd Lt. John Wallis Bailey, Royal Engineers
- Lt. Andrew Ramsay Bain, Argyll and Sutherland Highlanders
- Tmp Lt. Lewis Bam, Royal West Surrey Reg.
- Tmp Capt. Anthony Hugh Bambridge, North Staffordshire Reg.
- Lt. Arthur Septimus Baines, Royal Engineers
- Tmp Capt. George Philip Baines, Durham Light Inf.
- Capt. John Hardcastle Baines, Royal Field Arty.
- Capt. Cecil Avery Baker, South Wales Borderers
- Tmp Capt. Geoffrey Lewis Vashon Baker, Army Service Corps
- Tmp Lt. Charles Percy Lionel Balcombe, Royal Engineers
- Capt. Edward William Sturgis Balfour DSO Dragoon Guards
- 2nd Lt. Arthur Hugh Ball, Royal Garrison Arty.
- 2nd Lt. George Henry Ball, Royal Garrison Arty., Spec. Reserve
- Q.M. and Temp Honorary Lt. John Thomas Ball, Manchester Reg.
- Rev. Robert Wilfred Balleine, Royal Army Chaplains' Dept.
- Lt. Hugh Gordon Bambridge, Royal Engineers
- Tmp Capt. Harold Bancroft, Royal Field Arty.
- 2nd Lt. Edgar Lance Banfield, Royal Irish Fusiliers
- Tmp Capt. John Wilson Bansall, Royal Engineers
- Tmp Lt. Francis James Neville Barber, Royal Field Arty.
- Tmp Sub-Lt. Leonard William Barber, Royal Naval Volunteer Reserve, attd. Machine Gun Company
- Capt. John Hamilton Barbor, Army Service Corps
- 2nd Lt. William John Barclay, London Reg.
- Tmp Capt. William Keith Barclay, Royal Lancaster Reg.
- Tmp Lt. Edward Arthur Baring-Gould, Intelligence Corps
- Tmp 2nd Lt. Arthur Herbert Barltrop, West Yorkshire Reg.
- Lt. Henry Kentish Barnes Royal Horse Arty.
- Tmp Lt. Percy Barnfather, Middlesex Reg.
- Capt. Donald Gordon Barnsley, Gloucestershire Reg.
- Lt. John Barnwell, Leinster Reg., attd. Machine Gun Corps
- Lt. John Ashworth Barraclough, Royal Lancaster Reg., attd. Machine Gun Corps
- 2nd Lt. James Barratt, Manchester Reg.
- Tmp Lt. Ernest Gibbons Barrell, attd. Oxfordshire & Buckinghamshire Light Inf. and Machine Gun Corps
- Q.M. and Hon. Lt. Walter Richard Michael Barrett, Royal Wiltshire Yeomanry
- Capt. Albert Henry Darley Barren, Inf.
- Act. Lt. Harold Eustace Barrow, Liverpool Reg.
- Lt. John Nelson Barstow, Royal Field Arty.
- Tmp Capt. Bertram Friend Bartlett, RAMC
- Tmp 2nd Lt. Clarence Townley Barton, Royal Field Arty.
- Tmp Lt. Martin Batchelor, King's African Rifles
- Lt. Alfred Bates, East Lancashire Reg.
- Tmp Lt. Fred Luntley Battershill, Royal Irish Rifles
- Lt. Ernest Edward Battle, York & Lancaster Reg.
- Tmp Lt. Percy Bayley, Army Service Corps
- 2nd Lt. Percy Bayliss, Royal Scots
- Tmp 2nd Lt. Arthur Gerald Baynham, Tank Corps
- Tmp Capt. Eric Beadon, Army Service Corps
- Tmp Capt. Alan Beal, Royal Field Arty.
- Tmp Capt. John Richmer Beall, South Lancashire Reg.
- Lt. Charles William Beart, Durham Light Inf.
- Capt. Charles Elles Stuart Beatson, Royal Field Arty.
- Capt. Robert Harvey Beaufoy, London Reg.
- Lt. Gerald Beaumont, Yorkshire Light Inf.
- Tmp Lt. John Somerville Beaumont, General List
- Tmp Lt. Maurice James Beavis, Royal Arty.
- Capt. James Geoffrey Brydon Beazley, Liverpool Reg.
- Lt. Edward Overington Becher, Royal Field Arty.
- 2nd Lt. Thomas Beck, Highland Light Inf.
- Tmp Capt. Geoffrey Reid Arnett Beckett, Gloucestershire Reg.
- Lt. Clive Walter Beckingham, Royal Field Arty.
- C.S. Maj. Robert Frederick Beckley, King's Royal Rifle Corps
- Lt. James Robert Bedwell, Royal Garrison Arty. and Royal Flying Corps
- 2nd Lt. Reginald Francis Beech, Northamptonshire Reg. and Gold Coast Reg.
- Capt. Ronald Philipps Glynn Begbie, Royal Garrison Arty.
- Capt. Anthony Harley Mark Bell, Hussars
- Lt. Douglas Ward Bell, Worcestershire Reg., attd. Machine Gun Corps
- Capt. Henry James Bell, Yeomanry
- 2nd Lt. Leonard Charles Bell, Royal Highlanders
- Tmp 2nd Lt. Brian Maude Bellasis, Gloucestershire Reg.
- Lt. Gilbert Charles Beloe, Gloucestershire Reg.
- Tmp Capt. Edward Benoe-Trower, South Wales Borderers
- Tmp Lt. Ernest Wallace Benson, Bedfordshire Reg.
- Lt. Francis Riou Benson, Yeomanry
- Tmp 2nd Lt. Norman de Mattes Bentwich, Special List
- Tmp 2nd Lt. John Bennett, Royal Flying Corps
- Capt. George de la Poer Beresford, Cav., Indian Army
- Rev. Harry Percy Berkeley, Royal Army Chaplains' Dept.
- Tmp Capt. Esmé Beranger Beauchamp Berrange, Royal West Surrey Reg.
- Lt. Jesse Dell Berndge, Royal Engineers
- Tmp Sub-Lt. John Hulme Bessell, Royal Naval Volunteer Reserve
- Rev. John Kenneth Best, Royal Army Chaplains' Dept.
- Tmp Lt. Diavid Jardine Bethell, Scots Guards
- Battery Sergeant Major Edward Harold Bette, Royal Garrison Arty.
- Tmp Capt. John Valentine Betts, Royal Engineers
- Tmp Lt. Alexander Braithwaite Bevan Bevan, Royal Engineers
- Capt. Henry Vincent Bevington, London Reg.
- Capt. Benjamin John Bewley, Royal Garrison Arty.
- Tmp 2nd Lt. Theophilus Beynon, General List
- B.Q.M. Sgt. Henry Bibby, Lancashire Fusiliers
- Rev. Kenneth Julian Faithfull Bickersteth, Royal Army Chaplains' Dept.
- Lt. Arthur Bicknell, Gloucestershire Reg.
- Tmp 2nd Lt. Charles Leslie Pinckard Biggar, Hampshire Reg.
- Tmp Lt. Edward Hugh Bandloss, Headquarters, Royal Field Arty.
- Capt. Percy Carr Bird, Gordon Highlanders, attd. Machine Gun Corps
- Tmp Capt. Oswald Hornby Joseph Birley, Intelligence Corps
- Tmp Lt. Granville Baylis Powell Birtles, Royal Engineers
- Capt. Thomas Edward Bisdee, Duke of Cornwall's Light Inf.
- Tmp 2nd Lt. Alfred Harold Bishop, Royal Engineers
- Lt. Frank Cyril Bishop, London Reg.
- 2nd Lt. Eric Bisset, Northumberland Fusiliers
- Tmp Lt. Leonard Frederick Bittles, Essex Reg.
- Lt. John Robert Black, Seaforth Highlanders
- Capt. Norman Valentine Blacker, East Yorkshire Reg., attd. Machine Gun Corps
- Tmp Sub-Lt. Leonard Anderson Blackball, Royal Naval Volunteer Reserve
- Capt. Hans Frederick Blackwood, Yorkshire Reg., attd. Machine Gun Corps
- Lt. Charles Edwin Norman Blake, Royal Field Arty.
- Hon. Lt. William Atherstone Blake, Intelligence Dept.
- Tmp Capt. John Edward Blakemore, Royal Field Arty.
- Tmp Lt. George Frederick Blakesley, Special List
- Capt. Owen Geoffrey Blayney, Northumberland Fusiliers
- Tmp Capt. Maurice Frederick Bliss, RAMC
- R.S. Maj. Josiah Bloomfield, Royal Sussex Reg.
- Tmp Lt. Roland Charles Biolmbroke, Suffolk Reg.
- Tmp Capt. Richard Bolton, West Riding Reg.
- Lt. James Ferguson Bomford, Worcestershire Reg.
- Rev. Basil Kendall Bond, Royal Army Chaplains' Dept.
- Lt. Thomas Booth, Connaught Rangers
- Tmp 2nd Lt. Edward Fullerton Borrie, Royal Engineers
- Q.M. and Hon. Capt. Francis Sydney Boshell, Royal Berkshire Reg.
- Tmp Capt. Philip Rutherford Boswell, RAMC
- 2nd Lt. George Gerald Randall Bott, South Lancashire Reg.
- Rev. Aloysius M. Bouchier, Royal Army Chaplains' Dept.
- Tmp Lt. Donald Boumphrey, Machine Gun Corps
- Lt. James Bourke, Leinster Reg., attd. Machine Gun Corps
- Tmp Capt. Robert Leonard Sowen, King's Royal Rifle Corps
- Tmp Lt. Francis William Bowman, Nyasaland Field Force
- Lt. Gerald Wilberforce Bowman, Royal Field Arty.
- Tmp Lt. William Everett Bowmass, Royal Field Arty.
- Tmp 2nd Lt. Alfred Boacall, Royal Engineers
- Lt. Percy Boxall, Army Service Corps
- Capt. John Francis Croft Boyes, Royal Field Arty.
- Tmp Lt. Ernest Franklin Bozman, Royal West Kent Reg.
- Lt. Philip Holmes Bradbury, Welsh Reg.
- Lt. Albert Bradley, Cheshire Reg.
- Tmp 2nd Lt. William James Bradley, Gloucestershire Reg.
- Lt. William Lawrence Bragg, Royal Horse Arty.
- Lt. George Btraime, North Staffordshire Reg.
- R.S. Maj. William George Brain, Gloucestershire Reg.
- Capt. Champion Andrew Branfill, Yeomanry
- Lt. William Russell Brazier, Royal Garrison Arty.
- Capt. Charles Gordon Brentnall RAMC
- Tmp 2nd Lt. Douglas Lancelot Brereton, Royal Engineers
- Tmp 2nd Lt. Reginald de Renzie Brett, General List and Royal Flying Corps
- 2nd Lt. Oswald George Breul, Royal Engineers
- Tmp Lt. Cecil Baron Briggs, Royal Engineers
- 2nd Lt. Herbert George William Brinsley, Royal Garrison Arty.
- Lt. Harry Brissenden, Royal Garrison Arty.
- Lt. John Jeffries Britten, Royal Field Arty.
- Tmp Lt. Arthur Frederick Britton, General List and Royal Flying Corps
- Lt. Arthur Vernon Broadbent, West Riding Reg.
- Capt. Edgar Richard Broadbent, Hussars
- Capt. Edric William Broadberry, Essex Reg., and Royal Flying Corps
- Lt. Arthur Gordon Brock, East Kent Reg.
- C.S. Maj. Edward Clarence Brock Essex Reg.
- 2nd Lt. Cyril Elcomb Brockhurst, Yorkshire Reg.
- Capt. Patrick Tait Brodie, General List, King's African Rifles
- Lt. Godfrey Leveson Brooke-Hunt, Indian Army Reserve of Ofc.s
- 2nd Lt. William James Brooks, Royal Field Arty.
- Tmp 2nd Lt. Andrew Terras Brown, West Yorkshire Reg.
- Lt. Francis War burton Brown, Seaforth Highlanders
- Lt. Frank Cooper William Brown, Leinster Reg.
- Lt. John Brown, Royal Flying Corps
- Lt. Niman Stewart Brown, Royal Field Arty.
- Tmp Capt. Orlando Moray Brown, Royal Engineers
- Tmp Lt. Robert Harold Brown, North Staffordshire Reg.
- Tmp Capt. Stewart Charles Brown, Royal Field Arty.
- Lt. Walter James Brown, South Lancashire Reg.
- Tmp Capt. William Ernest Enron, South Wales Borderers
- Tmp Lt. William Neilson Brown, Gordon Highlanders
- Tmp Capt. William Rae Brown, Royal Field Arty.
- Lt. Cyril Edward Browne, Army Service Corps
- Tmp Lt. Harold Edward Browne, Royal Engineers
- Tmp Lt. Percival Hugh Browne, Army Cyclist Corps
- Lt. Walter Robinson Brownell, Liverpool Reg.
- 2nd Lt. Frank Edwin Browning, Gloucestershire Reg.
- Tmp 2nd Lt. John Selwyn Browning, West Riding Reg.
- Lt. Nevil Charles Dowell Brownjohn, Royal Engineers
- Lt. Alexander Livingstone Bruce, Reserve of Ofc.s
- Lt. George Burnley Bruce, West Riding Reg.
- Lt. Dominick Nicholas Brunioardi, Royal Welsh Fusiliers
- Tmp Capt. Arthur Gilbert Bryant, Army Service Corps
- 2nd Lt. Frederick George Bryant, Royal Engineers
- Lt. Herbert Disbrow Brydone-Jack, Royal Field Arty.
- Capt. George Brymer, Royal Garrison Arty.
- Capt. Thomas Ogilvy Malcolm Buchan, Royal West Surrey Reg.
- Tmp Lt. Walter Buchanan-Smith, Nigeria Reg.
- Tmp Capt. Sydney Thacker Buck, Royal Sussex Reg.
- Capt. Charles Dudley Maybury Buckley, RAMC
- Tmp Capt. James Christopher Bull, West Riding Reg.
- Tmp Lt. Stanley Crossland Bullock, Royal Engineers
- Capt. Sidney Waterfield Bunker, Royal Fusiliers
- 2nd Lt. Arthur Hanley Bunning, Royal Garrison Arty.
- Capt. Thomas George Deane Burdett, Royal Welsh Fusiliers
- Q.M. and Temp Honorary Lt. Robert Douglas Burgess, Royal Fusiliers
- Rev. William Gaisford Burgis, Royal Army Chaplains' Dept.
- Tmp 2nd Lt. Harold French Burke, Royal Arty.
- Rev. Henry Beaumont F. Burnaby, Royal Army Chaplains' Dept.
- Tmp Lt. Hugh Hanton Burness, Royal Garrison Arty.
- Capt. James Burnie, Liverpool Reg.
- Rev. Robert Francis Burrow, Royal Army Chaplains' Dept.
- Tmp 2nd Lt. Alfred Edward Burrowes, Royal Dublin Fusiliers
- Tmp Capt. Charles Selss Burrows, Northumberland Fusiliers
- Tmp 2nd Lt. Ralph Withers Burton, East Surrey Reg., attd. Machine Gun Corps
- Lt. Thomas Henry Burton, Royal Marine Light Inf.
- 2nd Lt. William Edgar Bush, Yorkshire Reg.
- Tmp 2nd Lt. Leslie Raymond Butlin, Machine Gun Corps
- Tmp Capt. Alick Byass, Army Service Corps
- Tmp Lt. John Osmer Byrne, Northumberland Fusiliers
- Lt. Frederick Jonathan Bywater, Royal Engineers
- Lt. Felix Clement Vincent Digby Caillard, Somerset Light Inf.
- Lt. Francis Herbert Cairnes, Royal Field Arty.
- C.S. Maj. Richard Martin Callendor, London Reg.
- 2nd Lt. William Cam, Royal Garrison Arty.
- Tmp Capt. Alan Charles Cameron, Devonshire Reg.
- Tmp Capt. John Jackson Cameron, South Staffordshire Reg.
- Tmp Capt. Angus Campbell, RAMC
- Lt. George Campbell, Royal Field Arty.
- Tmp Capt. George Maclean Campbell RAMC
- Tmp Capt. Herbert Campbell, General List
- Tmp 2nd Lt. Hugh Campbell, Royal Engineers
- Capt. Norman Robertson Campbell, Highland Light Inf.
- Tmp 2nd Lt. George Murray-Campigh, General List
- Tmp 2nd Lt. Cyril Victor Canning, Suffolk Reg.
- Capt. Neil Canthe RAMC
- Lt. Arthur Aloysius Carberry, Manchester Reg.
- Tmp Capt. Robert Holegate Cardwell, Royal Engineers
- Capt. Arthur George Cardy, Oxfordshire & Buckinghamshire Light Inf.
- 2nd Lt. Eric Carhart, North Staffordshire Reg.
- Tmp Capt. Alfred Edward Carr, Tank Corps
- Lt. Arthur Ralph Carr, Royal Garrison Arty.
- Tmp Lt. Arthur Leonard Carroll, Royal Engineers
- Tmp Lt. Arthur Borwood Carter, Machine Gun Corps
- Lt. John Lovelace Carter, Army Service Corps
- 2nd Lt. Stanley Cyril Cartel, Royal Engineers
- Lt. William Carter, Royal Lancaster Reg.
- Capt. Francis Xavier Shakeshaft Carus, Royal Field Arty.
- Tmp Capt. Reginald John Cash, North Lancashire Reg.
- Capt. Richard Bewley Caton, Norfolk Reg.
- Tmp Capt. Leonard Arthur Cattley, East Yorkshire Reg.
- Tmp Capt. George Caulfield, Highland Light Inf.
- Capt. Frederick George Cavendish, Leinster Reg.
- Tmp Capt. Ronald de Bode Cazalet, Intelligence Corps
- Tmp Lt. Percy John Cazes, General List, attd. Nyasaland Field Force
- Lt. Frank Chadwick, King's Royal Rifle Corps
- 2nd Lt. William Chalmers, Argyll and Sutherland Highlanders, attd. Machine Gun Corps
- 2nd Lt. Reginald Percy Chamberlain, Royal Engineers
- Lt. Theodore Gervaise Sandeman Chamber, Royal Garrison Arty.
- Capt. Eric Adrian Charles Deschamps Chamier, Lincolnshire Reg.
- Tmp Lt. Alfred Leonard Chandler, Army Service Corps
- Lt. Cyril John Chandler, Royal Field Arty.
- 2nd Lt. Guy Dunston Channon, Royal Field Arty.
- Tmp Capt. Arthur Randolph Chapman, General List
- Tmp 2nd Lt. Arthur Sutherland Chapman, Argyll and Sutherland Highlanders
- Lt. Godfrey Markhaon Charton, Intelligence Dept.
- Lt. Arthur James Child, London Reg.
- Tmp Capt. Corrie Denew Chase, Royal Irish Rifles
- Capt. Francis Clervaux Chaytor, Royal Field Arty.
- Lt. Charles Christie, Army Service Corps
- Tmp Capt. Charles William Christie, Scottish Rifles
- Capt. Geoffrey Christie-Miller, Oxfordshire & Buckinghamshire Light Inf.
- Lt. Arthur Church, Intelligence Dept.
- Tmp Lt. Basil Hampden Church, Royal Garrison Arty.
- Tmp Capt. Valentine William Bland Church, Royal Garrison Arty.
- Lt. Ernest Swann Chuter, Royal Garrison Arty.
- Tmp Capt. Thomas Clapperton, East Kent Reg.
- Lt. Algernon Basil Clark, Royal Highlanders
- Capt. Edmund Graham Clark, Army Service Corps
- Tmp Capt. Frederick William Clark, Royal Engineers
- 2nd Lt. Firstbrook Clarke, North Staffordshire Reg.
- Battery Sergeant Major James Clarke, Royal Field Arty.
- 2nd Lt. Paul Humphrey Clarke, Royal Garrison Arty.
- Capt. William Arthur Clarke, London Reg.
- Rev. Philip Thomas Byard Clayton, Royal Army Chaplains' Dept.
- Tmp Capt. Carleton Main Clement, General List and Royal Flying Corps
- Tmp Capt. Raymond George Heibert Clements, Royal Engineers
- Rev. Thomas Hartley Cleworth, Royal Army Chaplains' Dept.
- Tmp Lt. Robert Clews, Royal Engineers
- Tmp Lt. Bertram Clifford, Army Ordnance Depot
- Tmp Lt. Edmund Henry Clokey, Machine Gun Corps
- Capt. Arthur Butler Clough, Royal Engineers
- Lt. Eric Hamifton Coad, Royal Field Arty.
- Tmp Capt. William North Coates, Royal Garrison Arty.
- Capt. James Stuart Coats, Coldstream Guards
- Tmp Capt. PeterCochran, Royal Engineers
- 2nd Lt. James Aikman Cochrane, Royal Scots Fusiliers, and Royal Flying Corps
- Tmp Capt. Frederick Pepys Cockerell, Special List
- Tmp 2nd Lt. Frank Heibert Colebrook, Royal Engineers
- Lt. Herbert Cecil Coleman, Royal Sussex Reg.
- Lt. Lewis Coleman, Royal Field Arty.
- Capt. Ernest Alfred Coles, London Reg.
- Capt. James Collioun, Royal Inniskilling Fusiliers
- Lt. Cecil Bernard Romer Collenette, London Reg.
- Lt. Angus Lyell Collier, Cameron Highlanders
- Lt. Samuel Collier, Cheshire Reg., and Royal Flying Corps
- Tmp Capt. William Ttegonwell Collier, RAMC
- Rev. Ignatius Collins, Royal Army Chaplains' Dept.
- Capt. John Gordon Collins, Worcestershire Reg., and Nigeria Reg.
- Hon. Lt. Edward Oliver Collison, Army Ordnance Depot
- Lt. Francas John Colston, Royal Field Arty.
- Capt. Christopher Comely, Monmouthshire Reg.
- 2nd Lt. George William Coney, Royal Field Arty.
- Capt. William MaitLand Congreve, Royal Garrison Arty.
- Capt. Clifford Edward Constable, King Edward's Horse
- Rev. Daniel Conway, Royal Army Chaplains' Dept.
- Tmp Capt. Frederick Charles Cook, Royal Engineers
- Tmp Capt. BrianKennedy Cooke, Oxfordshire & Buckinghamshire Light Inf.
- Rav Henry Robert Cooke, Royal Army Chaplains' Dept.
- Tmp Capt. John Campbell Cooke, General List
- Tmp Lt. John Harbourne Cooke, Royal Garrison Arty.
- Tmp Capt. Ronald Campbell Cooke, RAMC
- Lt. Henry Guy Cooper, Indian Army Reserve of Ofc.s
- Tmp Lt. Ralph Cooper, Royal Field Arty.
- Tmp Capt. Robert William Cooper, General List
- Capt. Walter Cooper, Royal Field Arty.
- Tmp Lt. John Coote, Royal Naval Volunteer Reserve
- Capt. Charles Cope, Liverpool Reg.
- Lt. George Arnold Cope, attd. Royal Garrison Arty.
- Capt. Hugh Tithe Copinger-Hill, Suffolk Reg.
- Lt. Leonard Cordingley, West Riding Reg.
- Lt. William Myles Fenton Corry, Royal Field Arty.
- Tmp Capt. Alexander Kirkpatrick Cosgrave RAMC
- Capt. Thomas Joseph Costello RAMC
- Rev. James Aloysius Cotter, Royal Army Chaplains' Dept.
- C.S. Maj. Sidney Herbert Court, Coldstream Guards
- Tmp Lt. Stephen Lewis Courtaud, Worcestershire Reg., attd. Machine Gun Corps
- Rev. Félix Couturier, Royal Army Chaplains' Dept.
- 2nd Lt. John Cowan, Royal Scots
- Lt. Walham Alexander Cowan, Royal Garrison Arty.
- Lt. John Ignatius William Cowgill, Nottinghamshire and Derbyshire Reg.
- Lt. Charles John Cowley, Welsh Reg.
- Capt. Victor Leopold Spencer Cowley, Royal Irish Rifles, attd. Machine Gun Corps
- 2nd Lt. William Eric Cowlishaw, North Staffordshire Reg.
- Capt. Arthur Leslie Cowtan, London Reg.
- Lt. Alfred Hope Gordon Cox, Nottinghamshire and Derbyshire Reg.
- Capt. Lionel Howard Cox, Gloucestershire Reg. and Machine Gun Corps
- Lt. William Hofmeyr Craib, Royal Field Arty.
- Tmp Capt. Robert Ritchie Craig, Border Reg.
- Capt. Thomas Edgar Craik, Yorkshire Light Inf., attd. Machine Gun Corps
- 2nd Lt. Herbert Cranage, Royal Engineers
- Tmp Lt. Charles Tennyson Cranswick, Royal Engineers
- Tmp Capt. Sidney Cranswick, Yorkshire Reg.
- Capt. Alan Edzle Crawford, Royal Garrison Arty.
- Capt. John Risdon Murdoch Crawford, Royal Engineers
- Lt. Richard William Bunney Crawford-Clarke, Royal Garrison Arty.
- Lt. Stanley William Francis Crofts, London Reg.
- Tmp Capt. James Adrian Crombie, Royal Field Arty.
- Capt. Harold Powell Crosland, Yeomanry
- Tmp Capt. Alfred Frank Cross, Royal Welsh Fusiliers
- Tmp Lt. Arthur Max Cross, Suffolk Reg.
- Lt. Maurice Edmund Crossland, London Reg.
- Lt. Francis Harrie Crouch, Lancashire Fusiliers
- 2nd Lt. Percy Crouch, Leicestershire Reg.
- Tmp 2nd Lt. Thomas Alexander Crozier, Royal West Surrey Reg.
- Tmp Capt. Hugh Ellis Davies Cullen, South Staffordshire Reg.
- Capt. James Crossley Cunningham, Argyll and Sutherland Highlanders, attd. Machine Gun Corps
- Tmp Lt. Thomas John Cunnison, Royal Field Arty.
- Tmp Capt. Elliott Bailhe Currie, Royal Engineers
- Lt. John Ralph Willoughby Curtois, Royal Field Arty.
- Capt. Robert Frederick Cuthbert, Oxfordshire & Buckinghamshire Light Inf.
- Tmp 2nd Lt. Francis George Cutts, Royal Engineers
- Capt. Terence Joseph Daintith, Indian Postal Service
- 2nd Lt. Frederick Dale, King's Own Scottish Borderers
- Lt. Charles Dalton, Royal Fusiliers
- Lt. James Naughton Dandie, Royal Garrison Arty.
- Tmp Lt. Reginald George Dianks, Royal West Surrey Reg.
- Tmp 2nd Lt. Henry Herbert Darby, Rifle Brigade
- Lt. Alexander Spears Darrooh, Liverpool Reg.
- 2nd Lt. James Daxroch, Liverpool Reg.
- Capt. Richard Charles Gordon Dartfard, London Reg.
- Lt. Charles Galbon Darwin, Unattd. List
- 2nd Lt. Arthur Allan Orme Davenport, East Lancashire Reg.
- Tmp Capt. Arthur Henry Davenport, Royal Engineers
- Lt. Geoirge Brooking Davey, Liverpool Reg.
- Tmp Capt. John Poison Davidson RAMC
- Tmp 2nd Lt. John Davie, Royal Scots
- Capt. Thomas McNaughbon Davie, RAMC
- Tmp Capt. Arthur Rowland Davies, Royal Engineers
- Capt. Henry Davies, Royal Engineers
- Capt. Henry David Kingsley Davies, Northumberland Fusiliers
- Tmp Capt. James Henry Davies, General List
- C.S. Maj. Tom Davies, Royal Welsh Fusiliers
- Lt. Alexander Horace-Davis, Royal Garrison Arty.
- Tmp Capt. Howard John Vaisey Davis, Army Service Corps
- Q.M. and Hon. Lt. James Davis, RAMC
- Tmp Capt. James Frederick Davison, General List and Royal Flying Corps
- R.S. Maj. John James Dawkins, Royal Warwickshire Reg.
- Lt. Samuel Dawson, Royal Arty.
- Rev. Henry Cyril Day, Royal Army Chaplains' Dept.
- Lt. Julian Day, Yeomanry
- Capt. Richard Day, Royal Field Arty.
- Capt. Ernest Betton Deakin, Essex Reg.
- Tmp Lt. Albert Gardner Dean, South Lancashire Reg.
- Sgt. Major David Edward Dean, RAMC
- Tmp 2nd Lt. Harold Dean, Yorkshire Reg.
- Tmp Lt. Colin Hermann Deane, Army Ordnance Depot
- Tmp Capt. Henry Speldewinde de Boer, RAMC
- Tmp Capt. George Dekin, Royal Fusiliers
- Lt. Victor Shore de Fleurriet Delaforce, Royal Field Arty.
- Tmp 2nd Lt. Frank Delves, Nottinghamshire and Derbyshire Reg.
- Rev. Henry Demaison, Royal Army Chaplains' Dept.
- Capt. Jacob Demeza, London Reg.
- Tmp Capt. George Barlow Dempsey, Manchester Reg.
- Tmp Capt. James Arthur Dermot Dempsey, Royal Flying Corps
- Tmp Lt. Percival Barr Denison, Army Ordnance Depot
- Tmp Capt. Raymond Hugh Denman, Royal Arty.
- Tmp 2nd Lt. William Henry Denne, Wiltshire Reg.
- Tmp Capt. Frederick Stephenson Dent, Army Cyclist Corps
- Capt. John Finlay Dew, Scottish Rifles, Spec. Reserve
- Lt. Gerald Knocker Dibb, Royal Field Arty.
- 2nd Lt. Frederick Charles Dice, Dorsetshire Reg.
- Tmp Capt. Robert Dickie, Argyll and Sutherland Highlanders
- Lt. Norman Ernest Valentine Dicks, Royal Irish Fusiliers
- Tmp Lt. Arthur Larimer Dickson, Army Ordnance Depot
- Capt. Ian Dunbar Dickson Royal Army Medical Corps (RAMC)
- Lt. Richard Wale Gordon Dill, Life Guards
- Capt. William Alfred Dimoline, East Surrey Reg.
- Capt. Sydney Cecil William Disney, Lincolnshire Reg.
- Tmp Lt. Henry Philip Dix, Royal Naval Volunteer Reserve
- Tmp Capt. Oswald Dixon, East African Vet Corps
- 2nd Lt. William Leonard Price Dobbin, Royal Irish Rifles
- C.S. Maj. Walter Harry Dobson, Machine Gun Guards
- Tmp Capt. John Freeman Dodd, Durham Light Inf.
- Rev. Rowland Pocock Dodd, Royal Army Chaplains' Dept.
- Lt. Peter Doig, Royal Engineers
- Lt. William Donald RAMC
- Tmp Sub-Lt. Richard Donaldson, Royal Naval Volunteer Reserve
- Tmp Capt. Francis Donnelly, Royal Engineers
- Capt. Gordon Huxley Donnelly, Royal Garrison Arty.
- Tmp 2nd Lt. Cyril Bernard Donovan, Royal Dublin Fusiliers
- Lt. Thomas Donovan, Royal Garrison Arty.
- Lt. Edward Doolan, Army Service Corps
- Tmp Lt. George Vibert Douglas, Royal Engineers, Northumberland Fusiliers
- Tmp Capt. Percy Gordon Douglas, Royal Engineers
- 2nd Lt. William George Dove, Royal West Kent Reg.
- Lt. John William Downes, Yeomanry
- Capt. Walter Douglas Downes, Royal Sussex Reg. and Nigeria Reg.
- Tmp Capt. Frederick Joseph Downey, Northumberland Fusiliers
- Q.M. and Hon. Capt. Sidney Downing, Devonshire Reg.
- Tmp Capt. Aubrey Osier Dowson, Rifle Brigade
- Tmp Lt. Henry Dinham Drew, Machine Gun Corps
- Tmp Lt. Percy Frederick Drew, Royal Sussex Reg.
- 2nd Lt. Arthur Driver, West Riding Reg.
- Tmp Capt. Godfrey Rolles Driver, Graves Regn. Unit
- Lt. John Christopher Druce, East Surrey Reg.
- Capt. John Ebenezer Drysdale, Army Service Corps
- Capt. Thomas Gerard du Buisson, Royal Field Arty.
- Tmp Capt. George Vernon Dudley, Royal Garrison Arty.
- Lt. Charles Gordon Duff, Royal Field Arty.
- Capt. Granville John Burnley Duff, Norfolk Reg.
- Lt. Walter Geoffrey Dugdale, Yeomanry
- Tmp Lt. Henry Hare Dugmore, King's African Rifles
- Tmp Capt. Reginald George Fitzroy Dumaresq, Machine Gun Corps
- Capt. Carlyle MacGregor Dunbar, late Hussars
- C.S. Maj. David Duncan, Argyll and Sutherland Highlanders
- Capt. Hugn Stewart Duncan, Royal Field Arty.
- 2nd Lt. Lancelot Duncan, Gordon Highlanders
- Tmp Lt. Charles Henry Dunkley, Royal Engineers
- Tmp 2nd Lt. Thomas William Edgar Dunkley, Dorsetshire Reg.
- Tmp 2nd Lt. Patrick Dunne, Royal Engineers
- Lt. Frederick Eustace Dunsmuir, Highland Light Inf.
- Tmp Lt. James Gordon Durham, General List
- 2nd Lt. Donald James Duthie, Royal Warwickshire Reg.
- 2nd Lt. Andrew Marshall Duxbury, Oxfordshire & Buckinghamshire Light Inf.
- Q.M. and Hon. Lt. Harry Dymore, Royal Scots
- 2nd Lt. Eric Eadie, Royal Inniskilling Fusiliers
- Tmp Lt. Arthur Charles Henry Eagles, Army Ordnance Depot
- Lt. Henry Parslow Eames, Royal Engineers
- Q.M. and Hon. Capt. Leonard Eastmead, Rifle Brigade
- Tmp Lt. Harold Edmund Eastwood, Army Ordnance Depot
- Lt. John Patrick Echlin, Royal Engineers
- Tmp Sub-Lt. Charles James Eddolls, Royal Naval Volunteer Reserve
- Lt. Ivan John Edell, Royal Field Arty.
- Capt. John Green Edgar, Ofc.s Training Corps, employed Duke of Cornwall's Light Inf.
- Lt. Arthur Wayman Edwards, York & Lancaster Reg.
- Capt. Bartle Mordaunt Marsham Edwards, Rifle Brigade
- 2nd Lt. John Wesley Edwards, Yeomanry
- B.Q.M. Sgt. Robert Henry Edwards, Lancashire Fusiliers
- Lt. Richard Huyshe Eliot, Army Service Corps
- Tmp Capt. Joseph Haslett Elliott RAMC
- Rev. Ernest Sayer Ellis, Royal Army Chaplains' Dept.
- Tmp Capt. Norman Thomas Ellis, Royal Engineers
- Tmp Capt. Arthur David Ellison, Royal Field Arty.
- Lt. James Frederick Ellison, Royal Marine Light Inf.
- Staff Sergeant Major Alexander Ellwood, Army Service Corps
- Tmp Capt. Herbert Emerson RAMC
- Tmp Capt. Charles Arthur Emery, Liverpool Reg.
- Lt. James Esmonde, Royal Dublin Fusiliers
- C.S. Maj. Charles Martin Estall, East Surrey Reg.
- Capt. Emerys Hunter Evans, Royal Welsh Fusiliers
- Tmp Capt. William Henry Evans, General List, Nyasaland Field Force
- Tmp Capt. William Herbert Evans, Northamptonshire Reg.
- Tmp Capt. William Martin Evans, Royal Engineers
- Lt. Arthur Charles Tarver Evanson, East Surrey Reg., attd. Machine Gun Corps
- Tmp Lt. Peicy Briant Everett, York & Lancaster Reg.
- Capt. John Fullerton Evetts, Scottish Rifles
- Tmp Capt. William Alfred Evetts, Royal Garrison Arty.
- Lt. Chetwode Percy Evill, Indian Army Reserve of Ofc.s
- Tmp Capt. Brian Walter Fagan, Oxfordshire & Buckinghamshire Light Inf.
- Tmp Capt. Gerald Watson Failes, Norfolk Reg.
- Capt. Leslie John Fairchild, Wiltshire Reg.
- Q.M. and Hon. Lt. Robert Fairley, London Reg.
- Lt. Greame Ogilvie Fairlie, Machine Gun Corps
- Rev. George Moncur Fairweather, Royal Army Chaplains' Dept.
- Lt. Charles Gower Fannin, Royal Garrison Arty.
- Capt. Cecil Graham Farquharson, Royal Marine Light Inf.
- Lt. Francis Archibald Farquharson, Indian Army Reserve of Ofc.s
- 2nd Lt. Robert Berresf ord Fawcett, Royal Scots Fusiliers
- Tmp 2nd Lt. John Halifax Feggetter, Northumberland Fusiliers
- Capt. Robert Humphrey Feilden, Royal Field Arty.
- 2nd Lt. John George Fielder, Royal Garrison Arty.
- Rev. John Green Fenn, Royal Army Chaplains' Dept.
- Tmp Capt. Alexander Ferguson Royal Irish Fusiliers
- Tmp Capt. John Caldwell Fergusson, RAMC
- C.S. Maj. Frank Field, Royal Lancaster Reg.
- 2nd Lt. Percy Filkins, Royal Field Arty.
- Capt. Richard Finch, Royal Army Veterinary Corps
- Q.M. and Hon. Lt. Frederick Wilham Findlay, Gordon Highlanders
- Tmp Lt. Hugh Carswell Findlay, King's African Rifles
- Lt. John Francis Finn, Essex Reg.
- Capt. Arthur Claude Finnimore, Royal Engineers
- Rev. Joseph Firth, Royal Army Chaplains' Dept.
- Tmp Lt. Sydney Howard Fish, Royal Naval Volunteer Reserve
- Tmp 2nd Lt. Henry Cecil-Fisher, Middlesex Reg.
- Tmp Lt. Edwin William Conquest Flavell, Machine Gun Corps
- Tmp Capt. Charles Ernest Fleischl, Army Service Corps
- Capt. Basil Lindley Fletcher, Manchester Reg.
- Tmp Capt. The Hon. Hugh Lawrence Fletcher Moulton, Royal Garrison Arty.
- Tmp Lt. Hugh Flint, Hampshire Reg.
- Capt. Basil Edward Floyd, Royal Garrison Arty.
- Capt. Richard Cunningham Foot, Royal Field Arty.
- 2nd Lt. Henry Norman Forbes, Lancers
- Tmp Capt. Edward Maurice Ford, Army Service Corps
- Tmp Lt. Harry Edward Richard Ford, Royal Welsh Fusiliers
- Capt. John Meredith Randle Ford, Indian Army
- Capt. Henry Marshall Fordham, Royal Engineers
- Tmp Lt. Eric Ford Jones, Royal Field Arty.
- 2nd Lt. Frederick Richmond Forster, Royal Field Arty.
- Tmp Lt. Bernard Theobald Foss, Middlesex Reg.
- Q.M. and Hon. Capt. Harry William Foster, Royal Irish Rifles
- Tmp Capt. Henry William Berkely Foster, Northumberland Fusiliers
- Lt. Cuthbert Lloyd Fox, Royal Engineers
- Capt. Harold Fox, London Reg.
- Tmp Lt. Douglas Foxley Foxwell, Rifle Brigade
- Lt. Hugh Douglas Peregrine Francis, Yeomanry
- Tmp Lt. Robert Alfred Frank, East Yorkshire Reg.
- Capt. Thomas Alderman Franklin, Bedfordshire Reg.
- Lt. Joseph Nicholson Franks, Border Reg.
- Tmp Capt. Angus Alexander Fraser, Army Service Corps
- Capt. Andrew Knowles Fraser, Seaforth Highlanders
- Capt. Cecil Fraser, North Staffordshire Reg.
- Tmp Capt. Gilbert Fraser, Royal Engineers
- Capt. Simon Fraser, Royal Scots
- Capt. Cecil Rayner Freeman, Northumberland Fusiliers
- C.S. Maj. Esau John Fremlm, Grenadier Guards
- Rev. Reginald French, Royal Army Chaplains' Dept., Lancashire Fusiliers
- 2nd Lt. George Whitely Frend, Royal Field Arty.
- Lt. Jasper Gray Frere, Suffolk Reg. attd. Machine Gun Corps
- 2nd Lt. Oliver Harry Frost, Middlesex Reg. and Royal Flying Corps
- Capt. John Sidney Fulton, Lancashire Fusiliers
- 2nd Lt. Horace John Furminger, Border Reg.
- Lt. Charles Guy Gaden, Connaught Rangers
- Lt. Geoffrey Holroyd Gadsden, Northamptonshire Reg.
- Lt. James Winton Garden, Royal Highlanders, attd. Machine Gun Corps
- Lt. George Dudley Gardner, Yorkshire Reg., and Royal Flying Corps
- Tmp 2nd Lt. Percy George Garon, Army Service Corps
- Battery Sergeant Major Charles Henry Garraway, Royal Field Arty.
- Capt. Frank Harrold Garraway, London Reg.
- Tmp 2nd Lt. Arthur Edwin Garrison, York & Lancaster Reg.
- Battery Sergeant Major Edward Garton, Royal Field Arty.
- Lt. John Arthur Gascoyne-Cecil, Royal Field Arty.
- Tmp Lt. Hubert Douglas Gaunt, King's Own Yorkshire Light Inf.
- Capt. Arthur William Gaze, London Reg.
- Lt. Francis Stanley Gedye, Royal Field Arty.
- Capt. Nicholas Geldard, West Riding Reg.
- 2nd Lt. Harold Marriot Gell, Royal Engineers
- Capt. James Dunlop Gemmill, Royal Engineers
- 2nd Lt. Herbert Horace, George, Royal Garrison Arty.
- Tmp Capt. Lawrence Unthank Geraty, RAMC
- Capt. Lord Frederick John Gerard, Royal Horse Guards
- Tmp Capt. Robert Gibbon, Manchester Reg.
- Lt. Frederick Gibbons, London Reg.
- Tmp Capt. William Percy Gibbons, Manchester Reg.
- Lt. Arthur Gibbs, Welsh Guards
- Rev. Andrew Gibson, Royal Army Chaplains' Dept.
- 2nd Lt. Charles Prosser Gibson, Royal Engineers
- Capt. Colin William George Gibson, Royal Fusiliers
- Tmp Lt. Charles Gray Gosling Gilbert, Machine Gun Corps
- 2nd Lt. Thomas Fleming Gilkison, Royal Field Arty.
- Act. Capt. Donald Gill, Royal Garrison Arty.
- Rev. Robert Gillenders, Royal Army Chaplains' Dept.
- Lt. John Gillespie, Royal Field Arty.
- Capt. William John Gilpm, Royal Garrison Arty.
- Tmp Lt. Colin Macdonald Gilray, Rifle Brigade
- 2nd Lt. Rudolf Gjertsen, Essex Reg.
- Tmp Capt. Keith Stewart Murray Gladstone, General List
- Q.M. and Hon. Lt. Arthur Ernest Glass, RAMC
- 2nd Lt. John McGowan Glen, Royal Scots, attd. Royal Flying Corps
- Lt. Manwell Alexander Burns Glen Royal Garrison Arty.
- Capt. Charles Edward Glenn, York & Lancaster Reg.
- 2nd Lt. Arthur Earnshaw Glentonr Welsh Reg.
- Lt. John Bagot Glubb, Royal Engineers
- Capt. Ralph George Campbell Glyn, Rifle Brigade
- Capt. Robert Trevor Wallace-Glynn, Royal Field Arty.
- Lt. Ernest Gordon Godfrey, London Reg.
- Tmp Lt. Howard Godfrey, Army Service Corps
- Capt. Leslie Guy Gold, Hertfordshire Reg.
- Lt. Claude John Dashwood Goldie, Royal Field Arty.
- Lt. Kenneth Thackeray Gooch, Royal Field Arty.
- Lt. Norton Butler Napier Good, Machine Gun Corps
- Lt. Tom Goodall, West Riding Reg.
- Capt. Eric Whitlock Goodman, Royal Garrison Arty.
- Tmp Capt. Edward, Gordon, RAMC, Royal Highlanders
- Tmp Lt. Grahame Massey Gordon, Royal Engineers
- Capt. Ronald Eagleson Gordon, Royal Engineers
- Tmp Lt. Leonard Gorringe, General List
- Capt. Hugh Henry Eyre Gosset, Royal Engineers
- Capt. Philip Gottwaltz, South Wales Borderers
- Q.M. and Hon. Capt. Patrick Goudy, Royal Highlanders
- Lt. Claud Goulder, Royal Field Arty.
- Capt. Arnold Charles Gover, Indian Army
- 2nd Lt. Charles James Graham, London Reg.
- Capt. Douglas Alexander Henry Graham, Scottish Rifles
- Tmp Capt. John Gibson Graham, Royal Scots Fusiliers
- Tmp Lt. Richard Grand, Norfolk Reg.
- Lt. Clarence Welham Grange, Royal Garrison Arty.
- Lt. Frederick Grant, Royal Garrison Arty.
- Tmp 2nd Lt. Jokn Grant, Highland Light Inf.
- Tmp Lt. John Robert Grant, Royal Engineers
- Lt. Stuart Grant, Royal Warwickshire Reg.
- Tmp Lt. Thomas Francis Wiltshire Grant, Royal Engineers
- Capt. David Logan Gray, Scottish Rifles
- 2nd Lt. Roderick Hubert Gray, Royal Arty.
- Tmp Lt. Frederick Charles Green, Intelligence Corps
- Capt. Frederick James Green RAMC
- 2nd Lt. William Charles Green, East Yorkshire Reg.
- Capt. Wilfrid Arthur Greene, Oxfordshire & Buckinghamshire Light Inf.
- 2nd Lt. Hugh Martin Greener, Northumberland Fusiliers
- 2nd Lt. Norman Greenslade, Devonshire Reg.
- Tmp 2nd Lt. Wilfrid Greensmith, Nottinghamshire and Derbyshire Reg.
- Tmp Capt. William Foster Greenwood, Yorkshire Reg.
- Capt. William Wells Greer FRCS RAMC
- Tmp Capt. Ernest Walter Gregory, Royal Field Arty.
- 2nd Lt. Joseph Grellis, Border Reg.
- Tmp Lt. Charles Grey, General List, Rhodesia National Reg.
- Lt. Walter Barrett Joseph Grey, Royal Field Arty.
- 2nd Lt. William Stanley Grice, Royal Garrison Arty.
- Tmp Capt. James Henry Grieve, Army Ordnance Depot
- Capt. John Cauldwell Grieve, RAMC
- Tmp Capt. Cyril Cobham Griffith, Hampshire Reg.
- Lt. Cyril John Ivor Griffith, Royal Field Arty.
- Tmp Lt. Gordon Grift Griffiths, Unatt. List, Royal Arty.
- Tmp Capt. Kenyon Boxwell Griffith-Williams, Royal Engineers
- Tmp Lt. Sydney Alfred Groom, Royal Field Arty.
- Tmp Lt. Stewart Jewell Grose, Royal Field Arty.
- Rev. St. John Beverly Groser, Royal Army Chaplains' Dept.
- Lt. Edward Julian Groves, Cheshire Reg.
- 2nd Lt. Humphrey Halgrim Grundtvig, Leicestershire Reg.
- Lt. Thomas Reginald Grylls, Leicestershire Reg.
- Capt. Stanley Edward Gudgeon, Royal Garrison Arty.
- Lt. Richard Noel Guest, Royal Arty.
- Capt. Haji Sulaiman Gulam-hossein Haji, Indian Medical Service
- Tmp Lt. Eric McEvoy Gunning, Machine Gun Corps
- Lt. Derrick Wellesley Gunston, Irish Guards
- Tmp Capt. William Ernest Gurry, Royal Engineers
- Capt. Ivan Douglas Guthrie, Cav., Indian Army
- Lt. Kenneth Malcolm Guthrie, Durham Light Inf.
- Lt. Bernard Gordon Guy, Royal Field Arty.
- Capt. John Richard Gwyther, Manchester Reg.
- Tmp Capt. Leonard Leith Hadley RAMC
- Lt. Eustace Charles Hagen, Royal Field Arty.
- Capt. Gordon Stewart Haggle, Northumberland Fusiliers
- 2nd Lt. Ernest Frank Hailstone, Royal Fusiliers
- Tmp Capt. Leslie Robert Halford, Nottinghamshire and Derbyshire Reg.
- Capt. Montague Walter Halford, Gloucestershire Reg.
- Capt. Allan Gordon Hall, Royal Field Arty.
- Tmp Capt. Cecil William Hall, Army Service Corps
- Lt. Lionel Cuthbert Hall, Royal Engineers
- Lt. Reginald Clifford Hall, York & Lancaster Reg.
- Tmp Capt. Ronald Owen Hall, General List
- Lt. Robert Victor Hall, Royal Field Arty.
- Capt. Frederick Plassey Hallifax, Royal Garrison Arty.
- 2nd Lt. Howard George Hallum, Hampshire Reg.
- Capt. James Hamilton, Royal Scots Fusiliers
- Tmp 2nd Lt. John Hamilton, Army Service Corps
- Tmp Lt. Harry Thomas Hammond, Royal Fusiliers
- Capt. Alfred Christopher Hammond-Searle, RAMC
- 2nd Lt. Arthur Cecil Hampson, Royal Garrison Arty.
- Tmp Capt. Stuart Hirst Hampson, Lancashire Fusiliers
- Lt. Wilfred Hampson, Royal Engineers
- 2nd Lt. Eric James Hampton, Durham Light Inf.
- Tmp Capt. Noel Hector Hampton, Royal Sussex Reg.
- Tmp Q.M. and Hon. Lt. Alexander Hanauer, Army Service Corps
- 2nd Lt. Harris Kirkland Handasyde, Royal Scots
- 2nd Lt. Arthur Sheldon Hands, Dorsetshire Reg.
- 2nd Lt. Neville Hands, Royal Warwickshire Reg.
- Lt. Robert William Hannah, Royal Field Arty.
- 2nd Lt. William Alexander Hanton, Royal Engineers
- Capt. Allan Francis Hardwick, London Reg. and Machine Gun Corps
- Q.M. and Hon. Capt. Edwin Harding, Royal Fusiliers
- Capt. Fred Hardman, Manchester Reg.
- Lt. Cyril Dupa Hardwick, Royal Field Arty.
- 2nd Lt. Thomas William Hardwick, West Yorkshire Reg.
- Lt. Charles Cecil Harland, South Staffordshire Reg.
- 2nd Lt. William Thomas Harnott, Royal Garrison Arty.
- Capt. Sidney Harper, South Staffordshire Reg.
- Capt. George James Reginald Harris, Liverpool Reg.
- Tmp Capt. John Anthony Harris, Yorkshire Reg.
- Tmp 2nd Lt. Bernard Hope Harrison, Royal Munster Fusiliers
- Tmp Lt. Wilmot Earl Harry, Royal Engineers
- 2nd Lt. Frederick Hart, Welsh Reg.
- 2nd Lt. Joseph Aubrey Hart, East Surrey Reg.
- Tmp Lt. Stanley Graham Hart, Royal Field Arty.
- Tmp Lt. Sydney Hartley, Worcestershire Reg.
- Tmp 2nd Lt. Norman Holt Hartshorne, Royal Engineers
- Tmp 2nd Lt. Arthur Williams Harvey, East Surrey Reg.
- Capt. Humphrey le Fleming Fairfax Harvey, Royal Field Arty.
- Hon. Lt. Edward Higham Haslam, Army Ordnance Depot
- Tmp Capt. John Fearby Campbell Haslam RAMC
- Tmp Capt. Thomas Ernest Hastings, Royal Inniskilling Fusiliers
- Capt. Roger Bernard Lawson Hatch, Bedfordshire Reg.
- Lt. Hubert Christopher Hatton-Hall, King's Own Scottish Borderers
- Rev. William Thomas Havard, Royal Army Chaplains' Dept.
- Tmp Lt. Horace Stanley Havelock, Royal Fusiliers
- Tmp Capt. Arthur Joseph Hawes, RAMC
- Capt. James Godfrey Hawkey-Shepherd, Yeomanry
- 2nd Lt. Kenneth Edwards Hawkins, Royal Fusiliers
- Tmp Capt. Longney Hawkins, King's African Rifles
- Tmp Capt. Harold Granwell Aloysius Haynes, RAMC
- Capt. Horace Penzer Haynes, Royal Field Arty.
- Lt. Frank Hay ward, Royal Engineers
- Rev. Frederick John Hazledme, Royal Army Chaplains' Dept.
- 2nd Lt. Peter Charles Aislabie Head, Royal Field Arty.
- 2nd Lt. Max Herbert Hem, Yorkshire Light Inf.
- Rev. George Francis Helm, Royal Army Chaplains' Dept.
- Capt. Garnet Montgomery Hume Henderson, Highland Light Inf.
- Lt. Matthew Bolam Henderson, Royal Field Arty.
- Tmp Capt. Cecil Augustus John Hendriks, Yorkshire Light Inf.
- Lt. Richard George Hennessy, Border Reg.
- Capt. Thomas Hennessy, Rifle Brigade
- Tmp Lt. William Ainsworth Henri, Northumberland Fusiliers
- Tmp Lt. William Gaudie Henry, Royal Engineers
- Tmp Lt. Arthur Frank Newman
- Henstack, Nottinghamshire and Derbyshire Reg.
- Tmp Capt. David Hepburn, Army Service Corps
- Tmp Capt. George Stanley Hepburn, Royal Field Arty.
- Capt. Walter Herd, Royal Highlanders
- Tmp Capt. Fredenck Joseph Herzog, Royal Field Arty.
- Tmp Capt. Albert Hesling, Lancashire Fusiliers
- Tmp 2nd Lt. Alan Dickinson Hetherington, General List
- Tmp Lt. Francis Herbert Hetherington, Seaforth Highlanders
- Tmp Capt. Reginald Charles Hewson, East Yorkshire Reg.
- Capt. Henry Frank Heywrood, Royal Garrison Arty.
- Lt. Frederick Hubert Hickman, Royal Engineers
- Tmp Capt. William Longton Hicks, General List
- Battery Sergeant Major Francis Alexander Higgins, Royal Field Arty.
- Lt. William Samuel Higgins, Royal Field Arty.
- Capt. John Norman Hildick-Smith, South Staffordshire Reg.
- Tmp Capt. Frederick James Hill, Royal Irish Rifles
- Tmp Lt. Lindsay Arthur Hill, Royal Engineers
- Tmp Capt.William Ernest Hill, Middlesex Reg.
- Q.M. and Hon. Capt. William Henry Hill, West Yorkshire Reg.
- Tmp Capt. Harold Drummond Hillier, Gloucestershire Reg.
- Tmp Capt. George Tom Hilton, Army Service Corps
- Tmp Capt. Richard Cop eland Dentocn Hind, Royal Sussex Reg.
- Tmp Lt. Thomas Hinde, Rifle Brigade
- Tmp Capt. John Tatham Hines, Royal Engineers
- 2nd Lt. Charles Allen Hinton, Royal Engineers
- Tmp 2nd Lt. Alexander David Hislop, Royal Engineers
- Capt. Frank Bridge Hitchcock Royal Garrison Arty.
- 2nd Lt. Francis Brigstocke Hitchings, Devonshire Reg., attd. Machine Gun Corps
- Capt. Francis Bromley Hobbs, Bedfordshire Reg.
- Tmp Capt. Howard Frederick Hobbs, attd. Welsh Reg.
- Tmp Capt. Hugh George Hobson, RAMC
- Capt. Matthew Hodgart, Royal Engineers
- Lt. Alexander Phelps Hodges, Royal Field Arty.
- Tmp Capt. Edward Norman Hodges, Army Service Corps
- Tmp 2nd Lt. Walter Frederick Clarke Holden, Royal Engineers
- Tmp Lt. Harold Thomas Holdstock, Yorkshire Light Inf.
- Capt. Michael James Holland, King Edward's Horse
- Tmp Capt. Tom Herbert Holland, Royal Field Arty.
- Capt. Edmund John Hunt Holley, Devonshire and Royal North Devonshire Yeomanry
- Tmp Capt. Aubrey Hollingworth, General List
- Lt. Harold McLean Hollingworth, Yorkshire Reg.
- Tmp Capit Rudolph Hollocombe, South Staffordshire Reg.
- Lt. Geoffrey Holmes, Royal Field Arty.
- Tmp Capt. Hugh Oliver Holmes, Royal Field Arty.
- Tmp Capt. Gerald Holroyde, RAMC
- Tmp Lt. Robert Kenneth Holt, Dorsetshire Reg.
- Tmp Capt. Percy Frederick Hone, General List
- Tmp Capt. Hilary Ralph Hood, Royal Garrison Arty.
- Tmp Lt. Arthur Wellesley Hoodey, Army Service Corps
- Capt. Alfred George Hooper, Lincolnshire Reg.
- Tmp Capt. Granville Hooper-Sharpe, Rhodedian Veterinary Service
- Capt. Arthur Oswald James Hope, Coldstream Guards
- Capt. Kelham Kirk Horn, Royal Flying Corps
- Capt. Trevor Langdale Horn, Lancers
- Capt. Alan Edgar Home, Yeomanry
- Lt. Herbert Eric Horsfield, Royal Engineers
- Capt. Cecil Dove Horsley, Lancers
- 2nd Lt. Leonard George Hosking, London Reg.
- Lt. Henry Walter Houldsworth, Seaforth Highlanders
- Capt. Herbert Hough, South Lancashire Reg.
- 2nd Lt. Frederick Leonard Houghton, Royal Warwickshire Reg.
- 2nd Lt. Bertram Beaman Houston, Royal Garrison Arty.
- 2nd Lt. Robert Baldwin Hovey, Royal Engineers
- Tmp Capt. Frederick Ernest Howard, Royal Field Arty.
- Lt. Harry Safe Howard, Yorkshire Light Inf.
- 2nd Lt. Ronald Arthur Scovell Howes, South Lancashire Reg.
- 2nd Lt. Herbert Hubble, Rifle Brigade
- Tmp Lt. Richard Melvil Fane Huddart, Royal Engineers
- Tmp 2nd Lt. John Oromie Hudson, Army Service Corps
- Tmp Capt. William Hudson, Royal Engineers
- Tmp Lt. Digby Huffam, Royal Engineers
- Tmp 2nd Lt. Cyril Thomas Hughes Royal Engineers
- Capt. Daniel Joseph Hughes, Royal Army Chaplains' Dept.
- Capt. Leslie Edward Hughes, RAMC
- Sgt. Major Walter Hughes, Grenadier Guards
- Tmp C.S. Maj. Thomas Anthony Hughes, Army Service Corps
- Tmp Lt. Lyman Sawley Hull, Royal Welsh Fusiliers
- Tmp Capt. Walter Grove Hull, Royal Field Arty.
- Lt. Charles Arthur Phillimore Hulls, Seaforth Highlanders, and Machine Gun Corps
- Tmp Lt. Spencer Robert Humby, Royal Engineers
- Capt. Harold Victor Hummel, Royal Field Arty.
- Tmp Capt. Henry Herbert Humphreys, Army Service Corps
- Tmp Capt. John Nelson Humphrey RAMC
- Tmp Capt. Gerald Norman Hunnybun, Yorkshire Reg.
- Lt. Arthur Lionel Hunt, Royal Arty.
- Tmp Capt. Geoffrey Hunt Hunt, Royal Engineers
- Capt. William Hunt, London Reg.
- Tmp Capt. Douglas Macinnes Hunter RAMC
- Tmp Capt. William Henry Hunter, Army Service Corps
- Tmp Capt. Edward Mitchell Huntriss, West Riding Reg.
- Lt. Edgar Simon Hurlbatt, Manchester Reg.
- Lt. Percival Hurlbutt, Yeomanry Battalion, Royal Welsh Fusiliers
- Capt. Thomas Hutchesson, Royal Guernsey Light Inf.
- Rev. Hugh William Hutehings, Royal Army Chaplains' Dept.
- Tmp Lt. Herbert Heatley Hutchinson, Royal Garrison Arty.
- Rev. Samuel Hutchinson, Royal Army Chaplains' Dept.
- Lt. Cecil Tait Hutchison, Royal Field Arty.
- Lt. George John Hutchison, Royal Field Arty.
- Tmp Capt. David Lindsay Hutton, RAMC
- Tmp 2nd Lt. William Sherrin Huxley, attd. Royal Flying Corps
- 2nd Lt. Henry David Hyams, London Reg.
- Tmp Capt. Howard Leahe Hyett, Royal Field Arty.
- Tmp Capt. Douglas Edward Ince, Durham Light Inf.
- Tmp Capt. Norman Sedgwick Ince, Manchester Reg.
- Capt. Thomas Douglas Inch RAMC
- Capt. Joseph Ellis Inglis, Royal Garrison Arty.
- Capt. Kenneth Guthrie Ireland, Royal Arty.
- Tmp Lt. Leonard Archibald Frederick Ireland, Royal Sussex Reg.
- Rev. Henry Massingberd Irvin, Royal Army Chaplains' Dept.
- Tmp Lt. Basil Hippisley Jackson, Royal Horse Arty.
- Lt. Clement Jackson, Royal Garrison Arty.
- Capt. Guy Rolf Jackson, Yeomanry
- Capt. Harold Bravence Jackson, East Yorkshire Reg.
- Lt. Harold Jackson, Manchester Reg.
- Lt. Lindsay Forbes Jackson, Royal Garrison Arty.
- Lt. Adrian Ingram James, Royal Field Arty.
- Tmp Capt. Harold Morton James, Middlesex Reg.
- Lt. Walter Richmond James, Royal Engineers
- Tmp Capt. Charles Henry Jarvis, Northumberland Fusiliers
- Capt. Thomas Kilvington Jeans, Royal Horse Arty.
- Tmp Capt. Ernest Edward Jelbart, Royal Army Veterinary Corps
- Tmp Lt. Edgar Ernest Jenkins, Royal Warwickshire Reg.
- Tmp Capt. Gerald Kerr Jenkins, Royal Field Arty.
- Battery Sergeant Major Percy John Jenkins, Royal Field Arty.
- Tmp Q.M. and Hon. Lt. Robert Jennings, Royal Scots
- Lt. Reginald Herbert Jerman, Royal Welsh Fusiliers
- Tmp Lt. Charles Edward Jiggms, Royal Fusiliers
- Tmp Capt. Anthony Joseph Jimenez, Royal West Kent Reg.
- Lt. Robert Howard Jobson, Royal Field Arty.
- Lt. Maurice Richard Johannessen, Royal Garrison Arty.
- Tmp Capt. Oscar Claridge Johnsen, General List
- Capt. Dudley Graham Johnson DSO South Wales Borderers
- Tmp Capt. Edgar Harry Johnson, Yorkshire Light Inf.
- Tmp Lt. Gordon Ross Johnson, Royal Engineers
- Hon. Lt. Harry Bertram Johnson, Army Ordnance Corps
- Lt. Rayner Harvey Johnson, Royal Garrison Arty.
- Tmp 2nd Lt. Alexander le Burn Johnston, Royal Engineers
- Capt. Lewis Downsh Joll, Royal Garrison Arty.
- Lt. Archibald Henry Jolhffe, Cheshire Reg.
- Tmp 2nd Lt. Arthur Leslie Jones, Royal Engineers
- 2nd Lt. Arthur Llewellyn Jones, East Surrey Reg.
- Tmp Lt. Ernest Sidney Jones, Army Ordnance Depot
- Capt. George Worthington Jones, Royal Horse Arty.
- Tmp Capt. Glyn Mostyn Jones, Royal Welsh Fusiliers
- 2nd Lt. Herbert Brian Jones, Wiltshire Reg.
- R.S. Maj. John Owen Jones, Cheshire Reg.
- Tmp Capt. John Robetnt Jones, Royal Field Arty.
- Tmp Capt. John Thomas Jones, Army Service Corps
- Tmp Capt. Percy Lewis Jones, Royal Garrison Arty.
- Q.M. and Hon. Capt. Philip Henry Jones, Lincolnshire Reg.
- Tmp Capt. Robert Arthur Jones, Norfolk Reg.
- Tmp Q.M. and Hon. Lt. Thomas Jacob Jones, Royal Welsh Fusiliers
- Lt. Albert Edward Jordan, Royal Garrison Arty.
- Lt. John Reginald Claridge Jorgensen, Royal Field Arty.
- 2nd Lt. Robert Charles Jull, Royal Garrison Arty.
- Tmp Lt. Robert Louis Kay, Cheshire Reg.
- Lt. Reginald Joseph Kaye, Royal Garrison Arty.
- Lt. James William Keating, Royal Field Arty.
- Tmp Q.M. and Hon. Lt. Thomas Keay, Lancashire Fusiliers
- Lt. William Esmé Kelly, Border Reg.
- Lt. Charles Hall Kelsall, Lancashire Fusiliers
- Tmp Lt. Luther James Kedsey, South Staffordshire Reg.
- Lt. John Henry Kemp, Army Service Corps
- Lt. Ernest Elliott Kennedy, Indian Army
- Capt. Bertram Maurice Kenny, Royal West Surrey Reg.
- Capt. Joseph Robert Kenyon, Royal Field Arty.
- Tmp Capt. John Bertram Keville, Royal Arty.
- Capt. Gordon Cecil Kennard, Royal Engineers
- Lt. Lord Hugh Kennedy, Coldstream Guards
- Lt. James Russell Kennedy, Royal Garrison Arty.
- Q.M. and Hon. Lt. Herbert John Kent, London Reg.
- Capt. Tom Raonsden Kenworthy, RAMC
- 2nd Lt. Arthur Oliver Kersey, Shropshire Light Inf.
- Capt. Hew Ross Kilner, Royal Garrison Arty.
- Tmp Capt. Brian Arthur Douglas Kinahan, Royal Engineers
- Tmp Capt. Stanley Lancaster Kind, York & Lancaster Reg.
- 2nd Lt. Bernard Ellis King, Norfolk Reg.
- Tmp Lt. Cecil Bishop Redman King, Machine Gun Corps
- Capt. Charles Stuart King, Royal Garrison Arty.
- 2nd Lt. Edward Goddard King, West Yorkshire Reg.
- Tmp Capt. Hugh Basil King, Northamptonshire Reg.
- Tmp 2nd Lt. Herbert Greniell King, Northumberland Fusiliers
- Capt. Harold Lepme Kirby, Royal Fusiliers
- Tmp Lt. Henry McKenzie Kirkby, Army Ordnance Depot
- Capt. Colin Drummond Kirkpatrick, Royal Garrison Arty.
- Tmp Capt. William Kirkwood, Royal Scots
- Tmp Lt. William Campbell Kirkwood, Royal Garrison Arty.
- Tmp Capt. Ahck Edmond Knight RAMC
- Lt. Royston Engleheart Knight, Royal Engineers
- Lt. Walham Thomas Knight, Royal Garrison Arty.
- Tmp Capt. Frederick Hammett Knott, Wiltshire Reg.
- Tmp Capt. Roger Birkbecfe Knott, Lancashire Fusiliers
- Tmp Capt. Alexander Campbell White Knox RAMC
- Tmp Lt. Edward Ritchie Knox, Royal Arty.
- Tmp Lt. Jean Antoine Kurten, Royal Garrison Arty.
- Tmp Lt. Thomas Butler Labarte, Royal Field Arty.
- Tmp Lt. George Thomas Labey, Royal Engineers
- Tmp Capt. Wallace Laing, Royal Arty.
- Tmp Capt. James Martin Laird Royal Field Arty.
- Q.M. and Hon. Lt. Ernest Kirkland Laman, South Wales Borderers
- Tmp Lt. Christopher Lambeth, Army Service Corps
- Tmp 2nd Lt. Mortimer William Henry Lancaster, South Wales Borderers
- Lt. John Langler, Royal Arty., Royal Field Arty.
- Tmp Capt. John Athelstane Trend Langdon, North Staffordshire Reg.
- Capt. Walter George Largen, Royal Field Arty.
- 2nd Lt. Arthur Moore Lascelles, Durham Light Inf.
- Capt. William Henry Laslett RAMC
- Lt. Charles Latrobe, Hampshire Reg.
- Battery Sergeant Major Alexander Lauder, Royal Field Arty.
- Tmp Capt. Joseph Henry Laurie, Royal Army Veterinary Corps
- Capt. Hou Henry Astell Law, Yorkshire Light Inf.
- Rev. James Henry Adeane Law, Royal Army Chaplains' Dept.
- Tmp Lt. Charles Alfred Lawrence, Bedfordshire Reg.
- Tmp Lt. John Wilson Lawson, Machine Gun Corps
- Tmp 2nd Lt. William Brereton Lawton-Goodman, Army Service Corps
- Tmp Capt. Charles Laycock, Royal Engineers
- Capt. Stanley Charles Layzell, Intelligence Dept.
- 2nd Lt. Eric George Leader, Royal Engineers
- Capt. James Allan Gordon Leask, Royal Lancaster Reg.
- Lt. David Henry Leek, Border Reg., attd. Machine Gun Corps
- Tmp Capt. Charles Henry Lee, Manchester Reg.
- Capt. James Lyell Lee, Lancashire Fusiliers
- 2nd Lt. James Vernon Lee, Yeomanry
- Capt. Ralph Trenchard Leo, Royal Field Arty.
- Tmp Capt. Alec Antony Lees, RAMC
- Tmp Lt. George Poingdestre Lefebvre, Northumberland Fusiliers
- 2nd Lt. Edmund Charles le Good, Royal Garrison Arty.
- Lt. John Alexander Leigh, Royal Garrison Arty.
- 2nd Lt. John Walter Dickinson Leigh, Army Cyclist Battalion and Royal Flying Corps
- Capt. Reginald Heber Leigh, RAMC
- Lt. Douglas Meldrum Watson Leith, Gordon Highlanders
- Tmp Capt. Hubert Francis Augustine le Mesurier, Cheshire Reg.
- Tmp 2nd Lt. Eric Smithyman Lennard, Tank Corps
- Tmp Capt. Arthur Stanley le Rossignol, General List
- Lt. Alexander Addis Leslie, Royal Field Arty.
- Capt. Cecil George Leslie, Dragoon Guards
- Tmp Capt. Oswald Edward Henry Leslie, Royal Garrison Arty.
- Lt. Rupert John Leversha, Yeomanry
- 2nd Lt. William Egbert Leveson, Royal Garrison Arty.
- Tmp 2nd Lt. Carl Norton Levin, Northumberland Fusiliers
- Lt. Ralph Paul Levy, Middlesex Reg.
- C.S. Maj. John Arthur Lewis, Royal Engineers
- Tmp Lt. Goroorwy Claude Lewis, Tank Corps
- Tmp Capt. Max Lewis, General List
- Tmp Lt. William Lewthwaite, Machine Gun Corps
- Tmp Lt. Cecil Frederick Joseph Liddell, King's Royal Rifle Corps
- Tmp Capt. Frank Horace Liddell, General List, formerly Royal Warwickshire Reg.
- Tmp Lt. Guy Maynard Liddell, Royal Field Arty.
- Tmp Capt. Kenneth Thomas Lambery, RAMC
- Lt. John William Lincoln, Royal Engineers
- Tmp Lt. James Henry Coddington Lindesay, Army Cyclist Corps
- 2nd Lt. Bernard Lindop, Cheshire Reg.
- Capt. Leslie Stuart Lindsey-Renton, London Reg.
- R.S. Maj. William Lightfoot, Border Reg.
- Lt. Archibald John Child Lintott, London Reg.
- Tmp Capt. Percy Collins Litchfield, RAMC
- Tmp Capt. Joscelme William Littleton, Royal Field Arty.
- Lt. John Jestyn Llewellin, Royal Garrison Arty.
- Rev. Herbert Thomas Lloyd, Royal Army Chaplains' Dept.
- Tmp Lt. Robert Llewellyn Mandeville Lloyd, Shropshire Light Inf.
- Capt. William Alexander Charles Lloyd, West Yorkshire Reg.
- Tmp Capt. Griffith Ellis Lloyd-Jones, East Yorkshire Reg.
- Tmp Capt. Geoffrey Denis Lock, Devonshire Reg.
- Tmp Capt. Thomas Percy Locking, New Armies
- Act. Capt. Geoffrey Owen Lockwood, Royal Engineers
- Lt. Luckey Lockwood, Royal Field Arty.
- Capt. George Sherwin Lockwood, Lancashire Fusiliers
- Tmp Capt. Conrad Loddiges, RAMC
- 2nd Lt. James Logan, Royal Engineers
- Capt. Joshue Arthur Barber Lomax, Royal Field Arty.
- Capt. Norman Veatch Lothian RAMC
- Capt. Harry Leslie Bache Lovatt, South Staffordshire Reg.
- Capt. William Muncaster Lovatt, Royal Garrison Arty.
- Tmp Lt. Frederick Stephen Low, Royal Field Arty.
- Act. Major William Alexander Low, Royal Field Arty.
- Tmp Capt. Frederick William Lown, Tank Corps
- Lt. Geoffrey Grant Lowndes, Royal Field Arty.
- Lt. Norman Charles Leslie Lowth, Lancashire Fusiliers
- Lt. Ralph Hugh Lubbock, Royal Field Arty.
- Capt. John de Blaquiere Tindall Lucas, Royal Field Arty.
- Tmp Capt. Reginald Hutchison Lucas, RAMC
- Tmp Lt. Alan Lumb, Royal Arty., Royal Field Arty.
- Tmp Capt. Arthur Douglas Lumb, Royal Engineers
- Tmp Capt. George James Sanderson Lumsden, Cameron Highlanders
- Q.M. and Hon. Lt. Richard Lumsden, Royal Inniskilling Fusiliers
- Tmp Q.M. and Hon. Lt. Arthur Patrick Lunam, Nottinghamshire and Derbyshire Reg.
- Tmp 2nd Lt. Reginald Owton Lunn, Labour Corps
- Rev. David Colville Lusk, Royal Army Chaplains' Dept.
- Capt. Peter Young Lyle, Argyll and Sutherland Highlanders
- Capt. William James Lyle, Highland Light Inf.
- Tmp Capt. Charles Gabriel Joseph Lynam, Royal Engineers
- Lt. Alfred Cecil Lynn, Yorkshire Light Inf.
- C.S. Maj. Richard Mabbott, Royal Fusiliers
- Lt. Herbert Carteighe Maben, Worcestershire Reg.
- Tmp Capt. James Chateau McArthur, Army Service Corps
- Tmp Capt. James Simpson McArthur, General List, late King's Own Scottish Borderers
- Tmp Capt. Donald Boyd Macaulay, Seaforth Highlanders
- Lt. William Robert Brown McBain, Royal Field Arty. and Royal Flying Corps
- Lt. William James McBeath, Highland Light Inf.
- Tmp Capt. Frederick Johnston McCall, Royal Army Veterinary Corps
- 2nd Lt. David McCarthy, Liverpool Reg.
- 2nd Lt. Thomas George McCarthy, London Reg.
- 2nd Lt. Tyndall McClelland, Highland Light Inf.
- Capt. Charles McCombie, Gordon Highlanders
- Tmp Capt., William McConnell RAMC
- Capt. Henry Ernest McCready RAMC
- Tmp Capt. Thomas Robert McCready, Royal Marines, and Machine Gun Corps
- 2nd Lt. James Thompson McCubbin, Liverpool Reg.
- 2nd Lt. David John McCullough, Royal Irish Rifles
- 2nd Lt. Alexander MacDonald, Argyll and Sutherland Highlanders
- Lt. Andrew Garfield MacDonald, London Reg.
- Lt. John Alexander MacDonald, Royal Field Arty.
- Capt. Douglas James McDougall, Royal Scots
- Capt. Thomas McEwen, RAMC
- Tmp Capt. John Mandeville MacFie RAMC
- Lt. William Richard Arundel McGee, Royal Field Arty.
- Tmp Capt. Jackson McGowan, Army Ordnance Depot
- Lt. James Allister McGregor, Argyll and Sutherland Highlanders
- Lt. Cyril Michael McHale, South Lancashire Reg.
- Lt. Alfred Charles McIntosh, Royal Engineers
- Lt. Douglas Bentley McIntosh, Liverpool Reg.
- Capt. Reginald George Macintyre, Durham Light Inf.
- Lt. Robert Hamilton Montgomery McIntyre, Yeomanry
- Tmp Capt. William Keverall McIntyre RAMC
- Lt. Norman Balfour McIvor, Middlesex Reg.
- Tmp Capt. Magnus Ross Mackay RAMC, attd. Royal Field Arty.
- Tmp Lt. Arthur Murdo Mackenzie, Royal Engineers
- Lt. Donald Ross Mackenzie, Royal Field Arty.
- 2nd Lt. lan Dawson Mackenzie, Royal Dublin Fusiliers
- Lt. Henry Erskine McKie, Royal Field Arty.
- Tmp Capt. John Wallace MacKinlay, Scottish Rifles
- Q.M. and Hon. Lt. David McLachlan, Royal Highlanders
- Tmp 2nd Lt. James Menzies MacLachlan, General List, attd. Trench Mortar Battery
- Capt. Thomas McLaren, Royal Garrison Arty.
- 2nd Lt. George Hugh Maclear, Cheshire Reg.
- Lt. James Younger McLean, Royal Field Arty. and Royal Flying Corps
- Capt. Ronald MacLear, attd. Army Service Corps
- B.Q.M. Sgt. William Laidlow MacLean, Royal Scots Fusiliers
- Tmp Lt. Kenneth Thomas McLelland, Royal Engineers
- Capt. Kenneth MacLennan, RAMC
- Lt. James McMichael, Highland Light Inf.
- Lt. John MacMurray, Royal Field Arty.
- Tmp 2nd Lt. Robert McMurray, Royal Engineers
- Capt. Arthur Thomas McMurrough-Kavanagh, Hussars
- R.S. Maj. Morgan George McNama, Connaught Rangers
- Tmp Lt. John McNicholl, Seaforth Highlanders
- Lt. Malcolm McNicholl, Yorkshire Light Inf.
- Tmp Capt. Charles Ogte Maconachie, Royal Army Veterinary Corps
- Tmp 2nd Lt. Edmiston MacGregor MacQuarrie, Royal Engineers
- 2nd Lt. James McWilliam, Liverpool Reg.
- Tmp Capt. Percy Hamilton Maflin, Royal Engineers
- 2nd Lt. Collin Arthur Maguire, Royal Engineers
- Q.M. and Hon. Capt. Thomas Mahony, Royal Irish Reg.
- 2nd Lt. William John Maidment, Welsh Reg.
- Tmp Capt. Sidney John Male, King's Royal Rifle Corps
- Q.M. and Hon. Lt. Joseph Rupert Malbon, Royal Engineers
- 2nd Lt. Clifford Angus Mallam, Royal Berkshire Reg.
- Tmp Capt. Herbert Reginald Mallett, Middlesex Reg.
- 2nd Lt. Robert Maltby, Lancashire Fusiliers
- Rev. Leslie George Mannering, Royal Army Chaplains' Dept.
- Battery Sergeant Major William Marchant, Royal Garrison Arty.
- Tmp Lt. Arthur Ronald Mares, Northumberland Fusiliers
- Tmp Q.M. and Hon. Lt. John William Marriott, Nottinghamshire and Derbyshire Reg.
- Tmp R.S. Maj. William David Marsden, Northamptonshire Reg.
- Capt. Frank Douglas Marsh, RAMC
- Tmp Lt. Charles William Marshall, Liverpool Reg.
- Capt. Edward Nixon Marshall, West Riding Reg.
- Tmp Capt. Eric Stewart Marshall, RAMC
- Capt. Harold Marshall, Hampshire Reg.
- Lt. Leslie Phillips Marshall, West Yorkshire Reg.
- Tmp Capt. Frederic Edward Marston, Royal Engineers
- 2nd Lt. Howard de Courcy Martelh, Royal Army Chaplains' Dept., attd. 62nd Division
- Tmp Lt. Ernest Wilfred Leigh Martin, 24th Divisional Train
- Q.M. and Hon. Capt. Richard Henry Martin, Monmouthshire Reg.
- 2nd Lt. Clive Harrison Martyn, Northamptonshire Reg.
- Tmp Capt. Graham William Massingham, Army Service Corps
- Lt. Reginald Frank Mason, Royal Field Arty.
- Capt. Edgar Alan Masters, Army Service Corps
- Q.M. and Hon. Capt. Frederick William Masters, Lincolnshire Reg.
- Tmp Capt. James Frederick Matheson RAMC
- Tmp Lt. Felton Arthur Hamilton Mathew, Royal Engineers
- Lt. Alexander, John Mathieson, Royal Field Arty.
- Lt. Frederick Keith Matthew, North Lancashire Reg.
- 2nd Lt. Percy Thomas Matthews, London Reg.
- Q.M. and Hon. Lt. John Hannaford Maunder, RAMC
- Tmp Lt. Hugh Rochfort Maxsted, General List
- Tmp Lt. Arthur Lionel May, Royal Welsh Fusiliers
- Capt. John Edwin Maynard, London Reg.
- 2nd Lt. William Herbert Lisle Medford, Royal Garrison Arty.
- Capt. Ernest Anthony Meek, Durham Light Inf.
- Capt. Robert Meiklejohn, Army Service Corps
- Rev. Charles Gustave Clark Meister, Royal Army Chaplains' Dept.
- Tmp 2nd Lt. John Barnett Mennie, Cheshire Reg.
- Tmp Lt. Horace George Merriok, Royal Garrison Arty.
- Tmp Capt. Mark Hepper Merry, Welsh Reg.
- Tmp Capt. Charles Campbell Metcalfe, General List
- Lt. Everard Charles Meynell, Royal Field Arty.
- 2nd Lt. William Charles Frederick Meyrick, Devonshire Reg.
- Lt. William Godwin Michelmore, Royal Engineers
- Lt. Rupert Charles Godfrey Middleton, Royal Sussex Reg.
- Lt. Stanley Wayman Milburn, Headquarters, Royal Field Arty.
- Tmp Lt. Arthur Tremayne Miles, King's African Rifles
- Tmp Lt. Brynmor Miles, Royal Field Arty.
- Tmp Capt. Archibald Underwood Millar RAMC
- Capt. John Miller, RAMC
- Capt. James Bruce Miller, Royal Engineers
- Tmp Lt. Percy Maurice Miller, Royal Irish Rifles
- Tmp Capt. Edgar Edward Mills, South Wales Borderers
- Capt. Frederick Leighton Victor Mills, Royal Field Arty.
- Tmp Capt. Lacey Burchett Mills, East Surrey Reg.
- 2nd Lt. Stanley Wayre Mills, Royal Field Arty.
- Capt. Harold Aubrey Milton, London Reg.
- Tmp Capt. Frank Miskin, Suffolk Reg.
- Tmp Lt. James Hendrie Mitchell, Border Reg.
- Tmp Capt. John Malcolm Mitchell, General List
- Tmp Sub Lt. Lionel George Mitchelmore, Royal Naval Volunteer Reserve
- Tmp Lt. George Hamilton Moberly, Machine Gun Corps
- Capt. Stanley Moffett, Northumberland Fusiliers
- Q.M. and Hon. Lt. Joseph Patrick Mogam, East Yorkshire Reg.
- Tmp Capt. John Donald Mollett, Royal Engineers
- Lt. Caryl Richard Molyneux, 10th Hussars
- Lt. John Henry Monaghan, Leinster Reg.
- Lt. Hugh Benyon Monier-Williams, Suffolk Reg.
- Tmp Lt. Henry William John Monk, Royal Engineers
- Capt. Frederick James Osbaldeston Montagu, Coldstream Guards
- Capt. Monthermer Stanley Hume Montague, East African Forces
- Capt. Eustace William Montgomerie, Norfolk Reg.
- Tmp Lt. Francis James Dudingston Montgomerie, Royal Engineers
- Capt. Robert Vandeleur Montgomery, Somerset Light Inf.
- 2nd Lt. Phillips Burney Sterndale Gybbon Monypenny, Royal West Kent Reg.
- Lt. Mark Sprot, Moody-Stuart, Royal Field Arty.
- Tmp Lt. Claud Augustus Moore, Royal Fusiliers
- Capt. Cedric Gell Moore, Manchester Reg.
- Lt. Harry Andrew Moore, Royal Garrison Arty.
- Capt. John Francis Cumberlege Mordaunt, Somerset Light Inf.
- Tmp Lt. Gerald Alexander McKay Morant, West Yorkshire Reg.
- Tmp Capt. James Sharah Hunuford Morgan, King's African Rifles
- Tmp Capt. Montagu Trovers Morgan, RAMC, attd. King's African Rifles
- Lt. Sydney Hubert Morgan, Royal Engineers
- Lt. Charles Stewart Morice, Worcestershire Reg., and Royal Flying Corps
- 2nd Lt. Frederick Alexander Morrell, East Kent Reg.
- 2nd Lt. Thomas Morrill, Royal Garrison Arty.
- 2nd Lt. Arthur Frank Morris, Royal Field Arty.
- 2nd Lt. Thomas Hooper Morns, Royal Engineers
- Rev. William Frederick Morns, Royal Army Chaplains' Dept.
- 2nd Lt. Charles Esmond Morrisoin, Leicestershire Reg.
- Tmp Capt. Reginald Sperling Morshead RAMC
- 2nd Lt. Alfred Ellenngton Morton, Royal Lancaster Reg.
- Tmp Capt. Ralph Morton, Lancashire Fusiliers
- Lt. David William Moss, Royal Garrison Arty.
- 2nd Lt. Edward Mount, Royal Engineers
- Tmp Capt. William Samuel Mounteney, Royal Garrison Arty.
- 2nd Lt. John Alexander Mowat, Hampshire Yeomanry, attd. Hampshire Reg.
- Tmp Lt. Patrick Desmond Mulholland, Machine Gun Corps
- Capt. William Mulholland, Mil. Lab. Bur
- 2nd Lt. Robert Mullaney, Yorkshire Reg.
- Tmp Lt. Douglas Graham Munro, Machine Gun Corps
- Tmp Capt. James Stewart Grahahm Munro, Royal Field Arty.
- Tmp Lt. John James Munro, Royal Engineers
- Q.M. and Hon. Lt. Benjamin Murdoch, Royal Scots
- Capt. William Murdoch RAMC
- Lt. Charles Alexander Phipps Murison, Royal Field Arty.
- Tmp Capt. Arthur John Murphy, Royal Welsh Fusiliers
- Tmp Capt. John William Mnse, Royal Field Arty.
- Tmp Capt. Hanley Musker, Lancashire Fusiliers
- 2nd Lt. Ernest Francis Hume Murray, Honourable Arty. Company
- Tmp 2nd Lt. George Scott Murray, General List and Royal Flying Corps
- Tmp Q.M. and Hon. Lt. John Grant Murray, Royal Marines, attd. Field Ambulance
- Tmp Lt. Patrick Moncreiff Murray, General List, attd. Inf. Brigade
- Tmp Capt. William Patrick Murray, Northumberland Fusiliers
- Capt. Charles William Chester Myles RAMC
- Capt. Ian Couper Nairn, Yeomanry
- Tmp Lt. Reginald Lancelot Naah, Royal Field Arty.
- Lt. Robert Percy Nathan, Royal Field Arty.
- Tmp Capt. John Neal, Royal Garrison Arty.
- Tmp Capt. Charles James Neale, Royal Field Arty.
- Capt. Alfred Owen Needham, Lancashire Fusiliers
- Tmp Lt. John Barrie Neilson, Machine Gun Corps
- Lt. Andrew Edmondson Walsh Nesbitt, Royal Garrison Arty.
- Lt. James Edmund Henderson Nevalle, Oxfordshire & Buckinghamshire Light Inf.
- 2nd Lt. Frederick Newcomb, Hampshire Reg.
- Capt. John Geoffrey Newell, West Yorkshire Reg.
- Tmp Q.M. and Hon. Capt. James Newton, Royal Irish Rifles
- Tmp Capt. George McLaughlm Niccol, Royal Field Arty.
- Tmp Lt. Charles Brian Nichols, Suffolk Reg.
- Capt. James Nichols, London Reg.
- Capt. Morres Nickalls, Yeomanry
- Tmp Lt. Edwin Nickerson, Royal Engineers
- Capt. Ralph Kenneth Taylor Nightingale, Lancashire Fusiliers
- 2nd Lt. Stuart Henry Nooks, Royal Field Arty.
- Tmp Capt. Stanley Node-Miller, Royal Highlanders
- Lt. Reginald Edward Norrds, Rifle Brigade, attd. Machine Gun Corps
- Tmp Lt. Thomas Pilkington Norris, Royal Engineers
- Rev. Phillip Mary Northcoite, Royal Army Chaplains' Dept., attd. Cheshire Reg.
- Capt. Francis John Nugee, Leicestershire Reg.
- 2nd Lt. Maurice Twemilow Nunnerley, Lancashire Fusiliers
- Tmp Lt. Edmund Roy Nurse, Machine Gun Corps
- Tmp Lt. Mervyn Alexander MacGregor Oakford, Machine Gun Corps
- Lt. Sydney Edward Odgers, Machine Gun Corps
- Capt. Sidney O'Donel, Mob Vet Sec, Royal Army Veterinary Corps
- C.S. Maj. Charles O'Donovan, Royal Fusiliers
- Act. Sgt. Major Walter George Ogden, Army Ordnance Corps
- 2nd Lt. Maurice Tremble Ogilvie, Royal Garrison Arty.
- 2nd Lt. Cyril Okell, Field Company, Royal Engineers
- Lt. William Mathias O'Kelly, Army Service Corps
- Rev. Henry Douglas Oldfield, Royal Army Chaplains' Dept.
- Tmp Capt. William Joshua Oliver, Durham Light Inf.
- Tmp Lt. John Stuart Omond, Army Ordnance Depot
- 2nd Lt. Edward Freer Orgill, North Staffordshire Reg., attd. Manchester Reg.
- 2nd Lt. John Augustus Oriel, Royal Garrison Arty.
- Tmp Lt. Henry Ormandy, Royal Engineers
- Tmp 2nd Lt. Vernon Winton Ory, Army Service Corps
- Tmp 2nd Lt. Ernest John Osborn, General List, and Trench Mortar Battery
- Tmp Lt. Thomas Broadbent Osbourne, Cable Section, Royal Engineers
- Q.M. and Hon. Lt. Robert William John Osmond, Middlesex Reg.
- 2nd Lt. Andrew Geraint Joseph Owen, Welsh Reg.
- Capt. Herbert Charles Owen, Middlesex Reg.
- Capt. Walter Hayes Oxley, Royal Engineers
- Lt. James Leslie Padmore, Royal Warwickshire Reg.
- Tmp 2nd Lt. Arthur Frederick Page, Royal Warwickshire Reg.
- Tmp Capt. Parker Sutton Page, Royal Fusiliers
- Tmp Lt. Albert Arthur Painting, Machine Gun Corps
- Capt. Ridley Pakenham-Pakenham-Walsh, Royal Engineers
- Capt. Edward Chippendall Palmer, West Riding Reg.
- Battery Sergeant Major William Palmer, Royal Garrison Arty.
- Q.M. and Hon. Lt. Walter Palmerr King's Royal Rifle Corps
- 2nd Lt. Charlie Pannall, Royal West Surrey Reg.
- Tmp Capt. Arthur George Pardoe, Royal Engineers, Royal Monmouthshire Reg.
- Lt. John Brown Park, Scottish Rifles, attd. Cameron Highlanders
- Lt. George Henry Parker, Royal Arty., and Gold Coast Reg.
- 2nd Lt. Cecil Joseph Parker, Royal Engineers
- Lt. Robert Parker, North Lancashire Reg. attd. Light Trench Mortar Battery
- Q.M. and Hon. Lt. Sidney Parker, Worcestershire Reg.
- 2nd Lt. John Parkin, Royal Garrison Arty.
- Capt. George Westhead Parkinson, Royal Engineers (formerly North Lancashire Reg.)
- 2nd Lt. John Bertram Parks, Essex Reg., attd. 2nd New Zealand Machine Gun Corps
- 2nd Lt. William Hamilton Parnisr East Kent Reg.
- 2nd Lt. Arthur Cyril Lawes Parry, Yorkshire Reg., attd. Royal Lancaster Reg.
- Tmp Capt. Guy William Parry, RAMC
- Lt. Charles Roy Parsons, Oxfordshire & Buckinghamshire Light Inf.
- Lt. Harold Archer James Parsons, Royal Engineers
- 2nd Lt. John Henry Parsons, Yeomanry
- 2nd Lt. Robert Henderson Parsons Royal Engineers
- Lt. Thomas Crompton Parsons, East Lancashire Reg.
- Tmp Lt. Richard Douglas Passey RAMC, attd. King's Royal Rifle Corps
- Lt. Christopher Parvin, Border Reg.
- Tmp Capt. Montgomery Paterson Paton RAMC
- Tmp Capt. William McCutcheon Patrick, Royal Engineers
- Tmp Lt. William Cyril Paul, Duke of Cornwall's Light Inf.
- Tmp Capt. Charles Frederick Pavitt, Army Service Corps
- Tmp Capt. Sydney Archibald Payne, York & Lancaster Reg.
- Tmp Lt. Henry Goold Pearce, Royal Engineers
- Tmp Capt. Cecil Pearson, Royal Garrison Arty.
- Capt. Frank Stanley Pearson, Dorsetshire Reg., attd. East Lancashire Reg.
- Capt. Robert Tute Pearson, Army Service Corps
- Capt. Philip John Sherwin Pearson-Gregory, Grenadier Guards
- 2nd Lt. Thomas Edward Peart, Durham Light Inf.
- Tmp 2nd Lt. Nicholas Arthington Pease, East Surrey Reg.
- Lt. Charles Urie Peat, Yeomanry
- Lt. Ronald Tennyson Peel, Seaforth Highlanders
- Tmp Capt. Harold Benjamin Pegrum, Lancashire Fusiliers
- Tmp Capt. Richard Laurence Stapylton Pernberton, Durham Light Inf.
- Lt. George Tresham Pender, Indian Army
- Lt. John Hawkes Pendered FRCS RAMC
- Tmp Capt. Edgar Ambrose Pengelly, Royal Engineers
- Tmp Capt. Arthur Robert Penny, and Royal Flying Corps
- Tmp Capt. Helier George Percival, Welsh Reg.
- Lt. John Lakeman Percival, Nottinghamshire and Derbyshire Reg.
- Tmp Lt. Sydney Cockerill Percival, Royal Engineers
- Tmp Lt. Gerard Henry Perkins, Yorkshire Reg.
- 2nd Lt. Richard Edgecumbe Perrett, London Reg.
- Lt. Eric Wingfield Pert, Royal Engineers
- Capt. Henry Sydney Charles Peyton, Rifle Brigade
- Tmp 2nd Lt. Richard Charles Philipp, Royal Engineers
- Lt. Cecil Ernest Lucas Phillips, Royal Garrison Arty.
- 2nd Lt. Clive Alexander Phillips, Honourable Arty. Company
- Tmp Capt. Edwin Gray Moneylaws Phillips, Royal Highlanders
- Tmp Capt. Frank Phillips, General List
- Lt. Stephen Noel Hamilton Phillips, Royal Field Arty.
- Lt. Edward Clement Philpott, Royal Field Arty.
- Tmp Capt. Hugh Alfred Philpott, Royal Field Arty.
- 2nd Lt. Thomas Picton, South Wales Borderers, attd. Royal Welsh Fusiliers
- Capt. Wilfred Gould Pidsley, London Reg.
- Lt. Gerald Robert Pirn, Royal Engineers
- Capt. Harold Senhouse Pinder, Leicestershire Reg., attd. King's African Rifles
- Hon. Capt. Hugh Lewis Pine, Army Ordnance Depot
- Capt. Ivan Miller Pirrie RAMC
- Lt. Howard Earl Pitt, Royal Field Arty.
- Capt. Robert Elliot Pitts, RAMC
- Capt. Harvey Forshaw Plant, Royal Field Arty.
- Tmp Lt. Samuel Platten, Royal Engineers
- 2nd Lt. Leslie Graham Plumbly, Bedfordshire Reg.
- 2nd Lt. Geoffrey Howard Plummer, Royal Irish Rifles, attd. Machine Gun Corps
- Tmp Lt. John Edward Barker Plummer, Liverpool Reg.
- Tmp Lt. Asher Price, HTown Reg.
- Tmp Capt. Axel Jonas Alfred Poignant, West Yorkshire Reg.
- Tmp Capt. William Arnold Polglaze, Royal Field Arty.
- Capt. Leopold Thomas Poole RAMC
- Tmp Lt. Reginald Alfred Beisly Pope, Motor Machine Gun Corps
- Lt. George Basil Porter, British West Indies Reg.
- Tmp Lt. Harold Edward Lionel Porter, Royal Engineers
- Lt. William Abbotts Porter, North Staffordshire Reg.
- Capt. William Edge Porter, Leicestershire Reg.
- Lt. Benjamin Henry Potter, Royal Garrison Arty., attd. Army Ordnance Depot
- Tmp Lt. Frank Thomas Potter, Army Ordnance Depot
- 2nd Lt. George Edwin Potter, Hussars, attd. King's Royal Rifle Corps
- Tmp Capt. Gordon Alan Potts, Lancashire Fusiliers
- C.S. Maj. William Powell, King's Royal Rifle Corps
- Tmp Lt. Charles Montague Power, Scottish Rifles
- 2nd Lt. Herbert Raphe Power, West Riding Reg. attd. Gloucestershire Reg.
- Tmp Lt. Albert Maurice Pratt, Machine Gun Corps
- Capt. Reginald Stanley Pratt, Nottinghamshire and Derbyshire Reg., attd. Trench Mortar Battery
- Lt. Evan Bertram Charles Preston, Indian Army Reserve of Ofc.s, attd. Indian Inf.
- Lt. Frederick Allen Preston, Royal Field Arty.
- Capt. Overton Inett Preston, Nottinghamshire and Derbyshire Reg. and Royal Flying Corps
- Capt. Harold Pretty, Suffolk Reg.
- Capt. Harry Sibree Price, London Reg.
- Capt. Charles Stafford Price-Davies, King's Royal Rifle Corps
- Tmp Capt. Edward Andrews Priestland, King's African Rifles
- Lt. Jonathan Lee Priestman, Royal Field Arty.
- Tmp Lt. Evan Pritchard, Royal Engineers
- Tmp Capt. Geoffrey John Pritchard, Royal Engineers
- Capt. Richard George Proby, Yeomanry
- Tmp Capt. John Clifford Proctor, Gloucestershire Reg.
- Lt. John, Norman William Atkinson Procter, West Riding Reg.
- Tmp Lt. Roderick Norman Lloyd Protheroe, Royal Field Arty.
- Tmp Capt. George Raphael Buick Puree RAMC
- Capt. Hedley Thomas Wright Quick, Royal Berkshire Reg.
- Capt. Berkeley Campbell Quill, Royal West Surrey Reg. (Scottish Horse Yeomanry)
- Lt. Charles Goldie Radcliffe, Royal Field Arty.
- Lt. John Norman Radcliffe, Royal Garrison Arty.
- Lt. Thomas Townsend Radmore, Royal Field Arty.
- Tmp Capt. Cecil Probyn Napier Raikes, Royal Engineers
- Capt. Adam Rankme RAMC
- 2nd Lt. Albert Morrison Ransom, King's Royal Rifle Corps
- Lt. Ralph Albert Raphael, Royal Warwickshire Reg.
- Tmp 2nd Lt. Frank Louis Ratto, Royal Welsh Fusiliers
- Tmp 2nd Lt. George Norman Rawlence, Duke of Cornwall's Light Inf.
- Lt. George William Rawlings, Royal Engineers, attd. Labour Corps
- C.S. Maj. William Benjamin Rawlings, Royal Welsh Fusiliers
- Tmp Capt. Harold Raymond, General List
- Capt. Richard Valentine Read, Essex Reg.
- 2nd Lt. Wilbam Read, Yorkshire Light Inf.
- Tmp Lt. Frederick Albert Reading, Worcestershire Reg.
- 2nd Lt. Ernest Join Readings, Yorkshire Reg.
- Capt. Ernest George Redway, Royal Irish Reg.
- Tmp Capt. August George Rehm, General List, East Africa Pay Corps
- 2nd Lt. Archibald Reid, Royal Field Arty.
- Lt. Alexander Eraser Reid, Royal Engineers
- Lt. Doug-las Muir Reid, Royal Field Arty.
- Tmp Capt. Horace Arthur Reid, Royal Engineers, attd. Australian Engineers
- 2nd Lt. John Reid, Royal Highlanders
- Lt. John Spence Read, South Staffordshire Reg.
- Lt. Norman Reid, Royal Field Arty.
- Tmp Q.M. and Hon. Lt. William Reid, Royal Inniskilling Fusiliers
- Tmp Capt. William Brown Rennie, General List
- Tmp Capt. Walter Lancaster Renwick, Labour Corps
- Lt. Roy Alfred Rice, Indian Army, attd. Lancers
- Capt. Leslie John Richards, Suffolk Reg.
- Tmp Lt. Mark Fielding Richards, Suffolk Reg.
- C.S. Maj. Arthur Edward Richardson, Rifle Brigade
- Capt. Harry Richardson, Royal Engineers
- Lt. Roland Richardson, Cokes Rifles attd. Pathans, Indian Army
- Lt. George Arthur Rdckards, Royal Field Arty.
- Tmp Lt. Sydney Riddell, York & Lancaster Reg.
- Capt. Arthur George Rigby, West Yorkshire Reg.
- Capt. Thomas Ridgwiay, South Lancashire Reg.
- Tmp Q.M. and Hon. Capt. Ralph Musk Ridley, Suffolk Reg.
- Tmp Lt. Harold Riley, Royal Engineers
- Q.M. and Hon. Lt. Thomas Riley, West Yorkshire Reg.
- Capt. Oswald Harbord Ripley, Royal Garrison Arty.
- Lt. Arthur Roberts, Royal Engineers
- Capt. Charles Eustace Roberts, Northamptonshire Reg., and Nigeria Reg.
- 2nd Lt. Donald Farquharson Roberts, East Surrey Reg.
- 2nd Lt. Eric Mark Roberts, Northumberland Fusiliers
- Tmp 2nd Lt. Harold Roberts, South Staffordshire Reg.
- Capt. James Ronald Roberts, Royal Engineers, attd. Railway Corps
- Tmp Capt. William Roberts, Royal Field Arty.
- Capt. Angus Robertson, Royal Garrison Arty.
- Capt.Alexander Wmton Robertson, Royal Garrison Arty.
- Lt. Brian Hubert Robertson, Royal Engineers
- Lt. Cyril John Robertson, Royal Field Arty.
- Lt. Donald Stewart Robertson, South Lancashire Reg.
- Capt. Hector Murdoch Maxwell Robertson, Royal Arty., attd. Royal Flying Corps
- 2nd Lt. Leonard Dougal Robertson, King's Own Scottish Borderers
- Tmp Capt. William Berry Robertson, General List
- Capt. William Henderson Robertson, Royal Garrison Arty.
- Capt. William Latto Robertson Field Amb, RAMC
- Tmp Lt. Christopher Robinson, King's Royal Rifle Corps
- Tmp Lt. Cecil Joseph Robinson, Royal Field Arty., attd. Survey Company, Royal Engineers
- 2nd Lt. Frederick Henry Robinson, Lincolnshire Reg., and Nigeria Reg.
- Lt. Godfrey Robinson, Royal Field Arty.
- Capt. Leslie Maurice Robinson, Lancashire Fusiliers
- Capt. Thomas Robinson, Royal Field Arty.
- Lt. John Stanley Jefferson Robson, Northumberland Fusiliers, attd. Army Cyclist Corps
- Capt. Maurice James Roche Indian Medical Service
- Tmp Capt. John Moyes Rodd, Army Ordnance Depot
- C.S. Maj. Robert Rodger, Argyll and Sutherland Highlanders
- Tmp 2nd Lt. William Albert Rodwell, Royal Engineers
- Tmp Lt. Edward Allen Roe, East Surrey Reg., attd. Royal West Surrey Reg.
- Tmp Lt. John Alfred Rogers, East Surrey Reg.
- Sgt. Major Leslie Rogers, Nottinghamshire and Derbyshire Reg.
- Capt. Cecil John Rogerson RAMC
- Tmp Capt. Alfred Rollo, General List
- 2nd Lt. Anton Eric Romyn, Royal Field Arty.
- Lt. Percy Roscorla, Royal Field Arty.
- Lt. William Leonard Roseveare, Royal Engineers
- Tmp Capt. Launcelot Hugh Ross, General List
- Tmp 2nd Lt. Peter Graham Ross, East Lancashire Reg.
- Capt. Ronald Deane Ross, Irish Horse
- Capt. Hubert James Cecil Rostron, Dragoon Guards
- Tmp Lt. Philip Rought, Royal Engineers
- Capt. Francis Leyland Lyster Fyler Roupell, Royal Garrison Arty.
- Tmp Capt. Hugh Shearer Rowan, Royal Garrison Arty.
- Tmp Lt. Josiah Arthur Vivian Rowe, Royal Engineers
- Tmp Capt. George Kowell, Army Service Corps
- 2nd Lt. John Sumner Rowley, Leicestershire Reg.
- C.S. Maj. John James Rowson, King's Royal Rifle Corps
- Tmp Capt. John Hewitt Roxburgh, Machine Gun Corps
- Tmp Capt. Dennis Carlton Royle, Royal Fusiliers
- Tmp Capt. Gordon Wilfred Ritchie Rudkin, RAMC
- Tmp Capt. Alexander Walter Runciman, Royal Engineers
- Capt. Alexander Russell, Mil. Lab. Bur
- Capt. Charles Cooper Russell, Royal Field Arty.
- Capt. Edmund Uniacke Russell, RAMC
- Tmp Capt. George Black Russell, Royal Scots
- Capt. Herbert Russell, Royal Field Arty.
- Lt. Hugh Russell, Royal Engineers
- Tmp Lt. Reginald Owen Russell, Royal West Kent Reg.
- Capt. Thomas Foster Rutledge, Royal Flying Corps Spec. Reserve
- Lt. Charles Cedric Ryan, Royal Garrison Arty.
- Tmp Capt. Martin Ryan, Royal Fusiliers
- Tmp Lt. William Tuke Sainsbury, West Yorkshire Reg.
- Tmp Capt. Frederick John Salmon, Royal Engineers
- 2nd Lt. (Local) Herbert Charles Salter, Intelligence Corps
- 2nd Lt. Ernest Lambert Samuel, Honourable Arty. Company
- Tmp Lt. William Young-Sandeman, Royal Engineers
- Tmp Capt. William Roger Sangumetti, Royal Engineers
- Tmp Lt. Hugh le Gallienne Sarchet, Royal Berkshire Reg.
- 2nd Lt. John Bycroft Saul, Yorkshire Light Inf., attd. Machine Gun Corps
- Rev. Charles James Saunders, Royal Army Chaplains' Dept.
- Sgt. Major Arthur Albert Savage, Lancers
- Lt. Alfred Cecil Savill, Royal Field Arty.
- Capt. Henry Bourchier Wrey Savile, Middlesex Reg.
- Lt. Walter Savory, Royal Field Arty.
- Tmp Capt. Alfred Henry Sayer, Royal Warwickshire Reg.
- Tmp 2nd Lt. Herbert James Scales, General List and Royal Flying Corps
- Sgt. Major George Arthur Scarff, Scots Guards
- Q.M. and Hon. Lt. John James Schooling, Somerset Light Inf.
- Lt. Frank Arthur Sclater, Royal Engineers
- Tmp Lt. Adrian Gilbert Scott, Royal Engineers
- Capt. Alexander Scott, Argyll and Sutherland Highlanders
- Tmp 2nd Lt. Duncan Scott, Northumberland Fusiliers
- Tmp Lt. James Scott, Somerset Light Inf.
- Capt. James Bruce Scott, Punjabis, Indian Army
- Tmp Capt. Walter Henderson Scott, RAMC, attd. Durham Light Inf.
- Capt. William Fowler Fraser Scott, Royal Garrison Arty.
- Tmp Lt. William Walter Scott-Moncrieff, Royal Engineers
- Tmp Lt. Arthur Scragg, Army Service Corps
- Capt. Wilfred Arthur Seaman, Royal Engineers
- Capt. William Seaton, Nottinghamshire and Derbyshire Reg.
- Lt. Robert Edward Watson Semple, Royal Arty., attd. Trench Mortar Battery
- 2nd Lt. Harold Serginson, attd. Trench Mortar Battery
- Capt. Hugh Eric Seth Seth-Smith, Royal Irish Rifles Spec. Reserve
- Tmp Lt. Claud Ramsay Wilmot Seton, Motor Machine Gun Corps
- Lt. William Eric Lewis Seward, Royal Flying Corps Spec. Reserve
- Capt. John Arthur Gordon Shanks, Argyll and Sutherland Highlanders
- Capt. Francis Henry Shannons, Welsh Reg.
- Lt. Henry Shapcott, Royal Garrison Arty.
- 2nd Lt. Matthew Sharp, London Reg.
- Lt. Eric George Sharpe, Royal Field Arty.
- 2nd Lt. William Douglas Sharpington, Royal Garrison Arty.
- Tmp Capt. Henry Sharpies, Liverpool Reg.
- Tmp 2nd Lt. Ernest Shaw, Royal Engineers
- Tmp Lt. Frank Vincent Shaw, Royal Field Arty.
- Tmp Lt. George Thomas Shaw, General List
- Capt. Robert, Edward Frederic Shaw, London Reg.
- Q.M. and Hon. Capt. Joseph Patrick Lambert Shea, Durham Light Inf.
- Tmp Lt. William Frank Sheather, Machine Gun Corps
- Lt. Thomas Lilhco Shedden, Army Service Corps
- Tmp Capt. John Sheepshanks, Royal Garrison Arty.
- Tmp Capt. Herbert Sheffield, Army Service Corps
- Tmp 2nd Lt. Joseph Sheils, Lancashire Fusiliers
- Lt. Harry Neal Shelmerdine, Royal Field Arty.
- Tmp Capt. Allen Goodrich Shenstone, Royal Engineers
- Tmp Lt. Austin Kirk Shenton, Royal Engineers
- Capt. James Ogilvy Shepherd, Royal Field Arty.
- Tmp Lt. Richard Bellamy Sheppard, Welsh Reg.
- Tmp Lt. Gordon Shernff, Army Ordnance Depot
- Capt. Geoffrey William Sherston, Rifle Brigade
- Capt. Charles Frederick Shields, Leicestershire Reg.
- Tmp Sergeant Major James Shiels, Cameron Highlanders
- Lt. Herbert Shiner, Royal Garrison Arty.
- Tmp Capt. George Gordon Shone, Royal Field Arty.
- Lt. Frederick William Short, Royal Field Arty.
- 2nd Lt. Sidney Sparkling Moverley Sibold, Royal Field Arty.
- Lt. Frank Pitchford Silvers, South Staffordshire Reg.
- Lt. Archibald Guy Simmons, Honourable Arty. Company
- Tmp Capt. Leslie Hyland Simmons, Royal Field Arty.
- Lt. Charles Henville Simonds, Royal Engineers
- Tmp Capt. Alfred Simpkins, Royal Fusiliers
- C.S. Maj. Robert Henry Simpson, Army Service Corps
- Lt. Robert Kennedy Muir Simpson, Royal Field Arty.
- 2nd Lt. Robert Thorburn Simpson, Liverpool Reg.
- Tmp Capt. John Sinclair, Royal Engineers
- Capt. Oliver Sturdy Sinnatt, London Reg.
- Tmp Capt. Leslie Henderson Skene RAMC
- Lt. Arthur Birtlee Slack, 6th Battalion, Lancashire Fusiliers, attd. Trench Mortar Battery
- Capt. Francis George Lambart Sladen, Royal Engineers
- Tmp Capt. Francis Philip Slater, Royal Garrison Arty.
- Tmp Capt. Reginald Anderson Slater, Royal Irish Reg.
- Capt. Sydney Lawrence Slocock FRCVS Royal Army Veterinary Corps
- 2nd Lt. Johnson Ewart Smart, Manchester Reg.
- Capt. Alexander Smith, Royal Horse Arty.
- Capt. Allison Eugene Smith, Royal Arty.
- 2nd Lt. Arthur, Douglas Smith, Royal Field Arty.
- 2nd Lt. Albert Ernest Smith, Royal Garrison Arty.
- Tmp Capt. Allison Gould Smith, North Lancashire Reg.
- Capt. Arthur Macklow Smith, Royal Garrison Arty., attd. Royal Field Arty.
- Tmp Capt. Charles Sydney Smith, Machine Gun Corps
- Tmp Capt. Daniel Rowland Smith, Army Ordnance Depot
- Lt. Edward Archibald Smitt, Royal Engineers
- Tmp Lt. Edward Montague Smith, Royal Engineers
- Tmp Capt. Ewart William Smith, Army Service Corps
- Lt. Frank George Smith, Army Service Corps
- Lt. Frederick Smith, Royal Garrison Arty.
- Tmp Capt. Harold-Smith, West Yorkshire Reg.
- Capt. Harry Smith, West Riding Reg., attd. Machine Gun Corps
- 2nd Lt. James Lindsay Salmond Smith, Royal Garrison Arty.
- 2nd Lt. John Poole Smith, Royal Field Arty.
- Tmp Capt. Joseph Edward Geoffrey Smith, Somerset Light Inf.
- Capt. Richard Albert Bielchan Smith, Royal Engineers
- Tmp 2nd Lt. Rodenc Franklyn Smith, Shropshire Light Inf.
- Lt. Samuel-Haroild Smith, Cheshire Reg.
- Tmp Lt. Stephen Berthold Smith, Royal Flying Corps
- Tmp 2nd Lt. Stuart Arthur Smith, attd. Trench Mortar Battery
- Tmp Lt. Sydney Smith, Royal Engineers
- Lt. William George Smith, Field Company, Royal Engineers
- Sgt. Major William George Smith, Liverpool Reg.
- Tmp Capt. Arthur Ferguson Heyland Smyth, Royal Inniskilling Fusiliers
- Tmp Capt. Edmund Fitzgerald Smyth, Royal Irish Rifles
- Q.M. and Temp Honorary Lt. Samuel Snow, Durham Light Inf.
- Capt. Arthur Herbert Tennyson, Lord Somers, 1st Life Guards, attd. Yeomanry
- Lt. Austin Somervell, West Riding Reg.
- Tmp Lt. Alexander Henderson Souitar, Royal Engineers
- Tmp Capt. Compton Southgaite, Northumberland Fusiliers
- 2nd Lt. Frank Soward, Duke of Cornwall's Light Inf.
- Tmp Capt. Eric Bourne Bentnick Speed, Yorkshire Light Inf.
- Q.M. and Hon. Capt. Andrew Spence, Royal Scots Fusiliers
- Lt. Arthur Morphew Spence, Royal Horse Arty.
- Tmp Q.M. and Hon. Lt. Henry Spencer-Smith, Leicestershire Reg.
- Tmp Capt. Michael Spencer-Smith, General List (C. C. Heavy Arty.)
- Tmp Capt. Arthur Douglas Spooner, Supply Column, Army Service Corps
- Capt. Evelyn Charles Sprawson, RAMC
- 2nd Lt. George Moore Sproule, Army Service Corps
- Q.M. and Hon. Lt. James Chambers Sproule, Cheshire Reg.
- Tmp Lt. George Bertrand Spry, Royal Fusiliers
- Q.M. and Hon. Capt. Horace Owen Squire, Leinster Reg.
- Tmp Capt. Arthur Percy Havers Squires, Lincolnshire Reg., Comdg Trench Mortar Battery
- C.S. Maj. William Arthur Stace, Royal Sussex Reg.
- Capt. Cecil Spurling Staddon, RAMC
- Tmp Lt. Ralph Staley, Field Company, Royal Engineers
- Lt. Thomas Henry Gilborn Stamper, Royal Field Arty.
- Capt. Reginald Stanafocth, Nottinghamshire and Derbyshire Reg.
- Rev. George, Helliwell Crawford Stanley, Royal Army Chaplains' Dept.
- Lt. James Reginald Stanser, York & Lancaster Reg.
- Tmp Q.M. and Hon. Lt. William Samuel Herl Staple, King's Own Scottish Borderers
- Lt. Vincent Francis Stapleton-Bretherton, Field Company, Royal Engineers
- Q.M. and Hon. Lt. James Thomas Starkie, RAMC
- Capt. Thomas Henry Langdale Stebbing, Nottinghamshire and Derbyshire Reg.
- 2nd Lt. Gilbert Coleridge Stedham, Royal Engineers
- Lt. Henry Edwin Steer, Shropshire Light Inf.
- Capt. Derek Jarrett Steevens, Royal Field Arty.
- Lt. Charles Gerald Stephens, Oxfordshire & Buckinghamshire Light Inf., attd. Machine Gun Corps
- 2nd Lt. Kenneth Travers Stephen, Royal Field Arty.
- 2nd Lt. Robert Stephenson, Royal Inniskilling Fusiliers
- Capt. Frederick Claude Stern, Yeomanry
- Lt. Theodore Henry Stern, Royal Engineers
- Tmp Lt. Leo Stevem, Special List
- Tmp Capt. Leicester Bradney Stevens, Royal Arty.
- Tmp Capt. Hubert Craddock Stevenson, Royal Field Arty.
- Capt. John Hugh Macdonald Stevenson, Royal Arty., Mtn. Battery
- Tmp Lt. Michael Stevenson, Royal Engineers
- Tmp Capt. John Colin MacDougall Stewart, General List
- Tmp Capt. John Hazelton Stewart, Royal Irish Rifles
- Tmp 2nd Lt. Robert Montgomery Stewart, King's Own Scottish Borderers and Machine Gun Corps
- Capt. Walter Francis Stirling, late Royal Dublin Fusiliers
- Capt. Tom Thornley MacGillicuddy Stoker, Royal Munster Fusiliers
- Tmp Capt. William Alfred Collis Stone, Royal Field Arty.
- Capt. Gerald Johnston Lipyeatt Stoney, Worcestershire Reg.
- Capt. Charles Ronald Stott, York & Lancaster Reg., attd. Royal Engineers
- Lt. William Stott, East Lancashire Reg.
- Tmp Lt. Bernard Lewis Strauss, East Kent Reg.
- Capt. Cecil John Charles Street, Royal Garrison Arty.
- Tmp Capt. Charles Norman Lockhart Stronge, Royal Inniskilling Fusiliers
- Capt. Humphrey Cecil Travell Stronge, East Kent Reg., and Nigeria Reg.
- 2nd Lt. Lewis Robert Stubbs, Royal Garrison Arty.
- 2nd Lt. Philip Lange Sugden, Royal Garrison Arty.
- Tmp Capt. Frederick Summers, Royal Engineers
- Capt. Albert James Sutcliffe, Cheshire Reg.
- Lt. James Lawrence Cathcart Sutherland, Royal West Kent Reg.
- Capt. Francis Henry Sutton, Hussars
- 2nd Lt. Jack Cyril Sutton, Manchester Reg.
- C.S. Maj. William Swam, Royal Engineers
- Capt. James Swan RAMC
- Tmp Lt. Sydney Bartlett Swan, Gloucestershire Reg.
- Tmp Lt. Alfred Bertram Swann, Middlesex Reg.
- Capt. Alan Cawley Swindells, Royal Field Arty.
- Capt. William Swinton, Royal Field Arty.
- Tmp Lt. Stanley William Sykes, Intelligence Corps
- Tmp Lt. William Smith Syme, Cheshire Reg.
- Tmp Capt. Henry John Hugh Symons, RAMC
- 2nd Lt. Edward Noel Callis Symonds, Royal Field Arty.
- Capt. Henry Gordon Tabuteau-Herrick, Royal Army Veterinary Corps
- Tmp 2nd Lt. Gerald Richard Tadman, Spec List
- Lt. Osborne George Tancock, Royal Field Arty.
- Capt. Harold Astley Tapp, Army Service Corps
- Tmp Capt. Percy John Rutty Tapp, Divisional Train, Army Service Corps
- Lt. Sydney Ernest Tarrant, Royal Field Arty., attd. Survey C, Royal Engineers
- Capt. Geoffrey Bulmer Tatham, Rifle Brigade
- Lt. Norman Leuchars Tatham, Royal Field Arty.
- Tmp Capt. Charles MacGregor Taylor, Royal Field Arty.
- Capt. Edward Mallalieu Brooke Taylor, Nottinghamshire and Derbyshire Reg.
- Tmp Lt. Edward Roland Taylor, Royal Engineers
- Tmp 2nd Lt. Ewart John Taylor, Gloucestershire Reg., attd. Welsh Reg.
- Tmp Q.M. and Hon. Lt. Frank Taylor, Lincolnshire Reg.
- Lt. Frederick John Taylor, Royal Field Arty.
- Tmp Lt. George Osborne Taylor, General List, attd. Signal Company, Royal Engineers
- Tmp Capt. George Vere Taylor, Rifles Brigade
- Capt. Harold Meadows Taylor, Norfolk Reg. and Machine Gun Corps
- Q.M.S. James Taylor, Durham Light Inf.
- Tmp Capt. Henry Augustus Taylor, Royal Fusiliers
- Capt. Kenneth Baring Taylor, Royal Welsh Fusiliers
- Lt. Norman Taylor, Royal Engineers
- 2nd Lt. Wilfrid Adams Teakle, Essex Reg., attd. Rifle Brigade
- Tmp Capt. Charles Hugh Tebay, Royal Field Arty.
- Capt. Claude Enc Tebbitt, Signal Company, Royal Engineers
- Capt. Eustace Ernest Vazeille Temperley, Royal Engineers
- Lt. Bertram Temple, Gloucestershire Reg.
- Tmp Lt. Alfred Alan Thackery, West Yorkshire Reg., attd. Essex Reg.
- Capt. Reginald Sparshatt Thatcher, Somerset Light Inf.
- Sgt. Major William Thomas Theobald, Bedfordshire Reg.
- 2nd Lt. Henry Thirkill, Royal Engineers, attd. Signal Service
- Tmp Capt. Kenneth Alfred Thirsk, East Yorkshire Reg.
- Tmp Lt. George Thorn, Nyasaland Field Force
- Tmp Capt. Basil Walter Thomas, Graves Registration Unit
- Tmp Lt. John Henry Thomas, Special List
- Lt. William Humphrey Thomas, Yeomanry
- Capt. Herbert Stanley Thompson, Royal Garrison Arty.
- 2nd Lt. James Thompson, Siege Battery, Royal Garrison Arty.
- Tmp 2nd Lt. John Bell Langhorn Thompson, Road Construction Company, Royal Engineers
- C.S. Maj. John Thomas Thompson, Northumberland Fusiliers
- Lt. Leslie Frank Thompson, Royal Field Arty.
- Tmp Lt. William Harding Thompson, Royal Field Arty.
- C.S. Maj. Alex Downie Thomson, Royal Scots
- Capt. Edmund John Thomson, Siege Bty, Royal Garrison Arty.
- Lt. James Smith Thomson, Royal Scots
- Lt. Robert Thorburn, Indian Army Reserve of Ofc.s, attd. Light Inf.
- Lt. Stephen Keith Thorburn, Royal Field Arty.
- Tmp Capt. Frank Oswald Thome, Manchester Reg.
- Lt. Philip Howard Thome, Royal Engineers
- Tmp Capt. Leslie Thorns, General List
- Tmp Capt. Bernard Martin Thornton, Army Ordnance Depot
- Tmp Capt. George Lostock Thornton, RAMC
- Q.M.S. Samuel West Thornton, Royal Irish Rifles
- Capt. William Henry Jelf Thornton, Royal Arty.
- 2nd Lt. Francis John Mytton Thornycrolt, Manchester Reg.
- Tmp Capt. Bertram Leland Thorp, Army Service Corps, and Tank Corps
- 2nd Lt. George Fleetwood Thunlier, Devonshire Reg.
- 2nd Lt. Charles Ernest Thurston, Royal Scots 2nd Lt. William Evan Tibbs, Royal Arty.
- Q.M. and Hon. Capt. Thomas John Tilbrook, RAMC
- Capt. John Arthur Stuart Tillard, Royal Engineers
- Capt. Justice Crosland Tilly, West Yorkshire Reg., attd. Tank Corps
- 2nd Lt. Leonard Arthur Tilney, Royal Horse Guards, and Royal Flying Corps
- Tmp Capt. Robert Tindall RAMC
- Lt. George Evelyn Tiriling, East Lancashire Reg.
- Rev. George Wolfe Robert Tobias, Royal Army Chaplains' Dept.
- 2nd Lt. Herbert Stanley Todd, East Surrey Reg.
- Capt. Richard Tomlinson, Army Service Corps
- Tmp Lt. Thomas Fowler Tomlinson, Royal Engineers
- Lt. Joseph Walter Tompkins, Royal Garrison Arty.
- Tmp Lt. Maynard Tomson, Divisional Signal Company, Royal Engineers
- Lt. Kenneth Sanderson Torrance, Manchester Reg.
- Tmp Capt. William Frederick Topley, Labour Corps
- Lt. Arthur Totton, London Reg.
- Tmp Capt. Robert Wilfrid Townsend, Devonshire Reg.
- Lt. Cecil Edward Joseph Trafford, Scots Guards
- Tmp Lt. Gilbert Barsham Traill, Royal Field Arty.
- Capt. William Augustus Trasenster, Royal Fusiliers
- Capt. Tom Stockham Travere, London Reg.
- 2nd Lt. Francis Joseph Traylen, Rifle Brigade
- 2nd Lt. Harry Walter Tredmnick, Yeomanry
- 2nd Lt. Mansel James Tregurtha, London Reg., attd. Machine Gun Corps
- Tmp Capt. Rudolph Montague Tren, Army Service Corps
- Tmp Lt. Henry Prentis Trend, Connaught Rangers
- Capt. Leslie Hamilton Trist, Lincolnshire Reg., attd. East Lancashire Reg.
- Tmp 2nd Lt. Alick Dunbar Trotter, South Lancashire Reg.
- Lt. Harry William Troupe, Royal Horse Arty., attd. Royal Field Arty.
- Tmp Capt. Everard Hugh Trousdale, Army Service Corps
- Capt. Alexander James Trousdell, Royal Irish Fusiliers
- Lt. Arthur Malcolm Gillett Trotter, Royal Field Arty.
- Tmp Capt. Joseph Ernest Troughton, West Riding Reg.
- Tmp 2nd Lt. Robert William Trump, Spec Company, Royal Engineers
- Capt. George Arthur Tryon, King's Royal Rifle Corps
- Tmp Capt. Spencer Tryon, King's African Rifles
- Tmp Capt. James Somerville Turcau, Seaforth Highlanders
- Capt. Alan Leonard Smith Tuke RAMC
- Tmp Capt. Oswald Graham Noel Turnbull, Army Service Corps
- Tmp Lt. Arthur Robert Turner, East African Pioneer Company
- Tmp Lt. Clifford Grosvenor Turner, Royal Engineers
- Tmp Lt. Henry Elliot Turner, Signal Company, Royal Engineers
- C.S. Maj. Henry Michael Turner, London Reg.
- Lt. Maurice Finnemore Turner, Monmouthshire Reg.
- Capt. Montagu Trevor Turner, Royal Sussex Reg.
- Lt. Oswald Morris Turner, Royal Field Arty.
- Tmp Lt. Roland Turner, York & Lancaster Reg.
- Lt. William Maitland Turner, Northumberland Fusiliers
- Tmp Lt. James Wmford Turrell, Royal Naval Volunteer Reserve
- 2nd Lt. Fiank Percival Twine, Royal Sussex Reg.
- Capt. The Hon. Ivo Murray Twisleton-Wykeham-Fiennes, Royal Field Arty.
- Capt. Dudley Cyril Twiss, South Staffordshire Reg.
- 2nd Lt. Harold William Tyler, Royal Engineers
- Rev. Edward Denis Tyndall, Royal Army Chaplains' Dept.
- Tmp Lt. John Altabon Guise Tyndale, Railway Company, Royal Engineers
- Capt. Guy Yelverton Tyrrell, East Kent Reg.
- Tmp 2nd Lt. Roland King Uhthoff, Royal Engineers
- Tmp 2nd Lt. Alfred Edwin Underhay, Royal West Surrey Reg.
- Capt. Ian Ure, Argyll and Sutherland Highlanders
- Lt. Harry Usher, Royal Scots, attd. Machine Gun Corps
- Lt. William Vance, Royal Irish Fusiliers
- Capt. Edward Charles Louis van Cutsem, Shropshire Light Inf.
- Capt. Stephen Hugh Van Neck, London Reg.
- Lt. William John Varley, Royal Field Arty.
- Capt. Bernard Varvill, RAMC
- Tmp Capt. Michael Noel Varvill, Royal Engineers, attd. Railway Corps (Prot)
- Capt. Charles Hardy Vaughan, Army Service Corps
- Lt. Edward Harold Vaughan, Yeomanry
- Capt. Edmund Wayne Vaughan RAMC
- Tmp Capt. Thomas Hubert Veasey, General List
- Capt. Ernest Hardinge Veitch, Durham Light Inf.
- Tmp Capt. Robert Vernet, General List
- Tmp R.S. Maj. Henry Vincent, Oxfordshire & Buckinghamshire Light Inf.
- Lt. Louis Henry Xavier Vintcent, Royal Garrison Arty.
- Lt. Thomas. Aubrey Vise, Royal Garrison Arty.
- Capt. Enc William Noel Wade, Hampshire Reg.
- Capt. George Albert Wade, South Staffordshire Reg., attd. MGC
- Capt. Richard Harry Wagner, London Reg., attd. Royal Engineers
- Tmp Capt. Thomas Hinde Wake, Northumberland Fusiliers
- Capt. Kenrick Prescot Walker, York & Lancaster Reg.
- Tmp Lt. Knuts Waldenstrom, Intelligence Corps
- Rev. Samuel Charles Waldegrave, Royal Army Chaplains' Dept.
- Tmp Lt. Frank Raphael Waley, General List, and Trench Mortar Battery
- Tmp Capt. Arthur Francis Gregory Walker, General List
- Tmp Lt. Alexander Izat Walker, Divisional Signal Company, Royal Engineers
- Tmp Lt. Edwin Harvey Walker, Royal Field Arty.
- Capt. Joseph Walker RAMC
- Tmp 2nd Lt. John Willis Walker, Tunnlg Company, Royal Engineers
- Lt. Thornton Howard Walker, Royal Field Arty., Ammunition Column
- Capt. Ulnc William Ferrier Walker, Royal Army Veterinary Corps
- C.S. Maj. John Wall, Grenadier Guards, attd. Honourable Arty. Company
- Tmp Capt. Edward Chapman Wallace, RAMC
- Lt. Frederic Campbell Wallace, Royal Irish Rifles, Spec. Reserve
- Tmp Lt. John Wallace, Divisional Signals Company, Royal Engineers
- Lt. Gerald Edward Henry Waller, Siege Company (R Mon.), Royal Engineers
- Capt. Ernest Walling, West Yorkshire Reg.
- Lt. Frederick Morfee Walsh, Royal Field Arty.
- Capt. Ernest John Walthew, Field Company, Royal Engineers
- Capt. Frederick Walton, Durham Light Inf.
- Capt. Percy Walton, Gordon Highlanders
- Lt. Allan Edgar Wand, Leicestershire Reg.
- Lt. Alsager Warburton, Liverpool Reg.
- Tmp Lt. Charles Wilson Ward, Royal Garrison Arty.
- Capt. Joseph Hugh Ward RAMC
- Capt. John Percival Ward, Field Company, Royal Engineers
- Tmp 2nd Lt. Orlando Frank Montague Ward, Royal Arty.
- Q.M. and Hon. Capt. Herbert Ernest Balfern Ware, RAMC
- R.S. Maj. William Francis Warren, Royal West Kent Reg.
- Tmp 2nd Lt. John Charles Warren, Welsh Reg.
- Lt. Douglas Charles Warwick, North Staffordshire Reg., attd. Machine Gun Corps
- Tmp Capt. Hugh Fleming Warwick RAMC
- Capt. Cyril Walter Carleton Wasey, Royal Warwickshire Reg., attd. Royal Flying Corps
- C.S. Maj. Harold George Waters, Yorkshire Light Inf.
- Tmp Lt. Charles Tyrrell Watkins, Army Ordnance Depot
- Tmp Capt. Gwilym David Watkins DSO RAMC
- Tmp 2nd Lt. James William Watkins, Lancashire Fusiliers
- Hon. Capt. Stephen Watling, Army Ordnance Depot
- Capt. Edward Watson, Highland Light Inf.
- Tmp Capt. Aubrey Wentworth Harrison Watson, King's Royal Rifle Corps
- R.S. Maj. Joseph Watson, Durham Light Inf.
- Tmp Capt. James Watson, Army Service Corps
- Tmp Capt. John Dalglish Watson, RAMC
- 2nd Lt. Kenneth Charles Forrester Watson, South Lancashire Reg., attd. Royal Warwickshire Reg.
- Tmp Capt. Stanley Watson, Cheshire Reg.
- Lt. Thomas William Watson, Royal Field Arty.
- Tmp Capt. William Barrie Watson RAMC
- 2nd Lt. Hugo Burr Craig Watt, Durham Light Inf.
- Capt. James Cairnes Watt, East African Medical Service, attd. King's African Rifles
- Tmp Capt. Reginald Cuthbert Watts, Royal Warwickshire Reg.
- Lt. Thomas George Watt, Royal Field Arty.
- Tmp 2nd Lt. Hedley George Watts, attd. Liverpool Reg.
- Tmp 2nd Lt. Thomas Nathaniel Watts-Watts, Oxfordshire & Buckinghamshire Light Inf.
- Capt. Herbert Waylen, Wiltshire Reg.
- 2nd Lt. Henry Buckland Weatherdon, Royal Field Arty., attd. Labour Corps
- Tmp 2nd Lt. Oliver Stanley Webb, Signal Company, Royal Engineers
- Capt. Stuart Napier Charles Webb, South Wales Borderers and Nigeria Reg.
- C.S. Maj. William Webb, 2nd Battalion, Suffolk Reg., attd. Royal Welsh Fusiliers
- Tmp Lt. Geoffrey John Websdale, Signal Company, Royal Engineers
- Capt. William Joseph Webster RAMC
- Tmp Capt. Llewellyn McIntyre Weeks, RAMC
- 2nd Lt. Wilfrid Clement Septimus Weighill, West Yorkshire Reg.
- Capt. George Gordon Weir, Royal Scots
- Rev. Frederick William Welbon, Royal Army Chaplains' Dept.
- Tmp Capt. Lewis Barrington Weldon, Special List
- Q.M. and Hon. Lt. Allan Welch, West Yorkshire Reg.
- 2nd Lt. Thomas Ridley Welch, Durham Light Inf.
- Tmp Lt. Charles Douglas Wells, Royal Lancaster Reg.
- Tmp Lt. Cecil Frank Wells, Royal Fusiliers
- Rev. Edward John Welsher, Royal Army Chaplains' Dept.
- Tmp Capt. Archibald Stewart West, Royal Field Arty.
- Lt. Harry Gordon West, Liverpool Reg.
- Lt. Louis John Westbury, Royal Field Arty.
- Lt. Robert Burns Wharrie, Highland Light Inf., attd. Machine Gun Corps
- Lt. Walter Roland Tracey Whatmore, Royal Warwickshire Reg.
- Capt. Alexander Hamilton Wheeler, West Somerset Yeomanry
- Capt. John Bickersteth Wheeler, Hussars, attd. Signal Service
- Tmp Capt. Bertrand Percy Whillis, Northumberland Fusiliers
- Tmp Capt. Everard White, Royal Engineers
- Tmp Lt. Frank Buller Howard White, Royal Engineers
- Tmp Capt. Bernard Burke White, Durham Light Inf.
- Tmp Capt. George Plunkett White RAMC
- C.S. Maj. Percy White, Royal Sussex Reg.
- Tmp 2nd Lt. Sidney John White, Spec. Company, Royal Engineers
- Tmp Capt. William Robert White, Royal Irish Rifles
- Lt. Edward George Lang Whiteaway, Yorkshire Light Inf., attd. West Yorkshire Reg.
- Lt. Gerald Herbert Penn Whitfield, Royal Irish Rifles
- Lt. Philip Geoffrey Whitefoord, Royal Arty.
- Lt. Reginald. Henry Hughes Whitehead, Royal Horse Arty.
- Lt. Reginald Willoughby Whitehead, Royal Field Arty.
- Capt. Augustin George Richard Whitehouse, Herefordshire Reg.
- Lt. John Francis Martin Whiteley, Royal Engineers
- Tmp Capt. Edward Victor Whiteway, East Surrey Reg.
- Capt. Ernest James Whiteon, Highland Light Inf.
- Lt. Francis Robert Whitten, Field Company, Royal Engineers
- 2nd Lt. Percy Henry Roy Whittet, Royal Flying Corps
- Lt. Arthur William Whittingham, Royal Field Arty.
- Lt. Mark Whitwill, Royal Engineers
- Capt. Gerald Eden Mynors Whittuck, Somerset Light Inf.
- Tmp Capt. Percy Whyatt, Nottinghamshire and Derbyshire Reg.
- Capt. Robert Whyte, London Reg.
- Lt. Charles Foster Wicks, Royal Field Arty.
- Lt. Frederick James Wicks, Royal Garrison Arty., attd. Army Ordnance Depot
- Lt. John Henry Becher Wigginton, Army Service Corps
- Capt. Henry Rowe Wight, Border Reg., attd. Royal Engineers
- Lt. Arthur Bennett Wightman, Manchester Reg.
- Capt. Lionel St. George Wilkinson, Manchester Reg.
- Tmp Capt. William Dugdale Wilkinson, Royal Field Arty.
- Lt. Basil Henry Williams, Hussars
- 2nd Lt. Cuthbert Gray Williams, Royal Field Arty.
- 2nd Lt. Edmund Charles Williams, Royal Munster Fusiliers
- Tmp Lt. Frank Harry Williams, Road Cons Company, Royal Engineers
- Q.M. and Hon. Lt. George John Williams, Royal Warwickshire Reg.
- Tmp Capt. Hugh Patrick Williams, Army Service Corps
- Tmp Lt. Leslie Hamlyn Williams, Army Ordnance Depot
- 2nd Lt. Nigel Oldham Williams, London Reg., attd. Kings Royal Rifle Corps
- 2nd Lt. Richard Williams, Royal Garrison Arty.
- Tmp Lt. Robert Arthur Williams, Army Troops, Royal Engineers
- Tmp 2nd Lt. Sedley Gerald Williams, General List, Devonshire Reg., attd. Trench Mortar Battery
- Rev. Thomas John Williams, Royal Army Chaplains' Dept.
- Lt. William Henry Williams, Army Service Corps
- Rev. William James Williams, Royal Army Chaplains' Dept.
- Lt. Bertram Clough Williams-Ellis, Welsh Guards, attd. Tank Corps
- Capt. Hudleston Noel Hedworth Williamson, Royal Field Arty.
- Lt. John Williamson, Royal Field Arty.
- Lt. Alfred Gordon Wills, Cambridgeshire Reg., attd. Machine Gun Corps
- 2nd Lt. Frederick Arthur Neville Wilmott, Royal Berkshire Reg.
- Tmp Lt. Stanley Birley Wilmot, Royal Engineers
- 2nd Lt. Arthur Wilson, Leinster Reg., attd. Machine Gun Corps
- Tmp Capt. Alan Wilson RAMC
- Capt. Alexander Frazer Wilson RAMC
- Lt. George Henry Wilson, Royal Field Arty.
- Tmp 2nd Lt. George Ronald Wilson, Machine Gun Corps
- Lt. Herbert Wilson, Royal Garrison Arty.
- Capt. William Fothergill Wilson RAMC
- Lt. Roy Ansted Winder, Middlesex Reg. and Tank Corps
- R.S. Maj. Thomas Winderam, Scottish Rifles
- Capt. William Palmer Wilton, London Reg.
- 2nd Lt. William Wilberforce Winkworth, Royal Field Arty.
- Sgt. Major John Winmill, Rifle Brigade
- Lt. William Meggitt Winter, Royal Garrison Arty.
- Lt. James Percival Winterbotham, Gloucestershire Reg.
- Lt. Cuthbert Walter Wise, Army Service Corps and Royal Flying Corps
- Lt. George Leslie Keith Wisely, Royal Field Arty.
- Tmp Capt. Charles Watts RAMC
- 2nd Lt. Arthur Charles Wood, Royal Garrison Arty.
- Capt. Arderne Relf Wood, Yeomanry
- Tmp Lt. Charles Constable Wood, Royal Irish Rifles
- Capt. Frank Wood, Lancashire Fusiliers
- 2nd Lt. Kenneth Berridge Wood, Leicestershire Reg., attd. Machine Gun Corps
- Capt. William Vincent Wood, RAMC
- Lt. Cyril Frank Woodbridge Royal Field Arty.
- 2nd Lt. Bond Wilby Woodhouse, Royal Engineers
- C.S. Maj. Horace Dawson Woods, Bedfordshire Reg.
- Tmp Lt. Charles Campbell Woolley, South Wales Borderers
- Capt. John Sims Woolley, Royal Garrison Arty.
- Lt. William Woolliscroft, Royal Field Arty., attd. Trench Mortar Battery
- Tmp 2nd Lt. John Norman Wootton, attd. Trench Mortar Battery
- Lt. Leslie Graham Wormald, Royal Field Arty.
- Capt. William Parker Wrathall, Royal Highlanders
- Tmp Capt. Clifton Wright, Signal Company, Royal Engineers
- Lt. Charles Seymour Wright, Royal Engineers, Signal Company
- Capt. Egerton Lowndes Wright, Oxfordshire & Buckinghamshire Light Inf.
- C.S. Maj. Harry Joseph Wright, Scots Guards, attd. London Reg.
- Tmp Capt. Herbert William Wright, Field Company, Royal Engineers
- 2nd Lt. Percy Frederic Wright, London Reg.
- Tmp Capt. Peter Wright, Royal Field Arty.
- Tmp Lt. Wilfred Wright, Machine Gun Corps
- Capt. Harold Anthony Saxton Wurtele, Royal Field Arty.
- Tmp Capt. Richard John Penfold Wyatt, General List
- Lt. and Temp Capt. David Courtney Wybrants, Army Service Corps Divisional Supply Column
- Capt. Charles Edward Fowler Wynooll, Royal Engineers
- Lt. Guy Richard Charles Wyndham, King's Royal Rifle Corps
- Tmp Lt. Robert Mainwaring Wynne-Eyton, General List and Royal Flying Corps
- Lt. Henry George Yates, Royal Field Arty.
- 2nd Lt. James Yates, Northumberland Fusiliers
- 2nd Lt. Alec Dawson Young, West Yorkshire Reg.
- Lt. James Young, Royal Scots
- 2nd Lt. Leslie Abraham, Yeomanry
- 2nd Lt. Johnson Morris Affleck, Northumberland Fusiliers
- Tmp Lt. Ian Woodford Aitken, Dragoon Guards
- Lt. John Aldam Aizlewood, Dragoon Guards
- Lt. William Poyntz Alcock, Hussars
- Tmp 2nd Lt. Christopher Rowland Aldereon, Royal Engineers
- Sub-Major Amar Sing Thapa, Sardar Bahadur, Indian Army
- Capt. William Herbert Wynne Apperley, Royal Sussex Reg.
- Tmp Lt. Richard Montgomery Archdale, Hussars
- Tmp Lt. Albert Herbert Howard Armstrong, Royal Inniskilling Fusiliers
- 2nd Lt. Arnold Bright Ashford, London Reg.
- Lt. Edward Gordon Audland, Royal Field Arty.
- 2nd Lt. Alfred Ernest Bagnall, York & Lancaster Reg.
- Capt. The Hon. George Evan Michael Baillie, Royal Horse Arty.
- Capt. Sidney Charles Ball, Royal Lancaster Reg.
- Rev. Humphrey Gordon Barclay, Royal Army Chaplains' Dept.
- Tmp Lt. Warren Barclay, Royal Naval Volunteer Reserve
- 2nd Lt. David Crawford Gordon Bardsley, South Staffordshire Reg.
- Tmp 2nd Lt. Wilfred Pease Barker, West Yorkshire Reg., attd. Machine Gun Corps
- Lt. Roland Todd Barnard, Dragoon Guards
- Tmp Sub Lt. John Cyril Bartholomew, Royal Naval Volunteer Reserve
- Lt. Herbert Ralph Barton, Hussars
- Lt. Bernard Paul Gascoigne Beanlands, Hampshire Reg., and Royal Flying Corps
- 2nd Lt. James Richardson Beckett, North Lancashire Reg.
- Lt. Eric Lowthian Bell, Northumberland Fusiliers
- 2nd Lt. Richard Bell, Border Reg.
- Capt. Augustus Charles Herbert Benke, London Reg.
- Tmp 2nd Lt. Richard Reed Bentley, General List and Royal Flying Corps
- 2nd Lt. Robert Humphrey Binney, Essex Reg. Spec. Reserve
- Lt. Duncan Blackwell, London Reg.
- 2nd Lt. Henry Claude Allan Blanchard, London Reg.
- 2nd Lt. David Blair, Royal Field Arty.
- Tmp 2nd Lt. Stanley George Blake, Gloucestershire Reg., attd. Devonshire Reg.
- Lt. Cecil Francis Ramsden Bland, Royal Berkshire Reg.
- Tmp 2nd Lt. Reginald Percy Bloor, Royal Field Arty., attd. Trench Mortar Battery
- Lt. Douglas Maryon Bluett, Honourable Arty. Company
- Tmp 2nd Lt. Sidney. Blyth, Royal Scots
- 2nd Lt. Edward Henry Brooke Boulton, Royal Field Arty.
- 2nd Lt. Herbert Booth, London Reg.
- 2nd Lt. James Duncan Boyd, Royal Field Arty.
- Lt. William Boyd, Royal Field Arty., attd. Royal Engineers
- Capt. Allen Basil Bratton, North Lancashire Reg.
- Tmp Sub Lt. Joe Willis Brearley, Royal Naval Volunteer Reserve
- Capt. George AlbertBrett, London Reg.
- Lt. Francis James Bridges, Hussars, attd. Machine Gun Corps
- Tmp Capt. John Frederick Broughton RAMC
- Lt. Bernard Loftus Brown, Royal Garrison Arty.
- Lt. John Bruce, Royal Engineers
- Tmp Lt. Harry Buckley, Manchester Reg.
- Capt. George Talbot Burney, Gordon Highlanders
- 2nd Lt. John Alexander Burton, Northumberland Fusiliers
- 2nd Lt. Leslie Frederick Burton, South Staffordshire Reg.
- Tmp 2nd Lt. Alfred Trego Butler, Worcestershire Reg.
- 2nd Lt. Arnold Hewitt Butterworth, Welsh Reg.
- Tmp Capt. Hugh Vyvian Edward Byrne, Norfolk Reg.
- 2nd Lt. John Stewart Calder, London Reg.
- Capt. Angus Cameron RAMC
- Lt. John Archibald Cameron, Yeomanry, attd. Cameron Highlanders
- Tmp Lt. William Kealty Campbell DSO RAMC
- Tmp Lt. Percy Theodore Carden, General List, and Royal Flying Corps
- 2nd Lt. George Thomas Carpenter, Royal Engineers
- 2nd Lt. John William Carr, London Reg.
- Lt. Arthur Hamilton Carter, Royal Lancaster Reg.
- Tmp 2nd Lt. George Sidney Carter, East Surrey Reg.
- Capt. Charles Denny Carus-Wilson, Yeomanry
- 2nd Lt. Roger Philip Castle, Royal Garrison Arty.
- 2nd Lt. Bernard Catling, Royal Field Arty. Spec. Reserve
- Tmp Capt. Charles Launder Chalk, RAMC
- Lt. Reginald M. Charley, Royal Flying Corps
- Tmp 2nd Lt. John Harold Smith Christian, Royal Engineers
- Lt. Cyril William Clarke, Liverpool Reg.
- 2nd Lt. Frederick Laurence Clarke, London Reg.
- Tmp 2nd Lt. Geoffrey Read Garnett Clarke, Royal Field Arty.
- Tmp Sub Lt. William Herbert Clarkson, Royal Naval Volunteer Reserve
- Lt. John Scott Cockburn, Hussars
- Tmp 2nd Lt. Arthur Hubert Cole, Royal Sussex Reg.
- Capt. William Philip Coifox, Royal Field Arty.
- Lt. Philip Hugh Lumsdeh Campbell Colquhoun, Royal Highlanders
- Lt. Herbert Chichester Cory, Royal Field Arty.
- 2nd Lt. Arthur Gilmour Cowling, Royal Garrison Arty.
- Tmp 2nd Lt. Charles Richard Cowper, East Surrey Reg.
- Tmp Lt. Robert Frank Craighead, Army Ordnance Depot
- Capt. William Nixon Craigs, Northumberland Fusiliers
- Capt. Joseph Wilfrid Craven, RAMC
- Tmp 2nd Lt. Thomas Edward Chapman Crosbie, Royal Irish Fusiliers
- Capt. Cyril Crossley, Royal Field Arty.
- Tmp Capt. Octavious Sydney Darby-Griffiths, North Lancashire Reg.
- Tmp Lt. Howard Howells Davenport, South Wales Borderers
- Tmp 2nd Lt. Charles Davidson, Royal Engineers
- Tmp 2nd Lt. Douglas Card Davis, Machine Gun Corps
- Tmp 2nd Lt. Frederick Albert Dawson, East Surrey Reg.
- Lt. Bernard Lorenzo de Robeck, Royal Field Arty.
- 2nd Lt. Charles Vogan Dipnall, Royal Field Arty.
- 2nd Lt. Myles Dixon, Royal Engineers
- 2nd Lt. Charles Alban William Duffield, Royal West Kent Reg.
- Tmp Capt. Henzell Howard Dummere, RAMC
- 2nd Lt. Hubert William Durlacher, London Reg.
- Capt. Frederick Norman Eastwood, London Reg.
- Tmp 2nd Lt. Leslie Edwards, Middlesex Reg., attd. North Lancashire Reg.
- 2nd Lt. Herbert Pearce Ellis, Yeomanry
- Tmp Sub Lt. Edgar Archibald Elson, Royal Naval Volunteer Reserve
- Tmp 2nd Lt. Leonard Llewellyn Evans, attd. Devonshire Reg.
- 2nd Lt. Allan Cameron Fairbrother, Nottinghamshire and Derbyshire Reg.
- Tmp Sub-Lt. Kenneth Ian Macdonald Fegan, Royal Naval Volunteer Reserve
- 2nd Lt. Cecil Gordon Fenton, Royal Flying Corps
- Capt. Stuart Frederick Maxwell Ferguson, Royal Field Arty.
- Tmp Capt. James Edward McCormick Fetherstonhaugh, Royal Field Arty.
- Capt. George de Cardonne Elmsall Findlay, Royal Engineers
- Tmp 2nd Lt. William Fitzgerald, Machine Gun Corps
- 2nd Lt. John Hinton Fletcher, Royal Engineers
- Lt. Thomas Forster, Royal Engineers
- Capt. Archibald Francis Freeman, Yeomanry, attd. Royal Welsh Fusiliers
- 2nd Lt. Frederick Walter Fry, Worcestershire Reg.
- Lt. Joseph Charles Gain, London Reg.
- Lt. Wilfred Errol Gane, Royal Field Arty.
- 2nd Lt. Noel Garnett-Clarke, Royal Garrison Arty.
- Tmp Capt. Edward John Langford Garstin, Middlesex Reg.
- 2nd Lt. Lionel Ghasemore Gates, London Reg.
- Tmp 2nd Lt. George Pindon Geen, Royal Engineers
- Lt. Harry Taylor Genet, Royal Engineers
- Tmp Lt. Terence Genney, Royal Field Arty.
- Tmp Capt. Frederick Charles Gillard, Royal Army Veterinary Corps
- Tmp Lt. Geoffrey Ramsay Goldinghain, Royal Marine Light Inf., attd. Machine Gun Corps
- 2nd Lt. Edward Guy Medlicott Goodwin, Royal Garrison Arty.
- 2nd Lt. Frank Fleming Gow, Royal Field Arty.
- 2nd Lt. Percy Grange, Royal Field Arty.
- 2nd Lt. Robert Johnson Grant, Durham Light Inf.
- 2nd Lt. James Gray, Cameron Highlanders, attd. Royal Highlanders
- Capt. Douglas Green, West Yorkshire Reg.
- Tmp Lt. Ernest Arthur Gregory, Leicestershire Reg.
- 2nd Lt. John Vescy Gregory, Northumberland Fusiliers
- Lt. Charles Lawrence Greig, Royal Field Arty.
- 2nd Lt. David George Griffiths, Royal Field Arty.
- 2nd Lt. Benjamin Ernest Gunns, Royal Field Arty.
- Tmp 2nd Lt. Walter Pank Hack, Lincolnshire Reg.
- Lt. Walter Churchill Hale, Royal Field Arty.
- Hon. Lt. Johann Daniel Hamman, Intelligence Dept.
- 2nd Lt. Henry Hammond, Dorsetshire Reg. and Royal Flying Corps
- Rev. Latimer Pollard Hardaker, Royal Army Chaplains' Dept.
- Lt. William Birrell Hardie, Royal Field Arty.
- Rev. Wilfrid John Harding, Royal Army Chaplains' Dept.
- Lt. Reginald Bargreaves, South Lancashire Reg.
- 2nd Lt. Reginald Kirman Harper, Northumberland Fusiliers
- Tmp Lt. Frank Eric Harrison, Royal Field Arty.
- Tmp Lt. Alexander Ashworth Haworth, Royal Field Arty.
- Tmp 2nd Lt. Frank Beckett Hayes, Machine Gun Corps
- Lt. Cyril George Hein, Loyal North Lancashire Reg.
- Lt. Harald Hewett, Royal Berkshire Reg. and Royal Flying Corps
- 2nd Lt. Norman Dudley John Hight, Essex Reg.
- 2nd Lt. Frederick William Pear Hodges, East Lancashire Reg.
- Tmp Capt. Eric O'Neil Hogben, Army Cyclist Corps
- Lt. Frank Haddon Holmes, Royal Engineers, and Royal Flying Corps
- Tmp 2nd Lt. Norman Hope, General List
- Lt. Arthur Henry Howard, Yeomanry, attd. West Yorkshire Reg.
- Tmp 2nd Lt. Harry Howard, attd. Northumberland Fusiliers and Royal Flying Corps
- 2nd Lt. Richard David Howell, Welsh Reg.
- Tmp 2nd Lt. Frank Hoyle, South Staffordshire Reg.
- 2nd Lt. Wilfred Hubball, North Staffordshire Reg.
- Lt. Frederick Peter Hughes, Royal Engineers
- Tmp 2nd, Lt. William Hughes, Bedfordshire Reg.
- 2nd Lt. Albert Edward Thomas Hunt, Royal Field Arty.
- 2nd Lt. Charles Baddon Spurgeon Hunter, Cameron Highlanders
- Lt. George Robertson Hunter, Cameron Highlanders, attd. Royal Flying Corps
- 2nd Lt. James Lionel Hutchison, London Reg.
- Tmp 2nd Lt. Henry Irwin, Liverpool Reg.
- Lt. Henry James Ivens, Royal Field Arty.
- Capt. Frederick Stephens Jasper, Royal Field Arty.
- Tmp 2nd Lt. Vivian Henry Jenkin, East Yorkshire Reg.
- 2nd Lt. Thomas Stephen Jenkins, Royal Engineers
- Tmp Lt. Thomas Banks Jenkinson, Cav., attd. Lancers
- 2nd Lt. Edwin Cyril Jervis, West Riding Reg.
- 2nd Lt. William James Johnston, Cameron Highlanders
- Rev. William Alcuin Jones, Royal Army Chaplains' Dept.
- 2nd Lt. James Jordan, Dragoon Guards
- Capt. William Joynson, Hussars
- 2nd Lt. Lionel Evelyn Graham Judge, North Lancashire Reg.
- Tmp Lt. Kekhasru Sobraji Master Indian Medical Service
- Lt. Lindsay Patrick Grellan Kelly, Lancers
- Tmp Capt. Percy Hubert Keys, Royal Engineers
- Lt. Walter Hayton Kirkconel, Royal Field Arty.
- Lt. Geoffrey Knowles, Royal Field Arty.
- 2nd Lt. George William Koplick, East Yorkshire Reg., attd. Medium Trench Mortar Battery
- Lt. Conrad T. Lally, Royal Flying Corps
- Capt. Charles Willington Tremaine Lane, Dragoon Guards
- 2nd Lt. Frederick Joseph Larkin, London Reg.
- 2nd Lt. Herbert Russell Latimer, Royal Field Arty., attd. Trench Mortar Battery
- Capt. Vincent Augustus Lawrence, North Lancashire Reg.
- 2nd Lt. Reginald John Wilson Ledingham, Royal Field Arty.
- Tmp 2nd Lt. Thomas Lever, Liverpool Reg.
- Tmp 2nd Lt. George Henry Lewis, Northumberland Fusiliers
- Lt. Henry Watson Lindsley, Royal Field Arty.
- Tmp Capt. John Tryweryn Lloyd RAMC
- 2nd Lt. John Local, East Yorkshire Reg.
- Capt. Rupert Gordon Lockner, South Wales Borderers
- Lt. Richard Cyril Longley, London Reg.
- Capt. William Poulett Lousada, Norfolk Reg.
- Capt. Archibald Moir Park Lyle, Yeomanry, attd. Royal Highlanders
- Lt. Percy Hugh Beverley Lyon, Durham Light Inf.
- Lt. John Michael Lyons, Royal Garrison Arty.
- Lt. Richard Clarke Lyons, Royal Field Arty.
- Tmp 2nd Lt. Donald Murray Macfarlane, Lancashire Fusiliers
- Tmp Capt. James MacGregor RAMC
- Lt. Kenneth John Macintosh, attd. Indian Army
- Lt. Robert Maclntyre, Yeomanry, attd. Cameron Highlanders
- 2nd Lt. Hugh Peter Mackay, Seaforth Highlanders
- Tmp Capt. James Murdoch MacKay RAMC
- Lt. Robert Bruce Darrell MacLeod, Cameron Highlanders
- Lt. Harry Dunbar Maconochie, Royal Engineers
- 2nd Lt. Phillip Mallett, Gloucestershire Reg.
- Lt. Arthur Mann, Army Service Corps and Royal Flying Corps
- Tmp 2nd Lt. William Thomas Manning, Machine Gun Corps
- Tmp Capt. David Matthew RAMC
- Lt. Frederick William Broadbent Maufe, Royal Field Arty.
- 2nd Lt. Walter James Manley, South Wales Borderers
- Lt. Lionel Frederick Marson, Dragoon Guards
- Tmp 2nd Lt. Gerald William Massey, South Wales Borderers
- 2nd Lt. Sydney Herbert Matthews, Yeomanry
- Rev. Hugh McCalman, Royal Army Chaplains' Dept.
- Capt. Alfred James Angel McCabe-Dallas, RAMC
- 2nd Lt. John Rankin McIlroy, Royal Inniskilling Fusiliers
- Lt. James Reston McLeod, Royal Engineers
- Capt. Philip McRitchie, RAMC
- Lt. Charles Edward Hastings Medhurst, Royal Inniskilling Fusiliers, and Royal Flying Corps
- 2nd Lt. Wilfrid Law Mellor, Royal Engineers
- Tmp Capt. John Homer Miller, Manchester Reg.
- 2nd Lt. Francis Sydney Milligan, Liverpool Reg.
- Tmp 2nd Lt. Harry Mills, Royal Field Arty., attd. Medium Trench Mortar Battery
- 2nd Lt. Norman Crompton Mitchell, North Lancashire Reg.
- Lt. Charles Raymond Mobberley, London Reg.
- Lt. Benjamin Mollett, West Riding Reg.
- 2nd Lt. Peter Joseph Moloney, Royal Flying Corps
- Tmp Lt. Frewen Moor, Royal Berkshire Reg.
- Tmp Lt. William Shorland Mosse, Royal West Surrey Reg.
- 2nd Lt. Harold Alexander Mossnian, Royal Berkshire Reg.
- Lt. Geoffrey Gore Moule, Hussars
- Tmp 2nd Lt. Vivian Falconer Murdoch, Gordon Highlanders
- Tmp 2nd Lt. John Joseph Murphy, Royal Irish Fusiliers
- Tmp 2nd Lt. Cecil Frederick Nathan, General List and R.F.C
- Tmp Lt. Robert Alexander Nicholl, Royal Engineers
- Tmp 2nd Lt. Robert Rundle Nicol, attd. Essex Reg.
- Tmp 2nd Lt. Louis Carverhill Nockels, North Lancashire Reg.
- Lt. Dudley William John North, Hussars
- Tmp 2nd Lt. Charles William Nott, South Wales Borderers
- 2nd Lt. Alphoeus Frederick Nye, Gordon Highlanders
- Tmp Capt. Arthur David Openshaw, Essex Reg.
- Lt. Arthur Walter Osborn, Royal Field Arty.
- Lt. Ernest Trafford Owles, Royal Irish Fusiliers, and Royal Flying Corps
- Tmp Lt. Cyril Joseph Oake, East Yorkshire Reg.
- Capt. Gerard Edward Palmer, London Reg.
- Tmp 2nd Lt. Leonard Oscar Parkes, Royal West Surrey Reg.
- Lt. William Grindlay Paterson, Yeomanry, attd. Cameron Highlanders
- Tmp Lt. Napier Edward Lewis Pearse, Royal Engineers
- Tmp Lt. Arthur Hicks Peck, General List and Royal Flying Corps
- Lt. Leonard Jasper Peck, Indian Army Reserve of Ofc.s attd. Indian Army
- 2nd Lt. Francis Grove Peddle, Northumberland Fusiliers
- Capt. Edgar Percival DSO RAMC
- Tmp 2nd Lt. Reginald Thomas George Perkins, Army Service Corps
- Tmp Sub-Lt. Arthur Morson Perry, Royal Naval Volunteer Reserve
- 2nd Lt. Walter Ernest Phillips, London Reg.
- Lt. Charles Henry Pillman, Cav., attd. Dragoon Guards
- Tmp 2nd Lt. William Pithouse, Machine Gun Corps
- Tmp 2nd Lt. Frank Godwin Free Flatten, attd. Norfolk Reg.
- 2nd Lt. Hubert Christopher Barker Plummer, Durham Light Inf.
- Tmp Lt. Henry Pollitt, Lancashire Fusiliers
- Tmp Lt. George Alexander Porterfield, Worcestershire Reg.
- Tmp Capt. Reginald Poole Pridham, Devonshire Reg.
- 2nd Lt. Charles Vernon Powell, Royal Garrison Arty.
- Tmp Capt. Maurice Aloysius Power RAMC
- Lt. Sylvester Lindsay Quine, Cheshire Reg. and Royal Flying Corps
- Lt. Cyril George Radford, Nottinghamshire and Derbyshire Reg.
- Tmp Capt. Reginald Thompson Raine, RAMC
- Lt. Eustratio Lucas Ralli, Royal Field Arty.
- Rev. John Edward Reilly, Royal Army Chaplains' Dept.
- Tmp Lt. James Renwick, Royal Engineers
- Capt. Gerald Nairne Reynolds, Lancers
- 2nd Lt. Thomas William Richardson, Royal Field Arty.
- Tmp 2nd Lt. Robert Riddel, Argyll and Sutherland Highlanders
- 2nd Lt. George Thomas Roberts, London Reg.
- Tmp Sub-Lt. Norman Roberts, Royal Naval Volunteer Reserve
- Tmp 2nd Lt. William Roberts, Royal Welsh Fusiliers
- Capt. Christopher Rogers RAMC
- Capt. John Gray Ronaldson RAMC
- Rev. Canon Arthur Edwin Ross, Royal Army Chaplains' Dept.
- Lt. Hugo Donald Ross, Cameron Highlanders
- 2nd Lt. Evan William Rowlands, Durham Light Inf.
- Tmp 2nd Lt. William Francis Russell, Leinster Reg.
- 2nd Lt. George Sheavyn Sale, Hussars
- Tmp Capt. Lewis Gordon Sandford, Royal Field Arty.
- Tmp Lt. William Mollison Sangster, Royal Engineers
- Tmp 2nd Lt. Kenneth Gerald Sclanders, General List and Royal Flying Corps
- 2nd Lt. Charles Hubert Scott, Royal Garrison Arty.
- 2nd Lt. William Gunn Scott, Yeomanry, attd. Royal Highlanders
- 2nd Lt. William Scott-Moncrieff, Royal Field Arty.
- 2nd Lt. Thomas Willock Scroggie, Royal Field Arty.
- Lt. Thomas Richard Barter Seigne, Royal Field Arty.
- Tmp 2nd Lt. Donald Humphrey Sessions, General List and Royal Flying Corps
- 2nd Lt. Samuel Brian Shannon, London Reg.
- 2nd Lt. Frank Alan Sheen, Royal Engineers
- Lt. Joseph Ashworth Shepherd, North Lancashire Reg., attd. London Reg.
- 2nd Lt. William Simpson, Lincolnshire Reg.
- Tmp Lt. Harold Vincent Sims, Machine Gun Corps
- 2nd Lt. William Skeat, Essex Reg.
- Lt. Howard Strong Smallman, Royal Field Arty.
- Tmp Lt. Neville George Smith, Nottinghamshire and Derbyshire Reg.
- Tmp Lt. Edward Coultrnan Snape, Royal Field Arty., attd. Trench Mortar Battery
- Tmp Lt. Jerrold Bernard Solomon, Oxfordshire & Buckinghamshire Light Inf. and Royal Flying Corps
- 2nd Lt. Ralph Alfred Erskine Somerville, Royal Garrison Arty.
- Lt. Leon Joseph Gustave Souchon, Hussars
- 2nd Lt. Herbert Sparling, West Riding Reg.
- 2nd Lt. Arthur Spencer, London Reg.
- Capt. John Blanchard Springman, Yeomanry, attd. Royal Welsh Fusiliers
- Capt. Wintringham Norton Stable, Yeomanry, attd. Royal Welsh Fusiliers
- Tmp 2nd Lt. George Stevens, Royal Engineers
- Tmp Lt. Charles Douglas Storrs, Royal Engineers
- 2nd Lt. Thomas William Tyler Street, Royal Engineers
- 2nd Lt. Gilbert Arthur Streeter, Royal West Surrey Reg.
- 2nd Lt. Albert Henry Streets, London Reg.
- Tmp Lt. Maurice Strode, Royal West Surrey Reg.
- 2nd Lt. Thomas Studley, Royal Highlanders
- 2nd Lt. Glanville Syme, Seaforth Highlanders
- Tmp 2nd Lt. James McEwen Thomson Taylor, Cameron Highlanders
- Capt. Philip Herbert Teesdale, Royal Garrison Arty.
- Tmp 2nd Lt. Charley Tennison, Royal Engineers
- Tmp 2nd Lt. Alan Raymond Tetlow, Liverpool Reg.
- 2nd Lt. John Franklin Thomasson, Royal Field Arty.
- Tmp 2nd Lt. John Taylor Thompson, Royal Engineers
- Lt. Thomas Alexander Lacy Thompson, Northumberland Fusiliers
- Lt. Stanley James Till, Royal Field Arty.
- 2nd Lt. William Harry Topliss-Green, Royal Field Arty.
- Tmp Capt. Reginald Herman Tribe, RAMC
- Capt. Charles William Rowland Tuke, Royal Field Arty.
- Tmp Lt. Alfred John Tyler, General List and Royal Flying Corps
- 2nd Lt. Cyril Thomas Underhay, London Reg.
- Lt. John Lyne Vachell, Royal Field Arty., attd. Royal Flying Corps
- Tmp Capt. Henry Bernard van Praagh, Royal Marine Light Inf.
- 2nd Lt. Arthur Egbert Vautier, Royal Field Arty., attd. Trench Mortar Battery
- Tmp 2nd Lt. Frank Walker, East Yorkshire Reg.
- Tmp 2nd Lt. James Robinson Walker, Machine Gun Corps
- 2nd Lt. Matthew Henry Walker, Royal Field Arty.
- Capt. Roger Beverley Walker, Yeomanry
- 2nd Lt. Charles Henry Wallington, Oxfordshire & Buckinghamshire Light Inf.
- Tmp Lt. Cyril Michael Chavannes Ward, Machine Gun Corps
- 2nd Lt. Frank Denis Warren, Royal Field Arty.
- Capt. Charles Louis Waters, Royal Berkshire Reg.
- 2nd Lt. Percy Frederick Watts, Bedfordshire Reg.
- Tmp 2nd Lt. John Harold Webb, attd. Manchester Reg.
- Tmp Capt. John Webster, Royal Field Arty.
- Tmp 2nd Lt. Walter Kenneth Hutchison Welbourne, Royal Horse Arty.
- Tmp Lt. Charles Weld, Leinster Reg.
- 2nd Lt. John Wellbelove, Royal Garrison Arty.
- Tmp Sub-Lt. William Wellwood, Royal Naval Volunteer Reserve Reg.
- Tmp Lt. John William Kinch Wernham, Royal Berkshire Reg.
- Tmp Lt. Thomas Westby, Royal Marine Light Inf., attd. Machine Gun Corps
- 2nd Lt. Ralph Archibald White, Northumberland Fusiliers
- Lt. Robert Percy Frith White, Royal Lancaster Reg.
- Lt. Charles James Mackie Whittaker, Royal Garrison Arty.
- 2nd Lt. f. Raynsford Leopold Wemyss Whittaker, Royal Field Arty.
- 2nd Lt. Ralph Piggott Whittington-Ince, East Yorkshire Reg.
- Capt. Humphrey Wolsey Wrightwick, London Reg., attd. Tank Corps
- 2nd Lt. Leslie Barnard Williams, General List and Royal Flying Corps
- Tmp 2nd Lt. William Corbett Williamson, Royal Marine Light Inf.
- Tmp Lt. Edwin Ernest Wilson, King's African Rifles
- Rev. Bertram Wolferstan, Royal Army Chaplains' Dept.
- Lt. John Herbert Greenwood Womersley, Royal Garrison Arty. and Royal Flying Corps
- 2nd Lt. Sydney George Wood, Northumberland Fusiliers, attd. Royal Engineers
- Capt. John Francis Wortley, York & Lancaster Reg.
- Tmp 2nd Lt. Albert Edmund Wright, South Staffordshire Reg.
- Hon. Lt. and Riding Master Arthur Ernest Wright, Royal Field Arty.
- Capt. Samuel Pearson Yates, Hussars
- C.S. Maj. Alfred Edward Edwards, North Lancashire Reg.
- C.S. Maj. John Love, London Reg.
- C.S. Maj. Charles MacDonald, Manchester Reg.
- C.S. Maj. James William Whiteside, Liverpool Reg.
- Lt. Herbert Mayon Adams, Worcestershire Reg.
- Tmp 2nd Lt. Peter Adamson, North Lancashire Reg.
- Lt. Norman Greathed Alexander Alexander, Grenadier Guards
- 2nd Lt. Edward Bruce Allan, Lancashire Fusiliers
- Capt. Charles Royle Allen, Manchester Reg.
- Lt. Abraham Clifford Altham, Lancashire Fusiliers
- Lt. Douglas John Amery-Parkes, Middlesex Reg., attd. Machine Gun Corps
- Tmp Lt. Charles Archer, attd. West Yorkshire Reg.
- Tmp Lt. Leslie Vernon Ardagh, Royal Field Arty.
- Capt. Archibald Theodore Arrol
- Tmp Lt. Francis Douglas Arundell, British South Africa Police
- Capt. Robert Vacy Clifford Ash, RAMC
- 2nd Lt. Laurence Ashling, Hampshire Reg.
- Tmp 2nd Lt. John Pennington Ashton, Machine Gun Corps
- 2nd Lt. John Augustus Samuel Aylward, Yeomanry
- 2nd Lt. Arthur Babbage, Gloucestershire Reg.
- 2nd Lt. Evan Murray Macgregor Balfour, Scots Guards
- 2nd Lt. William Treanor Ball, Liverpool Reg.
- Lt. Wilfrid Barnard, King's Own Scottish Borderers
- Capt. John Canning Lethbridge Barnett, Oxfordshire & Buckinghamshire Light Inf., and Royal Flying Corps
- 2nd Lt. Crocker Edmund Barrington, Royal Field Arty., and Royal Flying Corps
- Tmp 2nd Lt. Robert Scott Barrowman, Royal Inniskilling Fusiliers
- Tmp 2nd Lt. Basil Dixon Bate, General List attd. Royal Flying Corps
- Tmp Lt. Ernest Montague Bates, Machine Gun Corps
- 2nd Lt. John Bateson, Royal Field Arty.
- Tmp 2nd Lt. John Baxendale, Machine Gun Corps
- 2nd Lt. George-Beaumont, East Surrey Reg.
- Tmp Lt. Nathaniel Harry Beedham, Nottinghamshire and Derbyshire Reg.
- Lt. Richard George Garfield Beesley, Norfolk Reg.
- Lt. George Clarence Beetham, York & Lancaster Reg.
- Capt. Karl Vere Barker-Benfield DSO Royal Garrison Arty.
- Lt. Gorton Vaughan Bernays, West Riding Reg.
- Capt. Arthur Joseph Beveridge RAMC
- Capt. Henry Anthony Birkbeck, Yeomanry
- Lt. Douglas Black, West Riding Reg.
- Tmp 2nd Lt. James McKinlay Black, Highland Light Inf.
- Capt. John Holiday Blackburn RAMC
- 2nd Lt. Alec Stuart Blacklaws, Royal Field Arty.
- Lt. William Norman Bladen, North Staffordshire Reg.
- Capt. Thomas Reginald Blain, Royal Lancaster Reg.
- Lt. William Robert Blair, Argyll and Sutherland Highlanders
- Lt. Harold Ernest Blunt, Yeomanry
- Lt. John Boden Boden, Royal Field Arty.
- 2nd Lt. Eyton FitzGerald Bond, Royal Garrison Arty.
- 2nd Lt. Geoffrey Lezaire Bonsor, West Yorkshire Reg.
- 2nd Lt. William Harrison Bordass, Royal Field Arty.
- Lt. Thomas James Bolle Bosvile, Rifle Brigade
- Tmp Lt. Robert Matthew Boyle, Royal Inniskilling Fusiliers
- Capt. Norman Napier Evelyn Bray, Indian Cav.
- 2ad Lt. James Brockman, Royal Field Arty.
- Tmp 2nd Lt. Cecil Bernard Brooke, Machine Gun Corps
- Tmp Lt. Ralph Seath Stark Brown, General List, and Royal Flying Corps
- Lt. Oliver Campbell Bryson, Yeomanry, and Royal Flying Corps
- Tmp Lt. James William Buckley, Royal Field Arty.
- Tmp 2nd Lt. Paul Ward Spencer Bulman, General List, and Royal Flying Corps
- 2nd Lt. Alfred Haunsell Burman, Rifle Brigade, Spec. Reserve
- Tmp Lt. Alexander Brown Burton, Highland Light Inf.
- 2nd Lt. John Lewen Byrne, Seaforth Highlanders
- 2nd Lt. David Dandie Cairnie, Seaforth Highlanders
- Lt. Donald Campbell, Seaforth Highlanders
- Capt. Donald Swinton Campbell, Yeomanry
- Lt. Sir William Andrews Ava Campbell Bt Yeomanry
- Lt. Alexander James Walker Carnie, Gordon Highlanders
- 2nd Lt. William Alexander Christie Carr, Royal Field Arty.
- 2nd Lt. Frederick William Arthur Carter, Shropshire Light Inf.
- Tmp 2nd Lt. John Cassidy, attd. Lancashire Fusiliers
- Tmp 2nd Lt. Clifford Worthley Caswell, Middlesex Reg.
- Lt. Michael Chapman, Grenadier Guards
- 2nd Lt. Thomas Chapman, Royal Warwickshire Reg.
- Lt. Albany Kenneth Charlesworth, Dragoon Guards
- Lt. Robert Leslie Chidlaw-Roberts, Hampshire Reg., and Royal Flying Corps
- Lt. James Martin Child, Manchester Reg., and Royal Flying Corps
- Tmp 2nd Lt. Leslie Howard Chivers, Machine Gun Corps
- 2nd Lt. Charles Lawrence Clarson, Royal Engineers
- Tmp 2nd Lt. Harry Cleal, Essex Reg.
- 2nd Lt. Harold Gardiner Cobon, Yeomanry
- Tmp 2nd Lt. Frank Cocker, Yorkshire Light Inf.
- Tmp Lt. Harry Ronald Collier, King's Own Scottish Borderers
- Lt. Arthur Edgar Gerald Collins, Royal Engineers
- Capt. Dennis Comins, Royal Engineers
- Lt. Edmund Samuel Winter Cooke, South Wales Borderers
- 2nd Lt. John Henry Cooper, Argyll and Sutherland Highlanders, and Royal Flying Corps
- Tmp Capt. Joseph Victor, Cope RAMC
- Tmp 2nd Lt. Thomas Charles Cooper, Royal Lancaster Reg.
- Lt. Henry Frank Cornick, Royal Engineers
- Tmp 2nd Lt. John Cowherd, Worcestershire Reg.
- Tmp Lt. Thomas William Cox, Royal Inniskilling Fusiliers
- Tmp 2nd Lt. Robert Miles Crabtree, West Yorkshire Reg.
- Lt. Edward Archibald Crane, Royal Engineers
- Rev. Kenneth Northcote Crisford, Royal Army Chaplains' Dept.
- 2nd Lt. Charles Henry Crouch, Royal Garrison Arty.
- Tmp 2nd Lt. John Ison Cuffley, Machine Gun Corps
- Capt. James Cuthbert, Royal Welsh Fusiliers
- Lt. Charles Harry Rutherford Dain, Royal Engineers
- Tmp 2nd Lt. Richard Edward Darnley, Army Service Corps
- Capt. Charles O'Brien Daunt, Indian Cav.
- Capt. Evan John Carne David, Yeomanry
- Tmp 2nd Lt. James Douglas Davidson, attd. Rifle Brigade
- Tmp 2nd Lt. David Morris Davies, attd. Welsh Reg.
- 2nd Lt. Thomas Talvin Davies, Welsh Reg.
- 2nd Lt. William Herbert Davies, Durham Light Inf.
- Tmp 2nd Lt. James Ernest Davis, Royal Inniskilling Fusiliers
- 2nd Lt. Joseph Frederick Davis, Royal Engineers
- 2nd Lt. Walter Ernest Davis, Gloucestershire Reg., and Royal Flying Corps
- Lt. Frank Henry Dear, Royal Sussex Reg., and Royal Flying Corps
- Tmp 2nd Lt. Thomas William Deeves, Middlesex Reg.
- Lt. Henry Eustace Bligh de Gruchy, Shropshire Light Inf.
- Lt. Louis Anthony de Jongh, Royal Field Arty.
- 2nd Lt. William George Denereaz, Border Reg.
- Tmp Capt. Charles Beauclerk Despard, Dragoons
- Lt. Joseph Charles Brendin Devoy, Royal Dublin Fusiliers
- Q.M. and Hon. Lt. James Dicks, Highland Light Inf.
- Tmp Capt. David McMurray Dickson, RAMC
- Lt. George Leishman Dickson, Highland Light Inf.
- Lt. George Eric Attwood Disturnal, Royal Engineers
- Lt. George Humphrey Stansfield Dixon, Royal Horse Arty.
- 2nd Lt. Priestly Donne, West Yorkshire Reg.
- 2nd Lt. William Charles Henry Dore, L.C.
- 2nd Lt. Thomas Crook Duckworth DCM Royal Warwickshire Reg.
- Lt. Joseph Hume Dudgeon, Dragoons
- Lt. Ian Archibald James Duff, Dorsetshire Reg., and Royal Flying Corps
- Lt. Edmund Lloyd Hain Dunkerton, York & Lancaster Reg.
- Lt. S. Dutt, Indian Medical Service
- Tmp 2nd Lt. Frank Eames, South Wales Borderers
- Lt. Albert Ewan Earle, Yorkshire Light Inf.
- Lt. Frederick Francis Edbrooke, Yeomanry
- Tmp Lt. John Edmunds Edwards, Machine Gun Corps
- 2nd Lt. William Ace Edwards, Nottinghamshire and Derbyshire Reg.
- Lt. Arthur Winterbottom Elliott, Bedfordshire Reg.
- 2nd Lt. Albert Ellwood, Royal Lancaster Reg.
- 2nd Lt. Arthur Bertram Entwistle, Leicestershire Reg.
- Tmp Capt. Christmas Richard Evans, Welsh Reg.
- 2nd Lt. John Henry Evans, Royal Lancaster Reg.
- Lt. William Alfred Everitt, Argyll and Sutherland Highlanders
- 2nd Lt. Arthur Everton, Royal Garrison Arty.
- Tmp Lt. Harold Cecil Eves, Machine Gun Corps
- Capt. Douglas Falconer, Gordon Highlanders
- Tmp 2nd Lt. Sydney Ernest Farbon, attd. Northamptonshire Reg.
- 2nd Lt. Edward Fawcett, Durham Light Inf.
- Capt. George Fenwick-Owen, Yeomanry
- Capt. Fritz Eberhard Ferguson, West Yorkshire Reg.
- 2nd Lt. Robert Leighton Moore Ferrie, Royal Flying Corps
- Capt. John Douglas Fiddes, RAMC
- 2nd Lt. Frank William Fielding, Nottinghamshire and Derbyshire Reg.
- Lt. George Sidney Fillingham, Durham Light Inf.
- 2nd Lt. Philip Gerard Finch, Northumberland Fusiliers
- Tmp 2nd Lt. John Finney, Royal Inniskilling Fusiliers
- Lt. Richard Helden Forster, Middlesex Reg.
- Lt. George Flett, Seaforth Highlanders
- Tmp 2nd Lt. Hubert Charles Franklin, Royal Dublin Fusiliers
- 2nd Lt. John Courtney Fraser, Grenadier Guards, attd. Machine Gun Guards
- Capt. John Henry Pearson Fraser RAMC
- Tmp 2nd Lt. Ernest Howard Freer, Royal Engineers
- Tmp Lt. Francis Aylmer Frost, Cav.
- Capt. Joseph Lawrence Fry, Royal Field Arty.
- 2nd Lt. Percy Claude Furlong, Royal Field Arty.
- Capt. Philip Jacob Gaffiin RAMC
- Tmp 2nd Lt. Henry John Gale MM Royal Engineers
- 2nd Lt. David Menmuir Gall, Scottish Rifles
- Tmp Capt. Hugh Bernard German, RAMC
- Tmp Lt. Arthur Harry Ashfield Giles, Nottinghamshire and Derbyshire Reg.
- Lt. Edward Giles, King's Own Scottish Borderers Spec. Reserve
- Tmp Capt. Francis Joseph Glynn, Royal Field Arty.
- Tmp Capt. Frederick William Goddard, Essex Reg.
- 2nd Lt. Archibald Gordon, Royal Garrison Arty.
- Capt. James Hall McIntosh Gordon, Gordon Highlanders
- Tmp Lt. Kenneth Gordon, Machine Gun Corps
- 2nd Lt. Herbert Victor Gould, Seaforth Highlanders
- 2nd Lt. John Kenneth Leslie Graham, Royal Field Arty.
- Capt. Lancelot Cecil Torbock Graham, Indian Cav.
- 2nd Lt. Henry Herbert Brett Grain, Cambridgeshire Reg.
- Tmp Capt. Frank Arthur Grange RAMC
- Tmp 2nd Lt. John Alwyne Graves, attd. Lincolnshire Reg.
- Tmp Capt. Edwin Allan Thomas Green, RAMC
- 2nd Lt. Alexander Anton Gunn, Seaforth Highlanders
- Lt. Reginald Hale-White, Yorkshire Light Inf.
- Tmp Capt. Augustus Henry Hall, Royal Irish Rifles
- Tmp 2nd Lt. William Hall, Worcestershire Reg.
- 2nd Lt. Alexander Hunter Halliday, York & Lancaster Reg.
- Tmp Lt. Arthur Collis Hallowes RAMC
- Tmp Lt. Prank George Hamilton, Royal Fusiliers
- 2nd Lt. Cyril Elmore Hammond, Irish Guards
- 2nd Lt. Herbert Hardaker, West Riding Reg.
- Capt. Henry Norman Harding, Yeomanry
- Lt. The Hon. Alexander Henry Louis Hardinge, Grenadier Guards
- Lt. Archibald Percy Harris, Royal Field Arty.
- 2nd Lt. Ernest Edward Harris, Gloucestershire Reg.
- Lt. Eric William Harris, West Riding Reg.
- Tmp 2nd Lt. Nathan Leonard Harris, attd. Royal Welsh Fusiliers
- Lt. Stanley Dickinson Harrison, Lancashire Fusiliers
- Lt. Stewart Sandbach Harrison, Irish Guards, attd. Machine Gun Guards
- Capt. Henry John Harvey, King's Own Scottish Borderers
- Lt. Marcus Goodbody Haughton, Yeomanry
- Tmp 2nd Lt. Albert Hawkes, Bedfordshire Reg.
- Lt. Thomas Hawkins, Yeomanry
- 2nd Lt. Percival Hay, Welsh Reg.
- Lt. Sidney Pascoe Hayward, West Riding Reg.
- Lt. Arthur William Haywood, Gloucestershire Reg.
- Tmp 2nd Lt. Gregory Ignatius George Michael Thomas Head, Suffolk Reg.
- Lt. Albert Victor Heal, Royal Field Arty.
- Tmp 2nd Lt. John Thomas Healey, Royal Welsh Fusiliers
- Tmp 2nd Lt. George Godfrey Heathcock, Royal Engineers
- Lt. John Hector, Gordon Highlanders
- Lt. Cuthbert Charles Hedges, Royal Berkshire Reg.
- Tmp 2nd Lt. Gordon Henderson, Middlesex Reg.
- Tmp 2nd Lt. Paul Matthew Heptinstall, Royal Engineers
- Lt. Nathaniel Hess, Royal Field Arty.
- Tmp 2nd Lt. Austen Heyes, attd. Liverpool Reg.
- Tmp Capt. Charles Frederick Highett, Royal Engineers
- Lt. John James Hill, York & Lancaster Reg.
- 2nd Lt. Samuel Frederick Hill, Royal Field Arty.
- Lt. Thomas Ide Hill, Essex Reg.
- 2nd Lt. Francis Percy Hodge, Royal Field Arty.
- 2nd Lt. Charles Frederick Griffith Hollis, East Kent Reg.
- 2nd Lt. Robert Christmas Hollis, Lancers, and Machine Gun Corps
- Tmp Lt. James Reginald Hucker, East Surrey Reg.
- Lt. Charles Kerielm Hulbert, Wiltshire Reg.
- Tmp 2nd Lt. William Charles Ibbott, Yorkshire Light Inf.
- Lt. Cecil Eustace Irby, Grenadier Guards
- 2nd Lt. Harry Irish, West Yorkshire Reg.
- 2nd Lt. Joseph Henry Irons, West Riding Reg.
- 2nd Lt. Arthur Stanley Jack, West Riding Reg.
- Tmp 2nd Lt. Stewart Spiers Jackson, Worcestershire Reg.
- Lt. William Jaffrey, Argyll and Sutherland Highlanders
- Tmp Lt. Paul Theodore James, Army Service Corps
- Tmp 2nd Lt. James Jenkins, Northumberland Fusiliers
- 2nd Lt. Louis Augustus Fram Jeppe, Royal Field Arty.
- 2nd Lt. Roger Bridge Johnson, Hussars
- Tmp 2nd Lt. John Walter Johnston, attd. Border Reg.
- Lt. William Jeffray Johnstone, Yeomanry
- Lt. George Basil Harris Jones, Yeomanry
- Tmp Capt. James Phillips Jones, RAMC
- 2nd Lt. Kenneth Leslie Jones, Welsh Reg.
- Tmp Capt. Frederick Bennett Julian RAMC
- 2nd Lt. Douglas Gordon Kemp, Royal Engineers
- Tmp 2nd Lt. Robert Nathaniel Kennedy, Royal Irish Rifles
- Tmp 2nd Lt. Lawrence Kimberley, Royal Warwickshire Reg.
- Capt. George Geoffrey Kinder, West Yorkshire Reg.
- 2nd Lt. William Donald King, Royal Garrison Arty.
- Tmp 2nd Lt. Edward Kinkead, Bedfordshire Reg.
- Tmp 2nd Lt. Albert Marlow Kinnear, General List, and Royal Flying Corps
- 2nd Lt. Alfred Ovenden Knight, North Lancashire Reg.
- Tmp 2nd Lt. Arthur Arnold Kirkham, attd. Middlesex Reg.
- Tmp 2nd Lt. Hubert Knight, West Yorkshire Reg.
- 2nd Lt. Leonard Harry Knowles, Suffolk Reg.
- 2nd Lt. Willie Knowles, West Riding Reg.
- Tmp 2nd Lt. Robert Kyle Knox, Royal Irish Rifles
- Tmp 2nd Lt. Edward Dion Lane, Machine Gun Corps
- Capt. Hardinge Lathom-Browne, Royal Fusiliers
- Lt. Raymond Duff Lawford, Grenadier Guards
- Lt. Percy Hastings Leach, Royal Field Arty.
- 2nd Lt. Francis John Lear, Royal Horse Arty.
- Tmp 2nd Lt. Arthur Stanley Lee, Nottinghamshire and Derbyshire Reg. and Royal Flying Corps
- Lt. Esmé Gordon Linton, King Edward's Horse
- Tmp Lt. Albert Peregrine Lloyd, Welsh Reg.
- Lt. John Charles Lloyd, Royal Field Arty.
- Tmp 2nd Lt. Walter Edward Lovejoy, Royal Warwickshire Reg.
- 2nd Lt. John Lunn, Worcestershire Reg.
- 2nd Lt. Francis Murray Bernard Lutyens, Coldstream Guards
- 2nd Lt. Robert George Macadam, Royal Garrison Arty.
- Lt. Malcolm Macfarlane, Royal Engineers
- Tmp Capt. Arthur Griffiths Maitland-Jones, RAMC
- Lt. John Mackenzie, Seaforth Highlanders
- Lt. William Wyllie MacNaught RAMC
- 2nd Lt. Charles Mactaggart, Argyll and Sutherland Highlanders
- Capt. Manliffe Unsworth Manly, Border Reg.
- Rev. Charles Campbell Manning, Royal Army Chaplains' Dept.
- Tmp Capt. James Manuel RAMC
- Lt. John Marshall RAMC
- Lt. William Edward Albert Masters, Royal Engineers
- Lt. Ronald Frank Strickland Mauduit, Dragoon Guards and Royal Flying Corps
- Capt. Aymer Douglas Maxwell, Royal Scots
- Lt. Herbert Richard Dudfield May, Royal Warwickshire Reg.
- 2nd Lt. Reginald Walter May, Welsh Reg.
- Tmp Capt. Duncan John McAfee RAMC
- Lt. James Russell Royal Field Arty.
- Tmp Capt. Frederick Buick McCarter RAMC
- Lt. Conolly John Hillhouse McCausland, Yorkshire Light Inf.
- Tmp 2nd Lt. James McFarlane, Machine Gun Corps
- 2nd Lt. Maurice Anderdon McFerran, Royal Irish Rifles
- Lt. James Gordon McIntyre, Yeomanry
- Lt. John Patrick McKemzie, attd. Royal Engineers
- Tmp 2nd Lt. Thomas McKnight, Royal Inniskilling Fusiliers
- Lt. Guy Wilkinson Meats, West Yorkshire Reg., Spec
- 2nd Lt. Frederick William Meston, Gordon Highlanders
- 2nd Lt. Harry Metcalfe, West Riding Reg.
- 2nd Lt. Leonard John Miles, Essex Reg.
- Capt. Owen Miles, Royal Field Arty.
- 2nd Lt. Ernest Leonard Mills, London Reg.
- Tmp Lt. George Henry Mills, Royal Welsh Fusiliers
- Tmp Lt. William Watt Milne, Middlesex Reg.
- Lt. George Esmond Milward, Royal Field Arty.
- Lt. Allan Mitchell, York & Lancaster Reg.
- Lt. Eric Sydney Mitchell, Worcestershire Reg.
- Tmp 2nd Lt. James Mitchell, Royal Inniskilling Fusiliers
- Capt. Alaric Rimington Moncrieff, Dragoons
- Tmp Capt. James Allen Montgomery RAMC
- 2nd Lt. Donald Arthur Birbeck Moodie, Irish Guards
- 2nd Lt. John Moor, West Yorkshire Reg.
- 2nd Lt. James Alexander Moreland, Royal Irish Rifles
- Rev. Abraham Rees Morgan, Royal Army Chaplains' Dept.
- Lt. David Floyd Popkin Morgan, Yeomanry
- 2nd Lt. Arthur Henry Morris, Middlesex Reg.
- Temp2nd Lt. Edward Morris, Yorkshire Light Inf.
- Capt. George Morris RAMC
- 2nd Lt. John Frederick Morrison, Lancashire Fusiliers
- Tmp Lt. David Assur Henry Moses, RAMC
- Lt. Edward James Moss, Yeomanry
- Lt. Cecil Eric Moy, London Reg.
- Capt. James Belling Mudge, Nottinghamshire and Derbyshire Reg.
- Risaldar Mukand Singh Bahadur, Indian Cav.
- 2nd Lt. Arthur Ernest Mulholland, Royal Horse Arty.
- 2nd Lt. William Thomas John Munday, Royal Field Arty.
- 2nd Lt. James Hendrie Munro, Seaforth Highlanders
- 2nd Lt. Martin, Munro, York & Lancaster Reg.
- Lt. John Neil, Argyll and Sutherland Highlanders, attd. Machine Gun Corps
- 2nd Lt. Alexander Millar Meish, Argyll and Sutherland Highlanders
- Lt. Richard Robert Oakley, Yeomanry, attd. Machine Gun Corps
- Lt. Benjamin Fiellerup O'Dowda, Royal Engineers
- 2nd Lt. Bruce Oliver, Royal Field Arty.
- Tmp Lt. Henry Marsden Oliver, Royal Field Arty.
- 2nd Lt. Walter Hugh Ormiston Hugh, London Reg.
- Tmp Lt. Evan Edward Owens, RAMC
- Lt. William Walter Keith Page, attd. Indian Cav.
- Tmp 2nd Lt. Dennis Lello Adkins Paine MM Royal Warwickshire Reg.
- 2nd Lt. Robert McAulay Park, Argyll and Sutherland Highlanders
- 2nd Lt. William Bullus Parker, East Surrey Reg.
- Tmp 2nd Lt. Albert Parry, Worcestershire Reg.
- 2nd Lt. James Henry Partridge, Royal Irish Fusiliers
- Capt. Jesse John Paskin, Worcestershire Reg., attd. Machine Gun Corps
- Tmp 2nd Lt. William Hanna Patterson, Royal Inniskilling Fusiliers
- Tmp 2nd Lt. Frederick Charles Peel, General List
- Tmp 2nd Lt. Charles Ernest Pegram, Rifle Brigade
- Rev. Albert Frederick Pentney, Royal Army Chaplains' Dept.
- Tmp 2nd Lt. Francis George Wood Pepper, West Riding Reg.
- Capt. Harold Dobson Pickles RAMC
- Lt. Frederick William Piggin, Yeomanry
- 2nd Lt. Charles Lawrence Porteous, Royal Irish Fusiliers
- 2nd Lt. Bennis Hammond Portway, Yeomanry
- Rev. Henry Regan Potter, Royal Army Chaplains' Dept.
- Capt. William Gerald Howell Powell-Edwards, Yeomanry
- Lt. Frank Whitchurch Priaulx, Scots Guards
- Tmp 2nd Lt. William Price, Royal Inniskilling Fusiliers
- Capt. John Alexander Pridham, RAMC
- Capt. Inkerman T. Pritchard, Worcestershire Reg.
- Tmp Capt. Arthur Montague William Proctor, Suffolk Reg.
- Tmp 2nd Lt. Herbert Victor Pugh, Dorsetshire Reg.
- 2nd Lt. James William Pugh, West Yorkshire Reg.
- Lt. Peter Purcell-Gilpin, Scots Guards
- Tmp 2nd Lt. George Forrest Raeside, Royal Lancaster Reg.
- Capt. William Taunton Raikes, South Wales Borderers, attd. Machine Gun Corps
- Capt. Thomas Alexander Rattray, Yeomanry
- Lt. Geoffrey Earle Raven, West Yorkshire Reg.
- Tmp 2nd Lt. Ernest Hubert Rawson, Royal Field Arty.
- Tmp 2nd Lt. Stanley Richard, Machine Gun Corps
- Tmp 2nd Lt. William Richards, Machine Gun Corps
- 2nd Lt. William Victor Richards, Dorsetshire Reg.
- Q.M. and Hon. Capt. Henry Shred Roberts, Essex Reg.
- 2nd Lt. John Roberts, Royal Field Arty.
- Tmp Capt. John Price Roberts, Machine Gun Corps
- Lt. Thomas Norman Roberts, Royal Garrison Arty.
- Capt. William Robertson RAMC
- Lt. Vyvyan Arthur Hemming Robeson, Royal Flying Corps
- Lt. Alfred Robinson, Yorkshire Light Inf.
- Tmp 2nd Lt. Gilbert Arthur Robinson, West Yorkshire Reg.
- 2nd Lt. John Lister Rodger, Yorkshire Light Inf.
- 2nd Lt. Arthur Boulivant Rogers, Shropshire Light Inf.
- 2nd Lt. William Wendell Rogers, Royal Flying Corps
- 2nd Lt. Cyril Williams Rowlands, London Reg.
- Tmp Capt. Lionel Matthew Rowlette DSO RAMC
- Q.M. and Hon. Lt. George Matthew Runiball, Yeomanry
- Lt. Alec Charles Russell, Royal Field Arty.
- Tmp Capt. Cedric Russell RAMC
- Capt. Henry Thornbury Fox Russell, Royal Welsh Fusiliers and Royal Flying Corps
- 2nd Lt. George Rutherford, Gordon Highlanders
- Tmp Capt. Robert Rutherford RAMC
- 2nd Lt. Albert Henry Salmon, Gordon Highlanders
- Tmp 2nd Lt. Eric Denton Samuel, attd. Middlesex Reg.
- Capt. Mervyn Savill, London Reg.
- Lt. Edward Charles Sawyer, West Yorkshire Reg.
- Capt. Alfred Carlisle Sayer, Yeomanry
- Tmp 2nd Lt. Percy Scholes, Yorkshire Light Inf.
- Tmp 2nd Lt. William Shairp, L.C.
- Tmp Capt. William Harold Nelson Shakespeare, Royal Flying Corps
- 2nd Lt. Lawrence Ernest Shaw-Lawrence, East Kent Reg. and Royal Flying Corps
- 2nd Lt. Gilbert Recklaw Singleton-Gates, Hampshire Reg.
- Tmp 2nd Lt. James Anderson Slater, General List and Royal Flying Corps
- Tmp 2nd Lt. Ernest Rees Smith, Machine Gun Corps
- 2nd Lt. Frank James Smith MM Royal Berkshire Reg.
- Lt. John Hunter Smith, Royal Field Arty.
- Tmp 2nd Lt. Joseph Harold Smith, Border Reg.
- Lt. Joseph Thomson Smith, Royal Field Arty.
- Lt. Victor Wallace Smith, Indian Army Reserve of Ofc.s
- Tmp 2nd Lt. Isaiah Somerset, Royal Irish Rifles
- Lt. Patrick Magnus Spence, Grenadier Guards
- Lt. Humphrey Henry Sloane Stanley, Grenadier Guards
- Lt. James Stewart, Royal Horse Arty.
- Capt. William Stewart, Royal Irish Fusiliers
- 2nd Lt. Walter John Stokes, Worcestershire Reg.
- Lt. Edgar James Stone, Royal Guernsey Light Inf.
- Rev. Frank Stone Royal Army Chaplains' Dept.
- Capt. Stanley James Stotesbury, Gloucestershire Reg.
- Lt. James Strachan, Gordon Highlanders
- Lt. Harry Easterbrook Knollys Stranger, Royal Guernsey Light Inf.
- Lt. Ralph Tyacke Stratton, Cav.
- Lt. Stewart O'Roke Surridge, York & Lancaster Reg.
- Tmp 2nd Lt. Charles Stevens Sutherland, Northumberland Fusiliers
- Tmp Capt. Brian Herbert Swift RAMC
- Lt. Neville Cropley Swift, East Lancashire Reg.
- Tmp Capt. John Roy Symes, South Wales Borderers
- Tmp Lt. Reginald Stanislaus Victor Talbot, Gloucestershire Reg.
- 2nd Lt. Harold Vincent Tewson, West Yorkshire Reg.
- Tmp Lt. Herbert James Thomas, Liverpool Reg.
- 2nd Lt. Reginald Thomas, South Wales Borderers
- Tmp Lt. Ernest John Tytler Thompson, Highland Light Inf.
- Tmp 2nd Lt. George Thompson, York & Lancaster Reg.
- 2nd Lt. Joseph Thompson, West Riding Reg.
- Capt. Arthur Peregrine Thomson, RAMC
- Tmp 2nd Lt. Douglas Gordon Thomson, Rifle Brigade
- 2nd Lt. George Frederick Thorn, Royal Field Arty.
- Lt. Thomas Thornton, Royal Field Arty.
- 2nd Lt. Fred Herbert Thubron, Royal Field Arty.
- Capt. Thomas Ernest Tildesley, North Staffordshire Reg.
- 2nd Lt. Alfred Eric Titley, Devonshire Reg.
- Tmp 2nd Lt. Ernest James Tranter, Royal Warwickshire Reg.
- Tmp 2nd Lt. Thomas Trohear, Nottinghamshire and Derbyshire Reg.
- Lt. Hugh Martin Trower, Middlesex Reg.
- Tmp 2nd Lt. John Beazley Tyner DCM Royal Inniskilling Fusiliers
- 2nd Lt. Leo Francis Veal, West Yorkshire Reg.
- Tmp Capt. George Dibbs King Waldron RAMC
- 2nd Lt. Thomas John Walford, Royal Field Arty.
- Lt. James Graham Bryce Walker, Highland Light Inf.
- Capt. Douglas Larmer Wall RAMC
- Lt. William John Ward, London Reg.
- Tmp 2nd Lt. William Moss Wardell, Machine Gun Corps
- Tmp 2nd Lt. Francis Ernest Warran, attd. Duke of Cornwall's Light Inf.
- 2nd Lt. Frederick Washington, Royal Inniskilling Fusiliers
- Tmp Lt. Joseph Gilbert Webb, Royal Welsh Fusiliers
- 2nd Lt. Nicholas Victor Webber, Shropshire Light Inf.
- Lt. Robert Kemp Wellwood, Seaforth Highlanders
- 2nd Lt. Edward Harnston Weston, London Reg.
- 2nd Lt. Frederick Victor White, Royal Field Arty.
- Capt. John Donald White DSO Middlesex Reg.
- Lt. Robert White, London Reg.
- 2nd Lt. Arthur Whitfield, Royal Berkshire Reg.
- Lt. Arthur George Whittington, Middlesex Reg.
- Capt. Dysart Edward Whitworth, Indian Cav.
- Lt. Harold Gwynne Wiggins, Grenadier Guards
- Tmp 2nd Lt. William Henry Wild, Lancashire Fusiliers
- Lt. Alfred Leonard Wilkes, Royal Field Arty.
- Tmp 2nd Lt. Arthur Stuart Williams, Royal Welsh Fusiliers
- 2nd Lt. Edward Tom Williams, Royal Field Arty.
- 2nd Lt. Frank Williams, Royal Engineers
- Lt. John Wilson, Yeomanry
- Tmp Capt. Emilius Albert Ernest Wilson-Weichart, Army Service Corps
- 2nd Lt. George Howard Wintle, Gloucestershire Reg.
- Tmp 2nd Lt. Gordon Thomas Worn, Norfolk Reg.
- 2nd Lt. James Wijliam Worth, West Yorkshire Reg.
- Lt. Richard Louis Wreford-Brown, Welsh Guards
- Rev. Arthur Basil Wright, Royal Army Chaplains' Dept.
- Tmp 2nd Lt. Edward Grigg Wylie, Durham Light Inf.
- Capt. James Anderson Young, RAMC
- Capt. James Carruthers Young RAMC
- Capt. John Hamilton Langdon Yorke, Yeomanry
- Battery Sergeant Major George Fettis Bowden, Royal Field Arty.
- C.S. Maj. Albert Brough DCM West Yorkshire Reg.
- C.S. Maj. John Cameron, Royal Highlanders
- C.S. Maj. Joseph Carroll, Royal Irish Fusiliers
- Sgt. Major Frank Hulbert, RAMC
- C.S. Maj. Thomas Jones, South Wales Borderers
- C.S. Maj. Herbert Henry Stone, South Wales Borderers
- Sgt. Major Robert Millar Lowe Walkinshaw MM London Reg.

=== Australian Imperial Force ===
- Capt. Cyril Abey, Headquarters, Australian Army Service Corps
- Capt. Victor Clarkson Alderson, Inf.
- Capt. Arthur Max Allen, Engineers
- Capt. Ernest Sleeman Anderson, Engineers
- Lt. William Thomas Anderson, Tunneling Company, attd. Mining and Boring Company
- Lt. Daniel Herbert Anthon, Inf.
- Lt. Reginald Bartley Ashe, Engineers
- Capt. Basil Spence Atkinson, Inf.
- Rev. Michael Bergin, Australian Chaplains' Dept.
- Lt. Alexander Bickers, Trench Mortar Battery
- Capt. Ewen Mackay Bland, Inf.
- Rev. Joseph John Booth, Australian Chaplains' Dept.
- Rev. Vivian Roy Bradbury, Australian Chaplains' Dept.
- Lt. Arthur Clarence Brewster, Inf.
- Lt. Claude Edmund Burke, Field Arty.
- Capt. Edmund Louis Burke, Field Arty.
- Capt. Harold Burke, Inf.
- Capt. Henry Charles Dight Cadell, Inf.
- Capt. Archibald Eric Gordon Campbell, Anzac Imperial Camel Corps
- Capt. Cecil James Carroll, Inf.
- Capt. Alexander Chalmers, Pioneer Battalion
- Capt. Charles Mulso Compigne Chase, Field Arty.
- Lt. Frederick Graham Spower Cherry, Inf., attd. Light Trench Mortar Battery
- Lt. Ernest Hector Christian, Inf.
- Lt. Raymond Arthur Clarie, Inf.
- Capt. Robert Adam Clinton, Tunneling Company, Engineers
- Rev. Francis Clune, Australian Chaplains' Dept.
- Lt. Robert Calvin, Inf.
- Lt. William Montague Bell Cory, Machine Gun Company
- Lt. Charles William Couchman, Inf., attd. Light Trench Mortar Battery
- Capt. George Hinchcliffe Crowther, Inf.
- Lt. John Davidson, Imperial Camel Corps
- Capt. Algernon Wiseman Davis, Inf.
- Capt. Charles Alfred Melbourne Dearham, Inf.
- Capt. Keith McKeddie Doig, Australian Army Medical Corps
- Lt. Roger Douglas, Machine Gun Company
- Rev. William Keith Douglas, Australian Chaplains' Dept.
- Capt. Granville Stuart Down, Ordnance Corps
- Lt. Charles Leo Dunn, Pioneer Battalion
- Capt. Claude Cadman Easterbrook, Light Horse Reg.
- Capt. George Stephenson Elliott, Australian Army Medical Corps
- Lt. Albert Bruchiaux Ellis, Arty.
- Capt. Alfred William Leslie Ellis, Flying Corps
- Capt. Sidney Ernest Evans, Engineers
- Capt. Wilfred Evans, Australian Army Medical Corps
- Capt. Fred Evans, Light Horse Reg.
- Lt. Eric Samuel Everett, Machine Gun Company
- Capt. Challenger George Farmer, Australian Army Service Corps
- Lt. Robert David Fisher, Inf.
- Capt. Stanley Fletcher, Australian Army Veterinary Corps
- Capt. Robert Bruce Forsyth, Inf.
- Capt. William Murray Fowler, Inf.
- Capt. Alexander Fraser, Inf.
- Capt. Alexander Hugh Fraser, Inf.
- Lt. Herbert John Gee, Light Horse Reg.
- Capt. Daniel Robert Glasgow, Australian Army Service Corps
- Rev. Hubert Keith Gordon, Australian Chaplains' Dept.
- Capt. Walter Duncross Goudie, Pioneer Battalion
- Lt. Norman Graham, Light Trench Mortar Battery
- Capt. Frank Clifton Green, Inf.
- Lt. James Grieve, Australian Army Ordnance Corps
- Capt. Henry James Gurd, Field Arty.
- Capt. Ross Alexander Peden Hamilton, Australian Machine Gun Corps
- Lt. Hector John Harrison, Inf.
- Lt. Gilbert Harry, Inf.
- Q.M. and Hon. Capt. Herbert Stanley Hawker, Inf.
- Capt. John Martin Hawkey, Inf.
- Lt. Ronald Graham Henderson, Inf.
- 2nd Lt. Peter Hendley, Arty.
- Lt. Walter Henry Higgins, Engineers
- Capt. Robert Irvine Hillard, Inf.
- Lt. John Mervyn Hobbs, Arty.
- Capt. Richard Hastings Hudson, Australian Army Medical Corps
- Lt. Charles Edward Hughes, Machine Gun Corps
- Lt. James Dawson Johnston, Inf., attd. Light Trench Mortar Battery
- Lt. Rupert Charles Jones, Inf.
- Capt. Coleman Henry Joseph, Engineers
- Lt. James Edward Keating, Inf.
- Q.M. and Hon. Capt. Stanley Roy Kent, Inf.
- Capt. Henry Mackay Laity, Australian Army Service Corps
- Lt. George Arthur Lamerton, Inf.
- Lt. Cyril Lawrence, Engineers
- Lt. Harold Alexander Letch, Light Horse Reg.
- Lt. John Henry Lilley, Inf.
- Lt. James Hemery Lindon, Pioneer Battalion
- R.S. Maj. Harry Lindsay, Inf.
- Capt. John Caruthers Little, Inf.
- Lt. Clarence Robert Collie Lundy, Pioneer Battalion
- Capt. Walter Gordon Lush, Engineers
- Lt. Andrew Gardiner Macallister, Arty.
- Lt. Malcolm Hilliard McDougall, Imperial Camel Corps
- Capt. Alfred Oswald McMullin, Arty.
- Capt. Edward James McNabb, Inf.
- Capt. Harry Akhurst Mann, Inf.
- Capt. Henry Fitzgerald Maudsley, Australian Army Medical Corps
- Capt. Leonard May, Australian Army Medical Corps
- Lt. Charles Wolseley Mercer, Australian Army Service Corps
- Rev. Alfred Avery Mills, Australian Chaplains' Dept.
- Capt. Bruce Minter, Arty.
- Capt. Gerald Vincent Moriarty, Arty.
- Lt. Herbert Fraser Morrison, Inf.
- Lt. Walter John Mullett, Australian Army Service Corps
- Rev. Thomas Mullins, Chaplain to the Forces, Australian Imperial Force
- Capt. Archibald James Murray, Inf.
- Q.M. and Hon. Capt. John Francis Murray, Australian Army Medical Corps
- Lt. Henry Robert Neale, Inf.
- Q.M. and Hon. Lt. Frederick Bedford Newell, Inf.
- Lt. Alan John Newlands, Inf., attd. Light Trench Mortar Battery
- Lt. George William Norfolk, E. and M. Mining and Boring Company, Engineers
- Q.M. and Hon. Lt. Douglas Gordon Oakley, Inf.
- Lt. John Francis O'Connell, Inf.
- Rev. John Edward Norman Osborn Australian Chaplains' Dept.
- Capt. George Harry Oswald, Inf.
- Capt. Frank Edmund Page, Inf., attd. Light Trench Mortar Battery
- Capt. Ernest Kent Parry, Australian Army Medical Corps
- Capt. John Pascoe, Inf.
- Capt. Donald Barclay Payne, Inf.
- Lt. Harold Ford Pearson, Inf.
- Capt. Clarence Abraham Pyke, Australian Army Service Corps
- Capt. Cyril Norman Richardson, Inf.
- Capt. Arthur Lancelot Rickard, Arty.
- Capt. Herbert John Joseph Rigney, Australian Army Service Corps
- Lt. Harold Edgar Roach, Arty.
- Capt. Leonard Nairn Roach, Inf.
- Capt. James Stanley Rogers, Inf.
- Capt. George Rosevear, Light Horse Reg.
- Capt. Louis Carle Roth, Pioneer Battalion
- Lt. Clifford Lionel Clarence Howe, Australian Army Service Corps
- Lt. Hugh Russel, Tunneling Company, Engineers
- Capt. Arthur Percival St. John, Inf.
- Capt. Stanley George Savige, Inf.
- Capt. Colin Coape Simson, Australian Army Medical Corps
- Capt. George Henry Glencross Smith, Inf.
- Lt. Rupert Frank Smith, Engineers
- Warrant Ofc., 2nd Class, George Snowdon, Arty.
- Rev. Alexander MacEwen Stevenson, Australian Chaplains' Dept.
- Capt. John Edward Graham Stevenson, Engineers
- Capt. Geoffrey Austin Street, Inf.
- Lt. Colin Pride Stumm, Light Horse Reg.
- Capt. Charles Bowmont Taylor, Inf.
- Warrant Ofc., 1st Class, Edgar George Thompson, Arty.
- Lt. George Richard Thompson, Engineers
- Lt. Stanley Towns, Inf.
- Lt. Arthur Harold Traves, Pioneer Battalion
- Lt. Francis John Tuckett, Engineers
- 2nd Lt. John Vincent Tunbridge, Flying Corps
- R.S. Maj. Ernest Vernon Tuson, Inf.
- Lt. Arthur Cyril Roy Waite, Arty.
- Lt. Frederick Mitchell Waite, Light Horse Reg.
- Capt. Neville Wallach, Inf.
- Rev. Frederick Greenfield Ward, Australian Chaplains' Dept.
- Capt. Augustine William Wardell, Machine Gun Corps
- Lt. Albert Leslie Watson, Inf.
- Lt. Roy Gordon Webster, Inf.
- Capt. Robert Marriott William Webster, Australian Army Medical Corps
- Q.M. and Hon. Capt. Richard Packer Wheeler, Australian Army Medical Corps
- Capt. Arthur Charles White, Inf.
- Lt. Reginald Wilkinson, attd. Signal Company, Royal Engineers
- Rev. Frederick Percy Williams, Australian Chaplains' Dept.
- Lt. Garnet Angus Williamson, Inf.
- Capt. Frank Alan Wisdom, Inf.
- 2nd Lt. Stanley Stuart Woods, Inf.
- 2nd Lt.-James Sutherland Beavis, Inf.
- Capt. Norman Gorton Booth, Inf.
- 2nd Lt. Alfred Percival Brown, Inf.
- Lt. Cecil Olbers Clark, Inf.
- Lt. Henry Lawrence Foster, Inf.
- Lt. Leslie Hubert Holden, Forestry Corps
- Lt. Richard Watson Howard, Forestry Corps
- Lt. Frederick George Huxley, Forestry Corps
- Capt. Charles Launcelot Moule, Inf.
- Capt. Roy Cecil Phillips, Forestry Corps
- Lt. Harry Taylor, Forestry Corps
- Lt. Gordon Campbell Wilson, Forestry Corps
- Lt. William Martin Bermingham, Machine Gun Corps
- 2nd Lt. Richard Henry Blomfield, Inf.
- Lt. John Markham Carter, Light Horse Reg.
- 2nd Lt. Francis Cawley, Army Service Corps
- Lt. Harry Payne Chamberlain, Army Service Corps
- Capt. Archibald John Collins, Army Medical Corps
- Lt. Charles Robinson Cox, Inf.
- Capt. Jack Rupert Cyril Davies, Light Horse Reg.
- Lt. William Lezlie Garrard, Inf.
- Capt. Telford Graham Gilder, Inf.
- Capt. Eric Macallan Gordon-Glassford, Army Medical Corps
- Lt. James Norbert Griffin, Light Horse Reg.
- Capt. Ferdinand Charles Heberle, Inf.
- Lt. Bert James Jackson, Inf.
- Lt. Herbert John James, Inf.
- Lt. John Heber Johnson, Inf.
- Capt. Eric Stanley Kater, Light Horse Reg.
- Capt. Hugh Edward Kirkland, Army Medical Corps
- Lt. James Kissane, Machine Gun Corps
- Capt. Ernest William Latchford, Inf.
- Capt. Guy Ardlaw Lawrance, Army Medical Corps
- Capt. John Shaw. Mackay, Army Medical Corps
- Capt. Melrose Holton Mailer, Army Medical Corps
- Capt. John Grieve Paterson, Inf.
- Capt. Charles Robert Pinney, Inf.
- Lt. Thomas Clifton Pittaway, Inf.
- Capt. William Dempsey Quilty, Army Medical Corps
- Capt. Norman Gordon Rae, Light Horse Reg.
- Capt. Albert David Reid, Light Horse Reg.
- Capt. Julian Walter Richards, Machine Gun Corps
- Lt. Rodney Keith Robey, Light Horse Reg.
- Capt. Clive Frederic Robinson, Army Medical Corps
- Capt. Walter John Rose, Pioneers
- Lt. William Richard Staton, Inf.
- Q.M. and Hon. Capt. Stephen Upton Timewell, Inf.
- Lt. Robert Gordon Walduck, Inf.
- Capt. and Flight Cmdr. Stanhope Irwing Winter-Irving, Australian Flying Corps
- 2nd Lt. John Frederiok Wood, Inf.

=== Canadian Force ===
- Capt. Herbert Charles Allison, Canadian Army Medical Corps
- Lt. William Kennedy Anderson, Inf. and Royal Flying Corps
- Lt. Alfred Edward Baker, Motor Machine Gun Corps
- Capt. James Nunn Bales, Inf.
- Lt. Clarence Vivian Bishop, Arty.
- Lt. Lennox Graham Black, Inf., attd. Trench Mortar Battery
- Capt. Frank Thompson Bown, Inf.
- Capt. Richard Redmond Brough, Inf.
- Lt. George Wood Brown, Inf.
- Capt. Harry Cauldwell, Labour Company
- Capt. Cyril William Upton Chivers, Mounted Rifles
- Lt. Charles Levinge Clayton, Inf., attd. Engineers
- Capt. Harry Kelsey Clifton, Inf.
- Lt. George Francis Clingan, Machine Gun Corps
- Lt. William Bernard Cooper, Labour Corps
- Capti. Stanley Lavelle Cunningham, Inf.
- Lt. Joseph Dakers, Inf.
- Lt. Norman Joyce D'Arcy, Labour Corps
- Lt. John Alexander Dewart, Machine Gun Corps
- Lt. Charles William Dickson, Inf.
- Capt. Thomas William Eric Dixon, Mounted Rifles
- Lt. Robert Dunlop, Inf.
- Lt. Everett Ethridge, Inf.
- Lt. Arthur James Everett, Light Horse
- Captu Charles Philip Fenwick, Canadian Army Medical Corps
- Capt. Eric Barrett Fmley, Inf.
- Capt. William Gordon Hanson, Arty.
- Capt. Robert John Gardiner, Canadian Army Medical Corps
- R.S. Maj. Arthur Garrod, Inf.
- Lt. Wallace Robert Gibson, Pioneer Battalion
- Lt. Andrew Alfred Gillis, Arty.
- Capt. Joseph Edmund Gobeil, Divisional Train
- Capt. Thomas Godfrey, Mounted Rifles
- Capt. William Douglas Bamford Goodfellow, Machine Gun Corps
- Capt. Richard Leonard Goodliff, Inf.
- Lt. Harold Victor Gould, Inf.
- Hon. Capt. Edwin Ernest Graham, Canadian Chaplains' Service
- Capt. Melvin John Graham, Inf.
- Lt. Thomas Rees Griffith, Inf.
- Lt. Eric Wilson Haldenby, Inf.
- Lt. Irving Cecil Hall, 12th Company, Canadian Machine Gun Ccrps
- Capt. Walter Archibald Harrison, Arty.
- Capt. Richard Todd Wilson Herald, Canadian Army Medical Corps
- Lt. William Duncan Herridger, Cyclist Company
- Capt. Edwin Henry Hill, Inf.
- Capt. George William Frances Hodgins, Inf.
- Lt. Stanley Burntt Her, Engineers
- Lt. Ralph Stanley Jackson, Machine Gun Corps
- Capt. Arthur Llewellyn Jones, Canadian Army Medical Corps
- Capt. Laurence St. George Kelly, Arty.
- Capt. Walter de Mayhew King, Light Horse
- Capt. Arthur Henry Whittington Landon, Royal Canadian Reg.
- Lt. Edwin Ralph Langton, Inf.
- Lt. Gerald Bristol Latimer, Engineers
- Capt. Ernest Wilkinson Lawrence, Inf.
- Capt. William Leggat, Arty.
- Lt. John Austin Loy, Arty.
- Hon. Capt. Rev. Harold McCausland, Canadian Chaplains' Service
- Lt. Duncan Daniel McCaimmon, Railway Troops
- Lt. Robert Vernon Macaulay, Arty.
- Lt. Merrick Rennie McCracken, Engineers
- Lt. Oliver Bain McCuaig, Engineers
- Capt. Alan Holmes MacDonald, Pioneer Battalion
- Lt. Geoffrey Ernest Macdonald, Inf.
- Lt. Robert Ross Macdonald, Inf.
- Hon. Capt. Rev. Roderick Andrew MacDonnel, Canadian Chaplains' Service
- Lt. llan Alderson McQueen, Arty.
- Capt. Francis Gibson Malloch, Engineers
- Lt. John Miller, Inf.
- R.S. Maj. George Mitten, Inf.
- Lt. Lome Cuthbert Montgomery, Inf.
- Tmp Lt. George Bennett Morley, Engineers
- C.S. Maj. Thomas John Moulds, Inf.
- Lt. James Hector Ross Murphy, Inf.
- Lt. Robert Newton, Arty.
- Capt. George Saher Willis Nicholson, Inf.
- Lt. William Me Adam Nickle, Inf.
- Capt. Timothy Harold O'Brien, Arty.
- Capt. Thomas Patrick O'Kelly, Inf.
- Q.M. and Hon. Capt. Leo Patenaude, Inf.
- Capt. John Millar Pauline, Royal Canadian Reg.
- Lt. Hugh Stowell Pedley, Inf.
- Lt. Arthur John Plant, Inf.
- Capt. Arthur Plow, Inf.
- Lt. Harold George Porter, Mounted Rifles
- Capt. Laurent Jacques Joseph Puanode, Engineers
- Capt. John Edward Puaslow, Inf.
- Lt. Colin Esdaile Richardson, Engineers
- Lt. William Augustus Richardson, Arty.
- Capt. William Francis Richardson, Engineers
- Lt. FredRiley, Pioneer Battalion
- Lt. William Malcolm Ross, Inf.
- Lt. Frank Dalton Scruton, Inf.
- Capt. Robert James Shore, Railway Troops
- Lt. Lester Luther Spalding, Labour Battalion
- Sgt. Major Oscar Percy Stensaud, Canadian Army Medical Corps
- Capt. Alan Edgeworth Stewart, Engineers
- Lt. Ormond Montgomery Stitt, Engineers
- Capt. Richard Arthur Tauton, Inf.
- Lt. Melville Tenbrocke, Inf.
- Lt. James Balfour Thorn, Engineers
- Lt. Melville Fitzgerald Thomson, Inf.
- Hon. Capt. Rev. Miles Nicholas Tompkins, Canadian Chaplains Service
- Lt. Archer John Toole, Inf.
- Q.M. and Hon. Capt. Oliver Travers, Inf.
- Lt. Howard Warner Tye, Inf.
- Lt. Thomas George Vant, Machine Gun Corps
- Lt. William Vassie, Arty.
- Lt. Cecil Steven Walley, Engineers
- Lt. Henry Ward, Inf., attd. Machine Gun Corps
- Lt. James Ward, Trench Mortar Battery Arty.
- Lt. Albert Edward White, Inf.
- Lt. Alfred Manson White, Railway Troops
- Lt. McLeod White, Engineers
- Q.M. and Hon. Capt. James Pye Richardson Whittle, Inf.
- Capt. Harry Wishart Whytock, Canadian Army Medical Corps
- Capt. Algernon Edward Willaughby, Royal Canadian Reg.
- Capt. Richard Todd Wilson Herald, Canadian Army Medical Corps
- Lt. Harold Gladstone Wood, Inf.
- Lt. Eric Raymond Woodward, Engineers
- Capt. Alexander Campbell Young, Engineers
- Capt. William Frederick Abbott, Canadian Army Medical Corps
- Lt. George Griffith Aitken, Canadian Field Arty.
- Lt. Oswald Pearson Arkless, Inf.
- Lt. Richard Babb, Machine Gun Corps
- Lt. William Cornwallis Bate, Engineers
- Lt. James Gordon Beatty, Canadian Field Arty.
- Capt. Reginald Vernon Blackburn, Inf.
- Lt. Percy Lytton Bonsall, Railway Troops
- Lt. Gerard Renvoize Bradbrooke, Machine Gun Corps
- Lt. Edward Samuel Brett, Inf.
- Lt. Donald Cameron, Inf.
- Lt. Hugh Clayton Cameron, Inf.
- Lt. Lome Douglas Campbell, Inf.
- Lt. James Murdoch Christie, Inf.
- Lt. Shirley Adam Clarke, Inf.
- Rev. Thomas Collins Colwell, Canadian Chaplains Service
- Capt. Albert Ernest Horsman Coo, Inf.
- Lt. William Joseph Cowen, Cav.
- Lt. Charles Douglas Crowe, Canadian Field Arty.
- Capt. Henry Clarke Davis, Canadian Army Medical Corps
- Rev. William Henry Davis, Canadian Chaplains Service
- Lt. Irvin Harrison Dawson, Canadian Field Arty.
- Lt. Arthur Wemyss Deacon, Mounted Rifles
- Lt. William Edward Denley, Inf.
- Lt. Joshua Emile Dorey, Inf.
- Lt. George Frederick Douglas, Machine Gun Corps
- Lt. Russell Howard Elliott, Inf.
- Lt. Matthew Langdon Ellis, Machine Gun Corps
- Lt. Arthur Thomas Field, Inf.
- Lt. Edward William Fleming, Cav.
- Lt. Norman Franks, Inf.
- Lt. John Howard Gainor, Inf.
- Lt. John Stupart Galbraith, Inf.
- Capt. Donald Arthur Gait, Inf.
- Lt. Ernest Irving Gill, Canadian Field Arty.
- Lt. Alexander Watson Gregory, Inf.
- Lt. Alexander Grant Gunn, Inf.
- Lt. Joseph Robson Hardy, Inf.
- Lt. Edward Hart, Garrison Arty.
- Lt. John Curtis Hartley, Machine Gun Corps
- Lt. Robert Angus Hay, Engineers
- Lt. Clarence Bruce Hill, Canadian Field Arty.
- Lt. Arthur Ernest Hall Holland, Inf.
- Lt. Bertram Edward Hull, Inf.
- Capt. Walter Jewitt, Inf.
- Lt. Herbert Hough ton Johnson, Engineers
- Lt. William Johnstons, Inf.
- Lt. Frederick Howard Marling Jones, Engineers
- Lt. Howard Kennedy, Engineers
- Capt. Frank Clifton Little, Inf.
- Lt. Haydon Stratton Lyle, Mounted Rifles
- Lt. Donald Bain MacCaskill, Inf.
- Lt. Keith Campbell MacGowan, Inf.
- Capt. James Frederick Stewart Marshall, Army Medical Corps
- Lt. Leslie Martin, Inf.
- Lt. James Mavor, Mounted Rifles
- Lt. Arthur William May, Inf.
- Rev. Thomas McCarthy, Canadian Chaplains Service
- Lt. Merrick Rennie McCracken, Engineers
- Lt. James Maxwell McIlquham, Canadian Field Arty.
- Lt. Robert McIntyre, Inf.
- Lt. Alfred Edward McKay, Inf.
- Lt. James Day McKeown, Canadian Field Arty.
- Lt. Joseph Graham McKnight, Inf.
- Lt. Brydone de Blois Millidge, Canadian Field Arty.
- Capt. William Gordon Moffatt, Inf.
- Capt. Thomas Williamson Moore, Army Medical Corps
- Lt. William Cedric Nicholson, Machine Gun Corps
- Tmp Lt. Fleming Pinkston O'Reilly, Machine Gun Corps
- Lt. Beecher Doran Poyser, Mounted Rifles
- Capt. Henry Frederick Preston, Army Medical Corps
- Lt. Brian Lee Reid, Railway Troops
- Capt. Walter Hepburn Scott, Army Medical Corps
- Lt. James Gordon Searles, Machine Gun Corps
- Lt. Raymond Sellar, Inf.
- Lt. Bernard Shipton MM Mounted Rifles
- Lt. Charles Dayrell Shreve, Canadian Field Arty.
- Lt. Edmund George Alpheus Smart, Inf.
- Lt. William Henry Smith, Railway Troops
- Lt. Rolsa Eric Smythe, Inf.
- Rev. Thomas Hudson Stewart, Canadian Chaplains Service
- Capt. Ray Farquhar Studd, Inf.
- Lt. Howard Sutherland, Inf.
- Lt. Albert Ernest Thorne, Inf.
- Tmp Capt. John William Tipton, Inf.
- Lt. John Arnold Trewhitt, Canadian Field Arty.
- Lt. Ray Hargreave Warne, Mounted Rifles
- Lt. William Chester Warren, Inf.
- Capt. Ernest Coulter Whitehouse, Canadian Army Medical Corps
- Capt. Le Roy Zimmerman Wilson, Railway Troops
- Lt. Fred Campbell Young, Acting Battery, Machine Gun Corps
- C.S. Maj. James Campbell Hutchison, Inf.
- C.S. Maj. John Nash, Mounted Rifles
- Lt. Harry McNeven Alexander, Inf.
- Lt. Robert Andrews, Mounted Rifles Battalion
- Lt. Gordon Henry Applegath, Inf.
- Lt. Harold Lynn Atto, Mounted Rifles Battalion
- Capt. Edwin Godfrey Phipps Baker, Inf.
- Lt. John Balfour, Cyclist Battalion
- Capt. Leonard Halliday Bertram, Inf.
- Lt. Wilford Edward Bull, Engineers
- Lt. Harry Maxwell Camp, Inf.
- Lt. Glidden Campbell, Inf.
- Lt. Leonard Proctor Chalmers, Inf.
- Lt. Herbert Read Christie, Engineers
- Lt. Walter Findlay Clarke, Royal Canadian Horse Arty.
- Lt. Joseph Patrick Connolly, Machine Gun Corps
- Lt. Louis Auguste Coulin, Inf.
- Lt. Vernon Bland Crothers, Dragoons
- Lt. Gordon Charles Davidson, Mounted Rifles Battalion
- Lt. Tempest Carroll McPherson St. Etienne de Wolf, Inf.
- Capt. Edgar Douglas, Army Medical Corps
- Lt. Clarence Johnston Dryden, Inf.
- Lt. William Waugh Dunlop, Inf.
- Lt. George Hendry Ferguson, Engineers
- Lt. William Frank Findlay, Inf.
- Capt. Arthur Douglas Fisken, Inf.
- Lt. Cecil John French, Machine Gun Corps
- Lt. Harry Roy Gifford, Mounted Rifles Battalion
- Lt. Charles Victor Grantham, Machine Gun Corps
- Capt. James Hamilton, Inf.
- Lt. Charles Edwin Fulcher Hiscocks, Inf.
- Lt. George Hobson, Machine Gun Corps
- Lt. William Gilbert Humphries, Field Arty.
- Lt. Charles Meldrum Inglis, Inf.
- Capt. Austin Dwight Irvine, Army Medical Corps
- Lt. Hector John Roderick Jackson, Engineers
- Lt. Harry Jardine, Field Arty.
- Capt. Gordon Leigh Jepson, Army Medical Corps
- Lt. Walter Wallace Johnson, Inf.
- Capt. Arthur Ellis Jones, Labour Battalion
- Lt. Joseph John Kavanagh, Inf.
- Lt. Arthur Rubin Kilborn, Inf.
- Lt. Robert Duff Kinmond, Engineers
- Lt. Harold Oakley Leach, Machine Gun Corps
- Lt. Gerald Charles Huntingdon Lindsell, Inf.
- Lt. Alexander William Logie, Mounted Rifles Battalion
- Lt. James Boyd Maclachlan, Garrison Arty.
- Lt. Alexander MacLean, Field Arty.
- Lt. Norman Philips Macleod, Garrison Arty.
- Capt. James Grant MacNeill, Army Medical Corps
- Lt. James Forrest Currie Maunder, Field Arty.
- Lt. Roderick George May, Lord Strathcona's Horse
- Lt. Vivian-Stewart Cass McClenaghan, Engineers
- Lt. Ernest Victor McKague, Cyclist Corps
- Lt. Donald Grant McNeil, Machine Gun Corps
- Lt. Harry Lyall McPherson, Field Arty.
- Lt. Charles Edmund McRae, Inf.
- Capt. William Blight Megloughlin, Inf.
- Capt. John McIntosh Millar, Inf.
- Lt. Leslie Howard Millar, Mounted Rifles Battalion
- Lt. Bernhard Coeure Montagnon, Machine Gun Corps
- Lt. George Murray, Inf.
- Tmp Capt. William Henry Douglas Murray, Railway Construction Company
- Lt. Arthur Nicholls, Royal Canadian Reg.
- Lt. Rupert Austin Orme, Inf.
- Lt. Richmond Archie Payne, Inf.
- C.S. Maj. Charles Peacock, Inf.
- Tmp Lt. George Peck, Railway Construction Company
- Lt. Maurice Arthur Pope, Engineers
- Lt. Sidney Quinton, Inf.
- Lt. Edward Leonard Rainboth, Machine Gun Corps
- Capt. Theodore Hampton Oswald Rayward, Inf.
- Lt. Charles Stanley Reed-Riches, Army Service Corps
- Capt. Harold Roche, Field Arty.
- Lt. Herbert Mackenzie Ross, Inf.
- Capt. John Horace Roy, Inf.
- Lt. Hugh McMaster Scott, Inf.
- Capt. Wesley Herbert Secord, Army Medical Corps
- Capt. William Ewing Sinclair, Army Medical Corps
- Lt. Warren Russell Skey, Field Arty.
- Capt. John Onion Slaght, Inf.
- Lt. Sydney Welton Thurber, Inf.
- Lt. William Vernon, Inf.
- Lt. William Frederick Welch, Inf.
- Lt. Leonard Alfred Welsh, Lord Strathcona's Horse
- Capt. John Douglas Young, Inf.

=== Newfoundland Force ===
- Lt. Stanley Charles Goodyear, Newfoundland Reg.
- 2nd Lt. Gerald Joseph Whitty, Newfoundland Reg.

=== New Zealand Force ===
- Capt. Forbes Herbert Anderson, Army Service Corps
- Capt. Norman Annabell, Headquarters, Engineers
- Lt. Ralph FitzRoger Bidwell Beetham, Mounted Rifles
- Lt. Ralph John Black, Engineers
- 2nd Lt. Guy Bridgeman, Arty.
- Capt. William Gillers Borrie New Zealand Medical Corps
- Capt. David Bruce, Pioneer Battalion
- Capt. John Connor New Zealand Medical Corps
- Lt. James Type Dallinger, 1st Battalion, Wellington Reg.
- Capt. Harry Delamere Dansey, Pioneer Battalion
- Lt. Arthur Gordon Dean, 1st Battalion, Canterbury Reg.
- Capt. Robert Wakelin Dunn, Arty.
- Capt. James Evans, Inf.
- Lt. Alfred Onslow Glasse, Engineers
- Capt. Kenneth Farquharson Gordon, New Zealand Medical Corps
- 2nd Lt. Fritz Stanley Goulding, New Zealand Rifle Brigade
- 2nd Lt. Gordon Verney Gow, New Zealand Rifle Brigade
- Q.M. and Hon. Lt. Roland Justice Hill, Otago Reg.
- Lt. Christopher Ingram, Auckland Reg.
- Capt. James Gordon Jeffery, Arty.
- Capt. Frederick Noel Johns New Zealand Medical Corps
- Lt. Henry Mark Keesing, New Zealand Rifle Brigade
- Lt. Edward Levien, Mounted Rifles Reg.
- Lt. Gerald Lyon, Field Arty.
- Lt. Ewen John McGregor, Machine Gun Corps
- Capt. Hector Campbell MacKenzie, Machine Gun Corps
- Rev. Walter McClean, New Zealand Chaplains' Dept.
- Capt. Cyril Henry Molloy, Otago Reg.
- Capt. Bruce Haultain Morison, Wellington Reg.
- Capt. Thomas Wyville Leonard Rutherford, Canterbury Reg.
- 2nd Lt. George Albert Tuck, Auckland Reg.
- Capt. Joseph Kendrick Venables, New Zealand Medical Corps
- 2nd Lt. Walter George Wainscott, Engineers
- Capt. William Huatahi Walker, Pioneer Battalion
- Capt. Malcolm McPherson Watt, Otago Reg.
- Lt. Alfred Thomas White, Wellington Reg.
- Capt. Thomas Martin Wilkes, Rifle Brigade
- Capt. Newman Robert Wilson, Canterbury Reg.
- 2nd Lt. Charles Ronald McKenzie, New Zealand Field Arty.
- Lt. Malcolm Carmichael Milne, Mounted Rifles
- 2nd Lt. Ernest Horton Picot, New Zealand Machine Gun Corps
- Lt. Kenneth James Tait, Mounted Rifles
- Capt. Rex Carrington Brewster FRCS Medical Corps
- 2nd Lt. Allan Farquhar, Canterbury Reg.
- 2nd Lt. Charles Albert Gray, Canterbury Mounted Rifles Reg.
- Capt. George Herbert Gray, Canterbury Reg.
- 2nd Lt. Randolph Norman Gray, Canterbury Reg.
- Lt. John Nelmes Hines, Otago Reg.
- Lt. Alfred Cecil Christian Hunter, Canterbury Reg.
- Lt. Hugh Johnston, Canterbury Reg.
- Lt. David McAuley, Otago Reg.
- Capt. Robert Francis Mitchell, Otago Mounted Rifles
- Lt. Caro James Pierce, Wellington Mounted Rifles Reg.

=== South African Force ===
- Tmp Capt. Philip Harold Guise Brown, Inf.
- Tmp Paymaster and Hon. Lt. Alfred George Charter, Rifles
- Tmp Lt. Alfred Edgar Court, Rifles
- Capt. Edward Arthur Davies, Inf.
- Lt. Percival Henry Ellis, Inf.
- Tmp Capt. Alexander Buchan Fyffe, South African Service Corps
- Tmp 2nd Lt. William Edward Harris, Inf.
- Tmp Capt. Samuel Heath, South African Service Corps (East African)
- Capt. Ernest Hill, South African Medical Corps
- Tmp Capt. Edmund Mullinger Jarvis, Veterinary Corps
- Tmp Capt. Simon Frederick Kos, Engineers (Wireless Section)
- Lt. William Maclean, Inf.
- Tmp Capt. Francis McEwan Mitchell, Inf.
- Capt. Duncan Macmillan, Motor Cyclist Corps
- Tmp Capt. Benjamin Thomas Kelly Markham, South African Service Corps
- 2nd Lt. Samuel Marshall, Signal Company
- 2nd Lt. Percy Charles Neille, Inf.
- Lt. Robert Okell, Engineer Troops
- Tmp Lt. Immers de Maurigsault Overbeck, South African Service Corps
- Tmp Capt. Arthur Llewellyn Pepper, South African Defence Force
- Lt. Harry Rissik, South African Forces
- 2nd Lt. Wilfred Frank Steedman, Inf., attd. Intel Dept.
- Tmp Lt. James Gordon Stewart, Arty.
- Lt. William Twist, Engineers Troops
- Battery Sergeant Major Arthur James Wardill, Arty.
- R.S. Maj. Robert Wells, Inf.
- Tmp Capt. William Grahame Wood, Inf.
- Tmp Capt. William Howorth Wood, Engineers

== Awarded a Bar to the Military Cross (MC*) ==
- Tmp 2nd Lt. Robert Edgar Herring MC Army Service Corps
- Lt. Alfred Cyril Whitworth Hobson MC Royal Field Arty.
- Lt. Edward Percy Noel Jones MC Royal Field Arty.
- Tmp Capt. Robert Briffault MC RAMC
- Tmp Capt. Maurice Smith Bryce MC RAMC
- Tmp Capt. George Beatty Burwell MC RAMC
- Tmp Capt. Eric Cornwallis Day MC Shropshire Light Inf.
- Tmp Capt. Gerald Hugh de la Pasture MC King's African Rifles
- Lt. Edwin Arthur Eden MC Royal Arty.
- Tmp Capt. Charles Hugh Emerson MC Lincolnshire Reg.
- Tmp Lt. Harold Charles de Courcy Evans MC King's African Rifles
- Capt. Gerard William Hodgkinson MC Yeomanry and Royal Flying Corps
- Lt. Edward Haughton James MC Yeomanry, attd. Dorsetshire Reg.
- Capt. Stephen Grey Latham MC Northamptonshire Reg.
- Tmp Capt. James MacGregor MC RAMC
- Rev. Canon Arthur Edwin Ross MC Royal Army Chaplains' Dept.
- Capt. Walter Somerville Scott MC Lancashire Fusiliers, attd. Royal Flying Corps
- 2nd Lt. William Skeat MC Essex Reg.
- Tmp Lt. Maurice Strode MC Royal West Surrey Reg.
- 2nd Lt. George William Symes MC York & Lancaster Reg., attd. Machine Gun Corps
- Tmp Capt. Bernard Charles Tennent MC RAMC
- Lt. George Gustavus Walker MC Scots Guards
- Capt. Charles Louis Waters MC Royal Berkshire Reg.
- Lt. Arthur Cecil Willison MC Nottinghamshire and Derbyshire Reg.
- Lt. Christopher Geoffrey Woolner MC Royal Engineers
- Lt. Jehu Fosbrooke Gerrard Aubin MC Durham Light Inf.
- Lt. Reginald Andrew Bateman MC Manchester Reg., attd. Royal Warwickshire Reg.
- Tmp Capt. Robert Ernest Beckerson MC Norfolk Reg.
- Tmp Lt. Wilfred Dennes MC Royal Field Arty.
- Lt. Edward Edwards MC Lincolnshire Reg.
- Capt. Austin Gardner MC Essex Reg.
- 2nd Lt. John King George MC Gloucestershire Reg.
- Tmp Capt. Albert Ernest Haynes MC Royal Field Arty.
- 2nd Lt. John Purslow Howells MC Royal West Surrey Reg.
- Lt. Frederick Chater Jack MC Royal Field Arty.
- Lt. Thomas Jenkins MC Royal Field Arty.
- 2nd Lt. Charles Kelly MC London Reg.
- 2nd Lt. Russell Medley Leake MC North Lancashire Reg.
- Tmp 2nd Lt. John Winter Little MC Border Reg.
- Lt. Maurice Stanley Lush MC Royal Garrison Arty.
- Tmp 2nd Lt. Sidney Albert Macey MC Devonshire Reg.
- 2nd Lt. Francis James Charles Marshall MC Devonshire Reg.
- Lt. Frederick William Broadbent Maufe MC Royal Field Arty.
- Tmp Lt. Albert Edward Odell MC General List, attd. Royal Engineers
- Tmp Capt. Arthur John Hinkson Patten MC Norfolk Reg.
- Lt. Winthrop Pyemont MC Royal Engineers
- Tmp Surgeon James Ness McBean Ross MC RN attd. Royal Marines
- 2nd Lt. Sydney John Cenlivres Russell MC Border Reg.
- Capt. Robert Bell Stewart MC RAMC
- 2nd Lt. Bernard Watson Stirling MC Royal Field Arty.
- Tmp 2nd Lt. Joseph Summerville MC Yorkshire Reg.
- Tmp Capt. Francis Ruthven Thornton MC RAMC
- Lt. Owen Murton Wales MC South Wales Borderers
- 2nd Lt. George Sholto Ripley Webb MC Royal Berkshire Reg., attd. Trench Mortar Battery
- Tmp Lt. John Wells MC Devonshire Reg.
- 2nd Lt. William Gladstone Wylie MC Durham Light Inf.
- Capt. Cuthbert Delaval Shafto Agassiz MC RAMC
- Lt. John Samuel Aikman MC Argyll and Sutherland Highlanders
- 2nd Lt. George Henry Garstin Anderson MC Rifle Brigade
- Tmp Lt. Thomas Geoffrey Lyon Ashwell MC Rifle Brigade
- 2nd Lt. Felix Charles Baker MC London Reg.
- 2nd Lt.-Stuart Gordon Beer MC London Reg.
- Tmp Capt. Arthur Joseph Blake MC RAMC
- Capt. Richard Bryans MC Shropshire Light Inf.
- Tmp Capt. Edward Alexander Chisholm MC Royal Field Arty.
- Lt. William Hofmeyr Craib MC Royal Field Arty.
- Lt. Thomas Henry Clifford Davis MC Royal Field Arty.
- Capt. Richard Day MC Royal Field Arty.
- Tmp Capt. Harold Anthony Denison MC Kings Royal Rifle Corps
- Capt. Eric Alfred Charles Fazan MC RAMC
- Lt. Oswald Spencer Francis MC Royal Berkshire Reg.
- Lt. Arnold Fraser-Campbell MC Argyll and Sutherland Highlanders
- Tmp Capt. Harry Percy Bright-Gough MC Welsh Reg.
- Capt. John Frederick Hodges MC Royal Irish Fusiliers
- Lt. Claud Mitchell Hughes-Games MC Gloucestershire Reg.
- Rev. Joseph Wellington Hunkin MC Royal Army Chaplains' Dept.
- Lt. William Stewart Ironside MC Royal Field Arty.
- Lt. Henry Harris Jago MC Devonshire Reg.
- Lt. Edward William Francis Jephson MC Royal Field Arty.
- Tmp Capt. Percy Lewis Jones MC Royal Garrison Arty.
- Lt. William Knight MC Essex Reg.
- Lt. Conrad Lally MC Royal Flying Corps
- Lt. Godfrey Frank Mackwood Ling MC West Yorkshire Reg.
- Tmp Capt. James Wallace Macfarlane MC RAMC
- Lt. Loudoun James MacLean MC Royal Engineers, and Royal Flying Corps
- Tmp Capt. Edward Leslie Marshall MC Royal Inniskilling Fusiliers
- Capt. Samuel McCausland MC RAMC
- Lt. James Kenneth McConnel DSO MC Hussars
- Capt. Austin Timaeus Miller MC Nottinghamshire and Derbyshire Reg.
- Tmp Lt. Vincent Newton Moss MC East Kent Reg.
- Tmp Lt. Clarence Mumford MC South Wales Borderers
- 2nd Lt. Randolph Nicholson MC Royal Field Arty.
- Lt. Basil Conquest Pascoe MC Rifle Brigade
- Tmp Lt. Harold Edward Pope MC Royal Garrison Arty.
- 2nd Lt. Henry Godden Rerrie MC York & Lancaster Reg.
- Lt. Derek Charles Houghton Richardson MC Lancers
- Tmp Lt. Abraham Rothfield MC Durham Light Inf.
- Lt. Hugh Rowlands MC London Reg.
- Capt. Desmond Henry Sykes Somerville MC South Wales Borderers
- Lt. Aubrey Causton Strachan MC Royal Field Arty.
- Tmp Lt. Peter Thompson MC Northumberland Fusiliers
- Capt. Joseph Stephen Wallace MC RAMC
- Tmp Capt. William Edward Walter-Symons MC Royal Garrison Arty.
- Tmp Capt. Philip Ernest Williams MC Royal Welsh Fusiliers

=== Australian Imperial Force ===
- Capt. David MacDonald Steele MC Australian Army Medical Corps

=== Canadian Force ===
- Capt. Gerald Gardiner Anglin MC Inf.
- Capt. Edward James Clark MC Mounted Rifles
- Lt. Alfred Henry Cowie MC Inf.
- Capt. The Hon. Francis Egerton Grosvenor MC Inf.
- Capt. Melville Mason Hart MC Mounted Rifles
- Capt. Donald Bruce Martyn MC Inf.
- Lt. Harry Leonard Nowell Salmon MC Inf.
- Lt. Lewis Younger MC Inf.

=== Newfoundland Force ===
- Capt. Reginald Grant Paterson MC Newfoundland Reg.

== Awarded a Second Bar to the Military Cross (MC**) ==
- Lt. Edward Budd MC* Irish Guards
- Tmp Capt. Fred Roland Berridge MC* Northamptonshire Reg.
- Tmp Capt. George D'Rastrik Carr MC* RAMC
- Sub-Lt. Walter Kilroy Harris MC* Royal Naval Volunteer Reserve
- Tmp Lt. Victor Cadifor Hilditch MC* Royal Field Arty.
- Tmp Lt. Charles Hubert Anthony Huxtable MC* Royal Field Arty.
- Tmp Lt. Harold Arthur Redding MC* Suffolk Reg.
- Tmp Capt. John Alexander Walbeoffe-Wilson MC* Middlesex Reg.
- 2nd Lt. Alfred Clarence Youdale MC* Royal Flying Corps
