= Gibson Les Paul =

Solid-body electric guitar

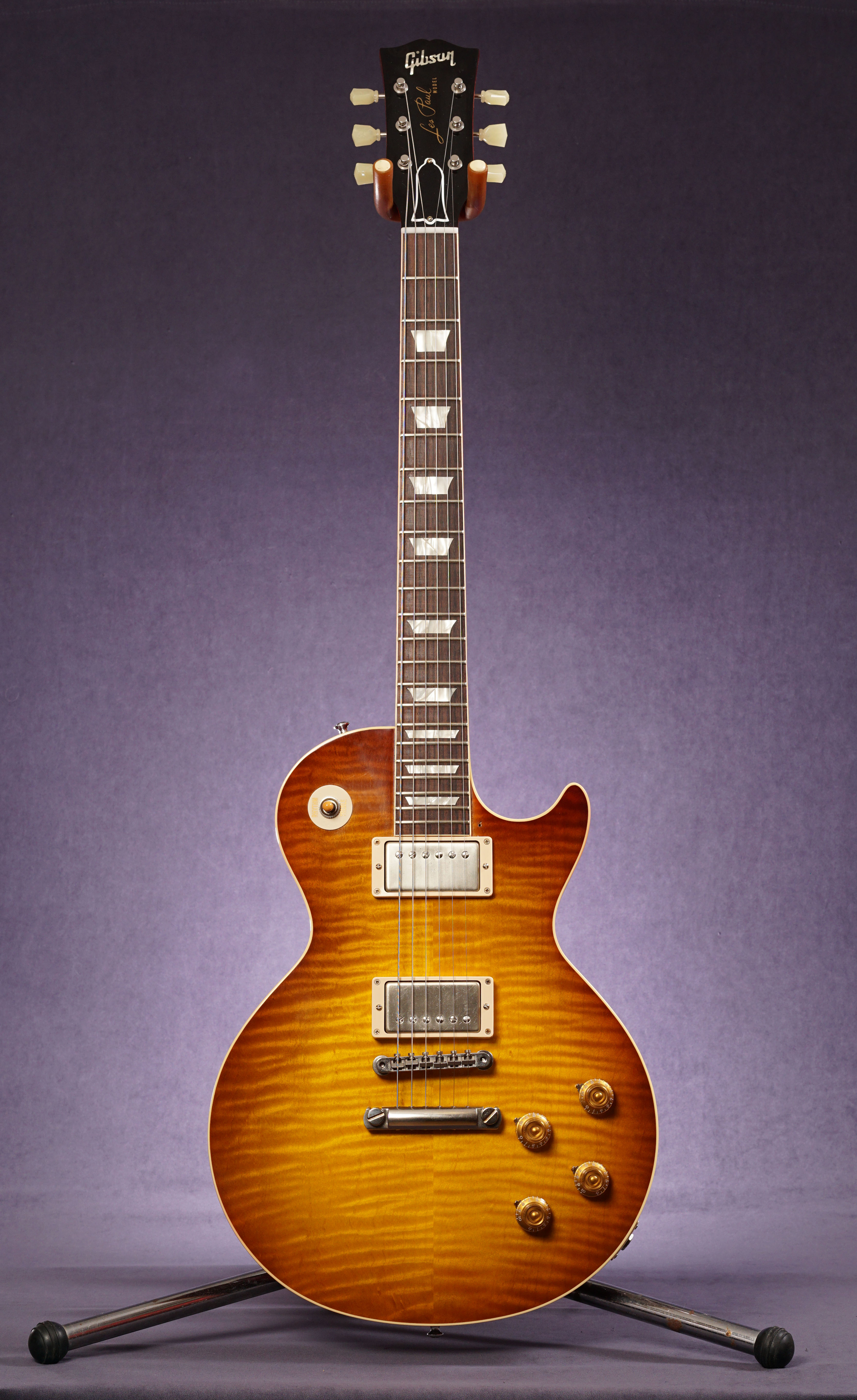
- Gibson Les Paul
- Manufacturer: Gibson
- Period: 1952–1960; 1961–1963 (in SG form); 1968–present

Construction
- Body type: Solid, Semi-hollow, Chambered
- Neck joint: Set-in neck
- Scale: 24.75 in 628.65 mm

Woods
- Body: Mahogany (often with a maple top); Swamp ash (rare)
- Neck: Usually mahogany Maple
- Fretboard: Usually Rosewood; Ebony; Maple; Richlite

Hardware
- Bridge: Usually Tune-O-Matic
- Pickup(s): Usually 2 humbuckers 2 P-90s; 3 humbuckers

Colors available
- Originally gold; many other colors subsequently produced.

The Gibson Les Paul is a solid-body electric guitar that was first sold by the Gibson Guitar Corporation in 1952. The guitar was designed by factory manager John Huis and his team with input from and endorsement by guitarist Les Paul. Its typical design features a solid mahogany body with a carved maple top and a single cutaway, a mahogany set-in neck with a rosewood fretboard, two pickups with independent volume and tone controls, and a stoptail bridge, although variants exist.

The Les Paul was originally offered with a gold finish and two P-90 pickups. In 1957, humbucking pickups were added, along with sunburst finishes in 1958. The 1958–1960 sunburst Les Paul, today one of the best-known electric guitar types in the world, was considered a commercial failure, with low production and sales. For 1961, the Les Paul was redesigned into what is now known as the Gibson SG. The original single-cutaway, carved top bodystyle was re-introduced in 1968. The Les Paul has been produced in many versions and editions since. Along with Fender's Telecaster and Stratocaster, it was one of the first mass-produced electric solid-body guitars. Due to their versatility, Les Paul electric guitars have been used in a wide range of music genres, including rock, country, pop, soul, rhythm and blues, blues, jazz, reggae, punk, and heavy metal.

== History ==
=== Origins (1950–1952) ===
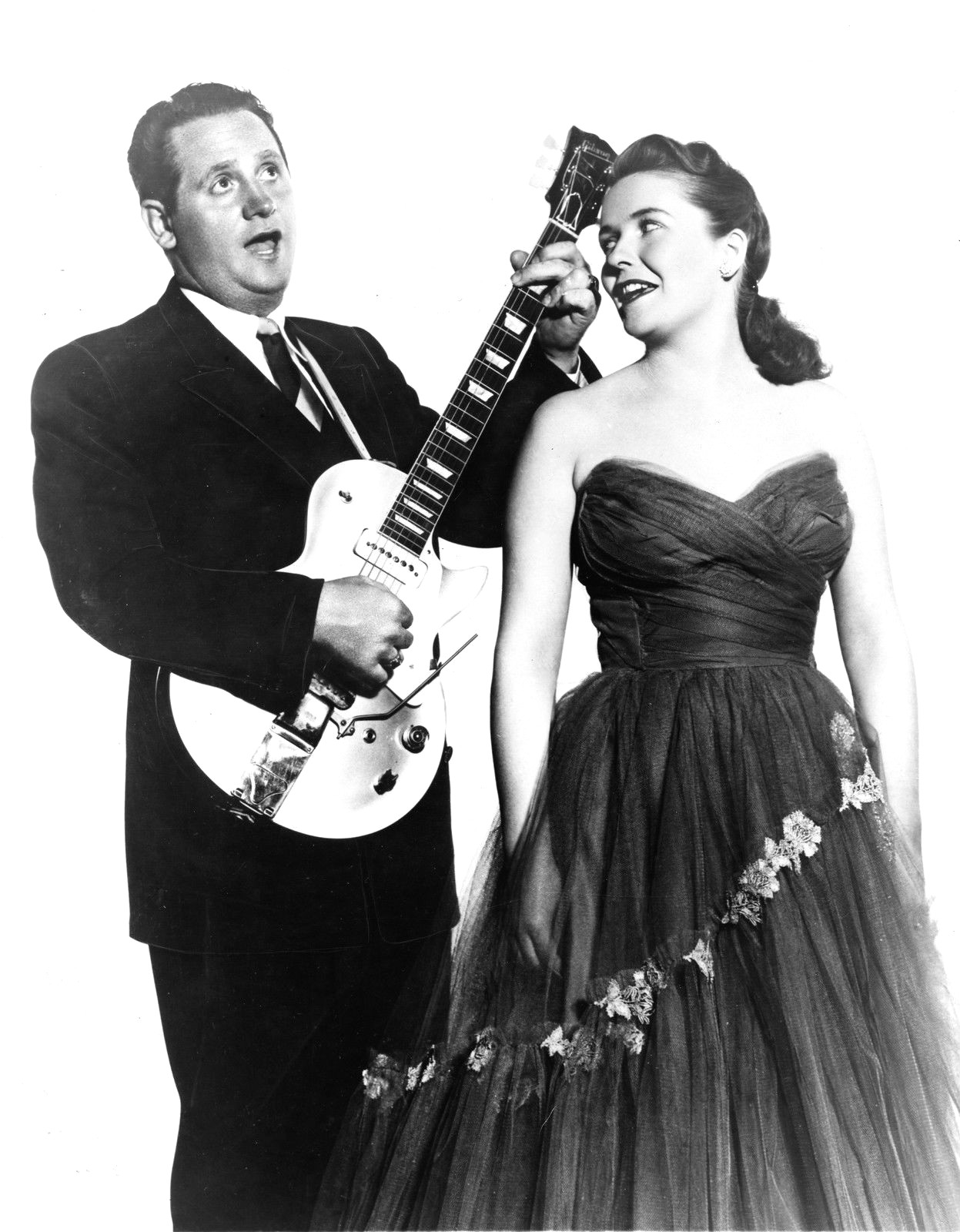
Les Paul playing his signature model with Mary Ford in 1954

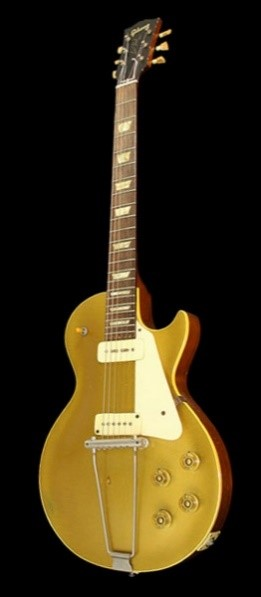
Goldtop Les Paul with the 1952-style trapeze-style bridge

In 1950, the Fender Esquire and Fender Broadcaster (later renamed the Fender Telecaster) were introduced to the musical market and solid-body electric guitars became a public craze. In reaction to market demand, Gibson Guitar president Ted McCarty brought guitarist Les Paul into the company as a consultant.

Les Paul was a respected innovator who had been experimenting with guitar design for years. He had hand-built a solid-body guitar prototype nicknamed "The Log", named after the pine block running through the middle of the guitar whose width and depth are a little more than the width of the fretboard. Conventional hollow guitar sides or "wings" were added for shape. In 1945 or 1946, Paul had approached Gibson with "The Log" prototype, but his design was rejected.

In 1951, McCarty and his team at Gibson began work on what would eventually become the Les Paul Model. Early prototypes of the Les Paul model are very similar to the final version. The new Les Paul guitar was to be an expensive, well-made instrument in accordance with Gibson's reputation at the time, and distinct from growing rival guitar manufacturer Fender's models.

McCarty approached Les Paul for the right to imprint the musician's name on the headstock with the intention of increasing sales; in 1951, Gibson presented Paul a nearly finished instrument for approval. McCarty stated that design discussions with Les Paul were limited to the tailpiece and the fitting of a maple cap over the mahogany body for increased density and sustain, which Les Paul had requested reversed. However, this reversal would have caused the guitar to become too heavy, and Paul's request was refused. Paul states that the original Custom should have had the maple cap and the Goldtop was to be all mahogany. The Custom did not appear on the market for another two years following the introduction of the Goldtop; it is possible that Gibson had planned a full model range of guitars (with a roll-out over the course of several years) at the time when initial specifications were being set. Les Paul's contributions to the guitar line bearing his name were more than cosmetic; for example, Paul specified that the guitar be offered in a gold finish, not only for flashiness, but to emphasize the high quality of the Gibson Les Paul instrument. Later Les Paul models included flame maple (tiger stripe) and "quilted" maple tops, again in contrast to the competing Fender line's range of car-like custom color finishes.

The 1952 Les Paul featured a mahogany body with a one-inch-thick maple cap, a mahogany neck with a rosewood fretboard, two P-90 single coil pickups, and a one-piece, 'trapeze'-style bridge/tailpiece with strings fitted under (instead of over) a steel stop-bar. (Note: In the summer of 1952, Gibson Les Paul Goldtop was priced at US$209 (equivalent to $2,534 in 2025).)

The guitar made its public debut when Paul used it onstage in June 1952 at the Paramount Theatre in New York. On July 24, 1952, at a special musicians clinic at the Waldorf-Astoria hotel, it was previewed by prominent guitarists such as Tiger Haynes, George Barnes, Mundell Lowe, Tony Mottola, and Billy Mure.

=== Mid-1950s (1953–1957) ===
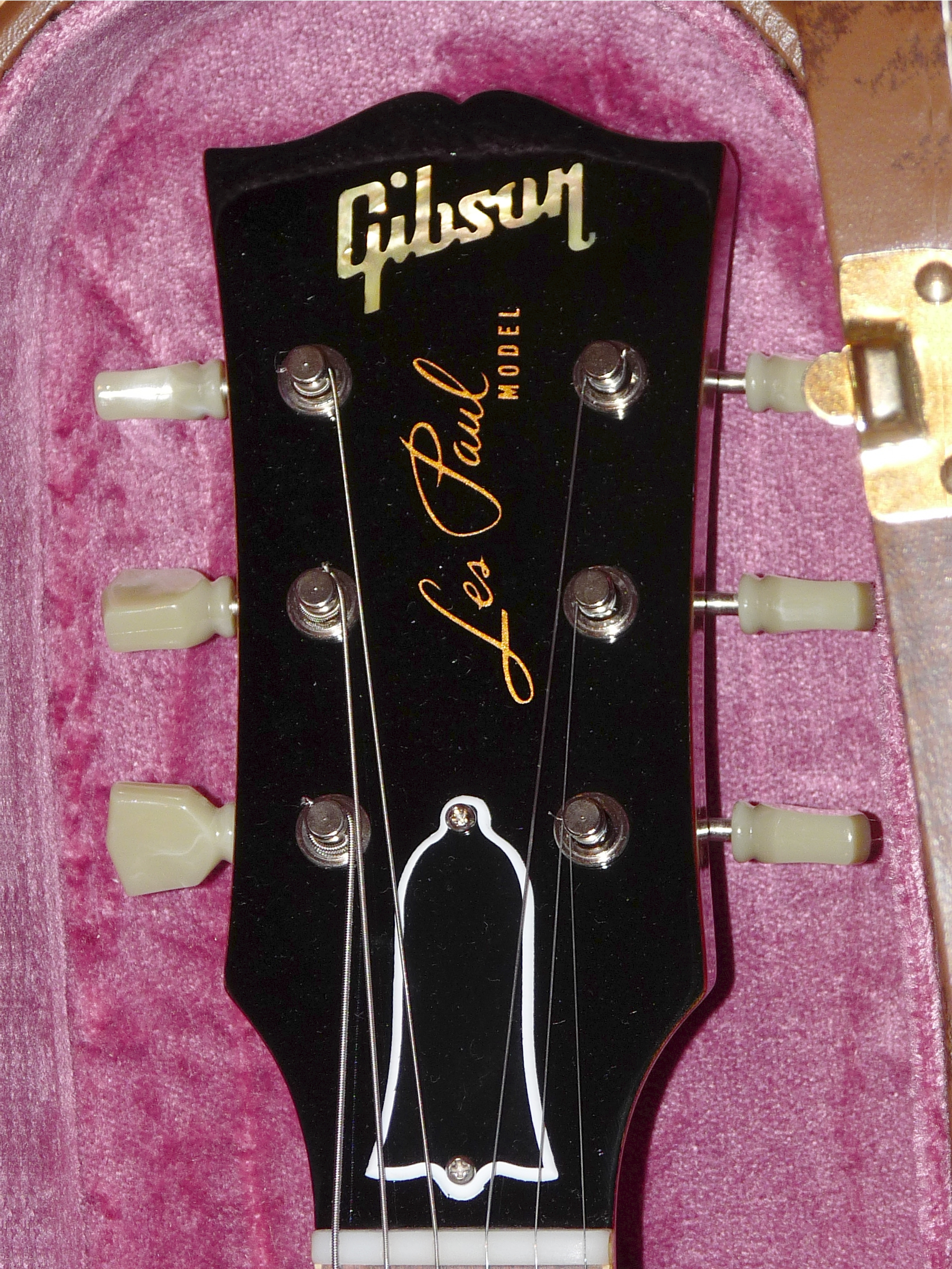
Les Paul logo on headstock

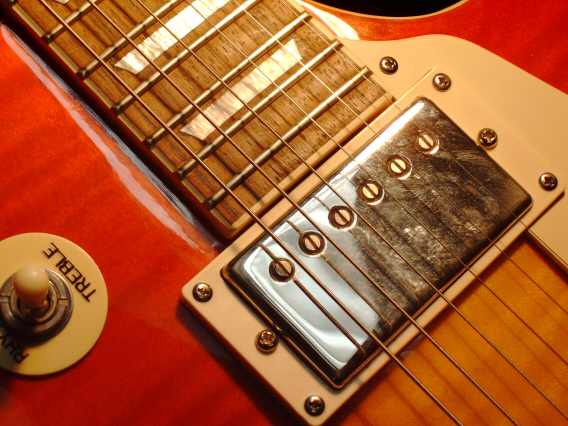
"Patent Applied For" (PAF) pickups on a Les Paul Standard

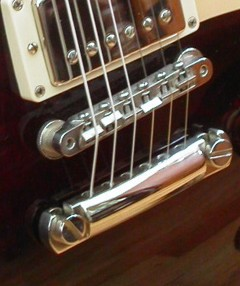
Tune-o-matic bridge with stopbar tailpiece

A second Les Paul model was introduced in 1953. Called the Les Paul Custom, this black guitar with gold-plated hardware was dubbed the "Black Beauty". New bridge and tailpiece designs were rapidly adopted. The one-piece "wraparound" stopbar was introduced in 1953. The following year saw the introduction of the fully-adjustable Tune-o-matic bridge. The Goldtop and Custom models continued without significant changes until 1957. New humbucker pickups designed by Seth Lover in 1955 debuted on Les Pauls in 1957 and P-90 pickups were no longer offered. These pickups carried the markings "PAF", for "Patent Applied For" (referring to U.S. patent 2,896,491). This innovation in pickups became the flagship pickup design most associated with Gibson. Many other guitar companies followed suit, outfitting their electrics with versions of the humbucking pickup.

=== Sunburst failure and resurgence (1958–1968) ===
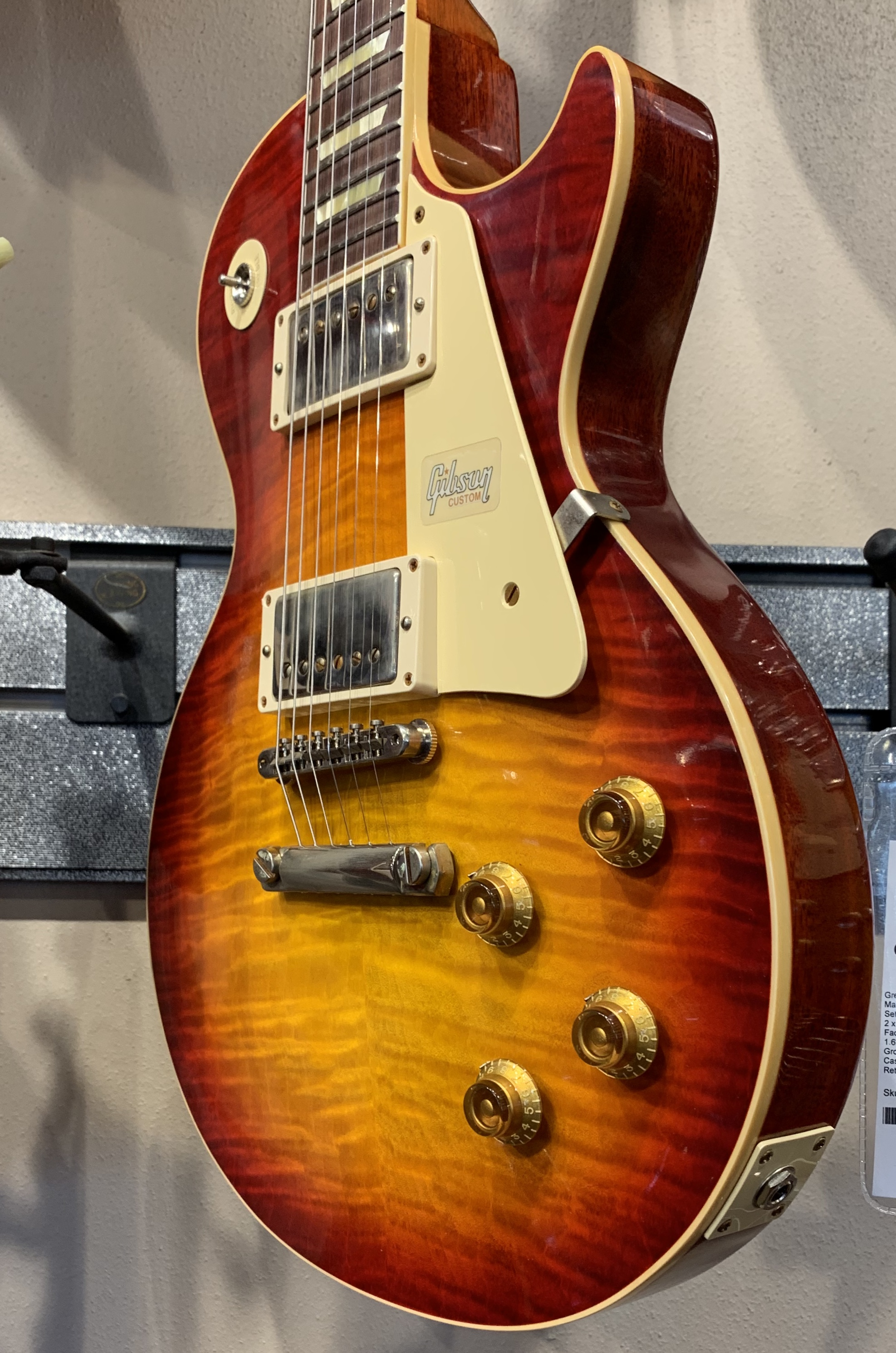
1959 Les Paul Standard Reissue

In 1958, the Les Paul saw its first major design change. A new model, called the Standard, retained most features of the 1957 Goldtop. However, Standards featured a cherry-red sunburst finish. These guitars were priced higher than the Goldtop models, but lower than the Customs. At this time, Gibson instruments were marketed toward an older, jazz-oriented audience rather than young burgeoning guitarists. As a result, over the three-year period of production, only about 1,700 Standards were made.

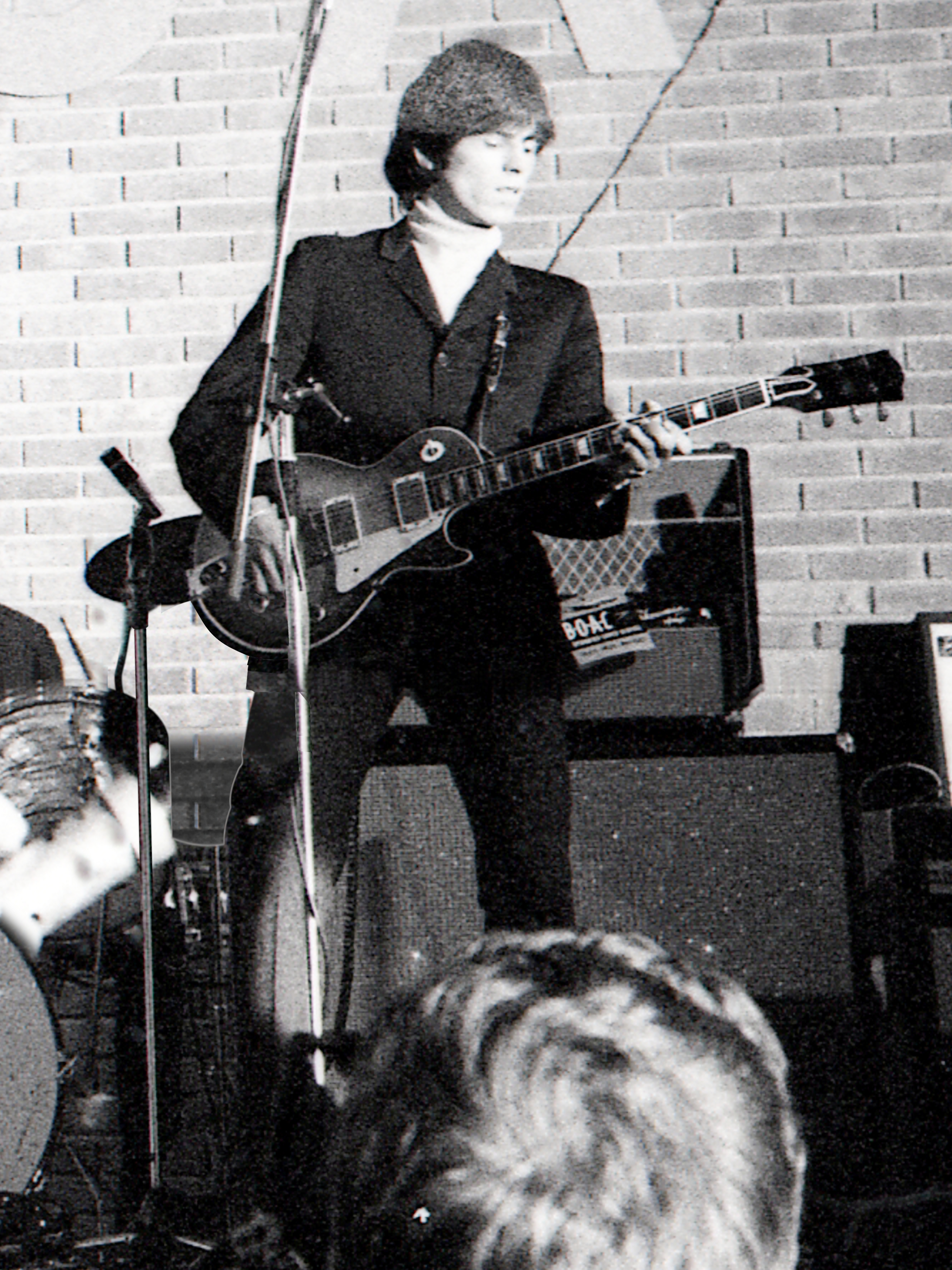
Keith Richards (1965)

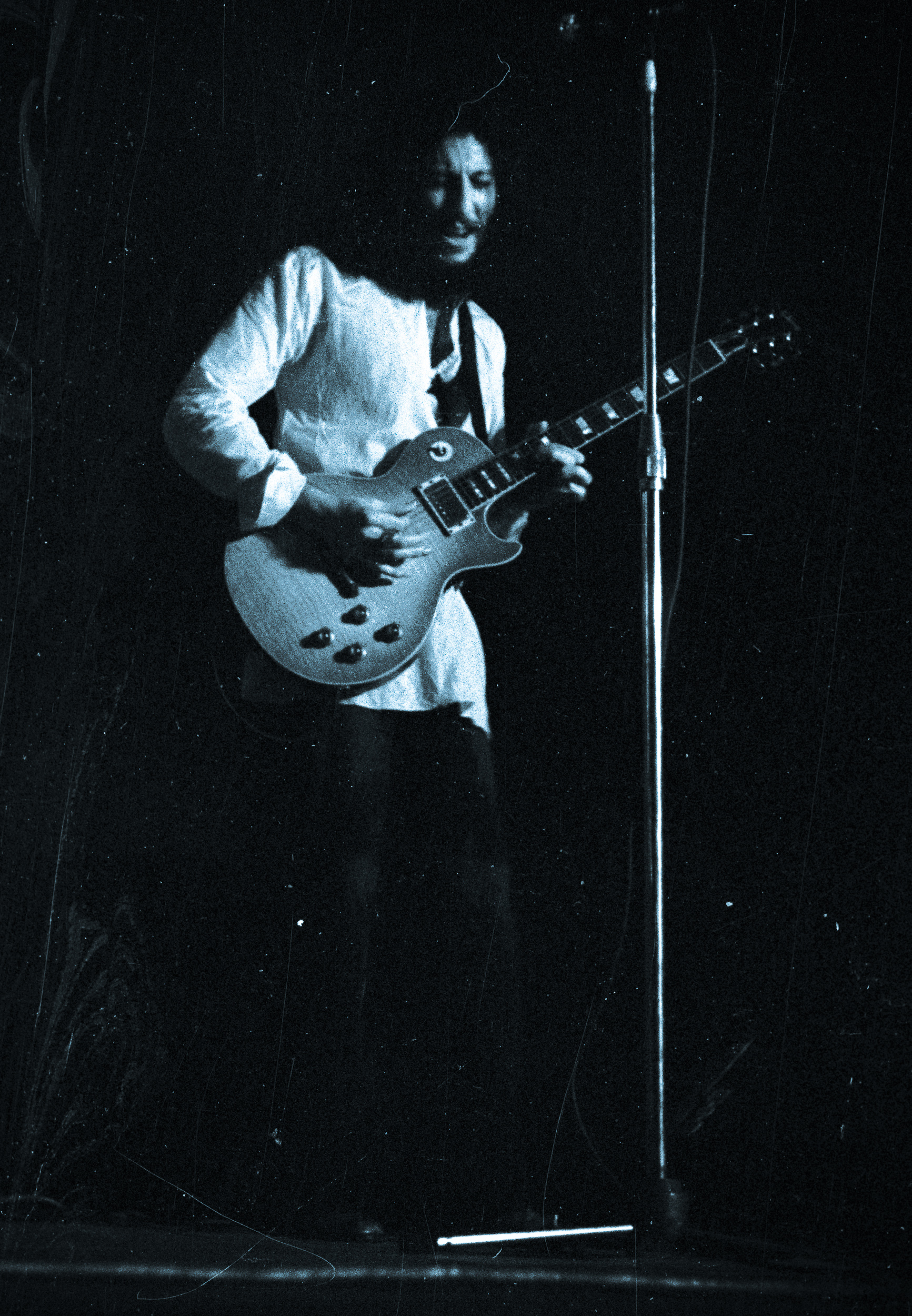
Peter Green (1970)

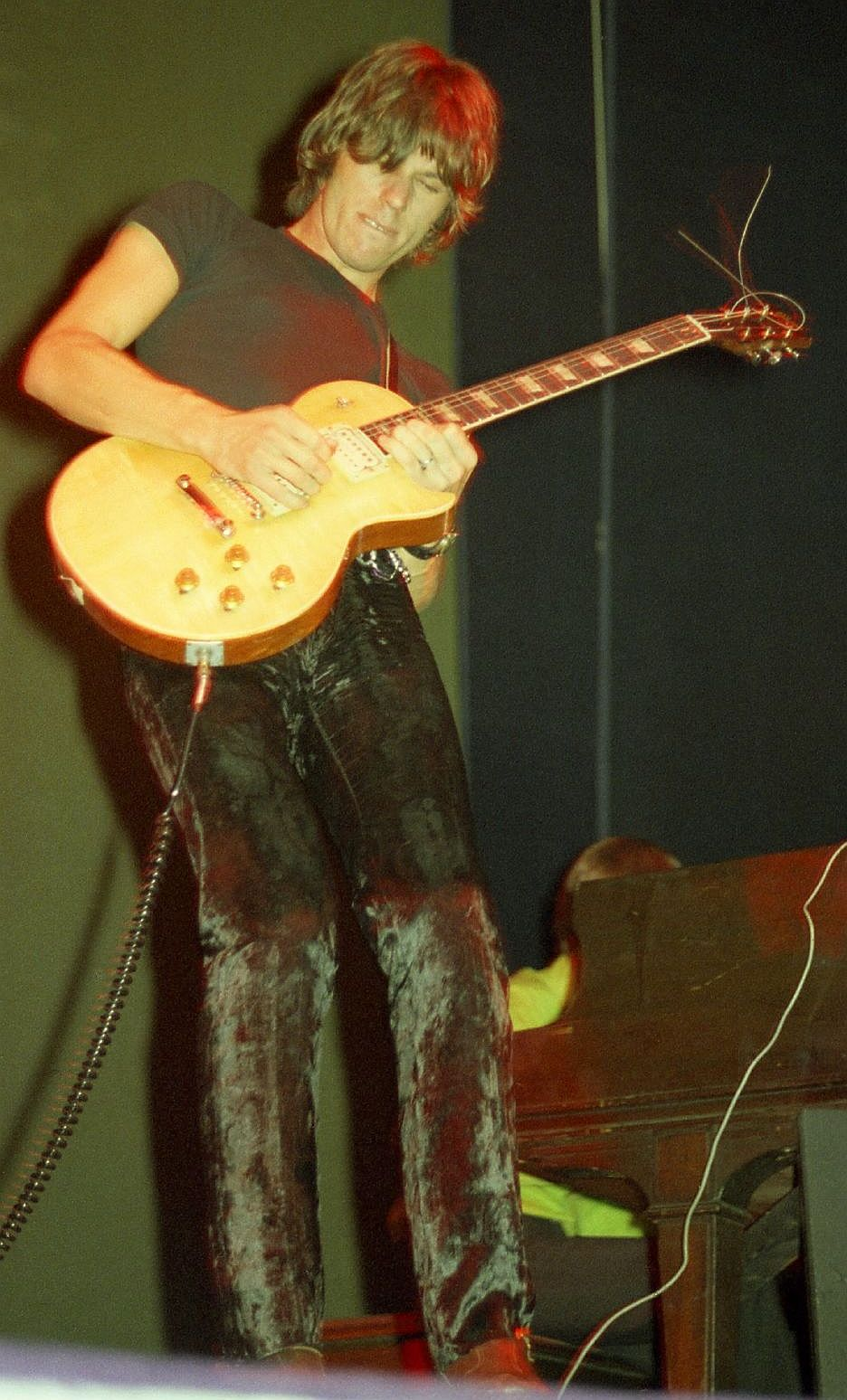
Jeff Beck (1968)

These Les Pauls were considered to be too heavy and old-fashioned, and they initially did not find favor amongst guitarists. In 1961, Gibson stopped producing the traditional Les Paul in favor of a lighter redesign which was later called the SG. The mid-1960s, however, brought a resurgence of interest in the Les Paul Standard. In 1964, The Rolling Stones' Keith Richards began using a sunburst, 1959 Les Paul Standard — becoming the first "star-guitarist" to play a Les Paul on the British scene. The guitar, outfitted with a Bigsby tailpiece, served as one of the guitarist's prominent instruments and provided the first impetus to the use of Les Pauls during the British blues boom. In 1965, Eric Clapton began using Les Pauls because of the influence of Freddie King and Hubert Sumlin, and played a 1960 Standard on the groundbreaking album Blues Breakers with Eric Clapton. In America, Mike Bloomfield began using a 1954 Les Paul goldtop while touring with the Paul Butterfield Blues Band, and recorded most of his work on the band's East-West album with that guitar. A year later, he traded it for a 1959 Standard with which he became most identified. By 1967, Jerry Garcia of the Grateful Dead was using mid-1950s, P-90 pickup-equipped goldtops or black custom models, which he used through 1968. Concurrently in the late 1960s, artists such as Peter Green, Jeff Beck, Paul Kossoff, and Jimmy Page began using sunburst Les Paul Standards. Responding to this influence and increased pressure from the public, Gibson reintroduced the Les Paul single-cutaway guitar in July 1968, and the guitar remains in production today.

=== ECL and Norlin-era (1969–1985) ===
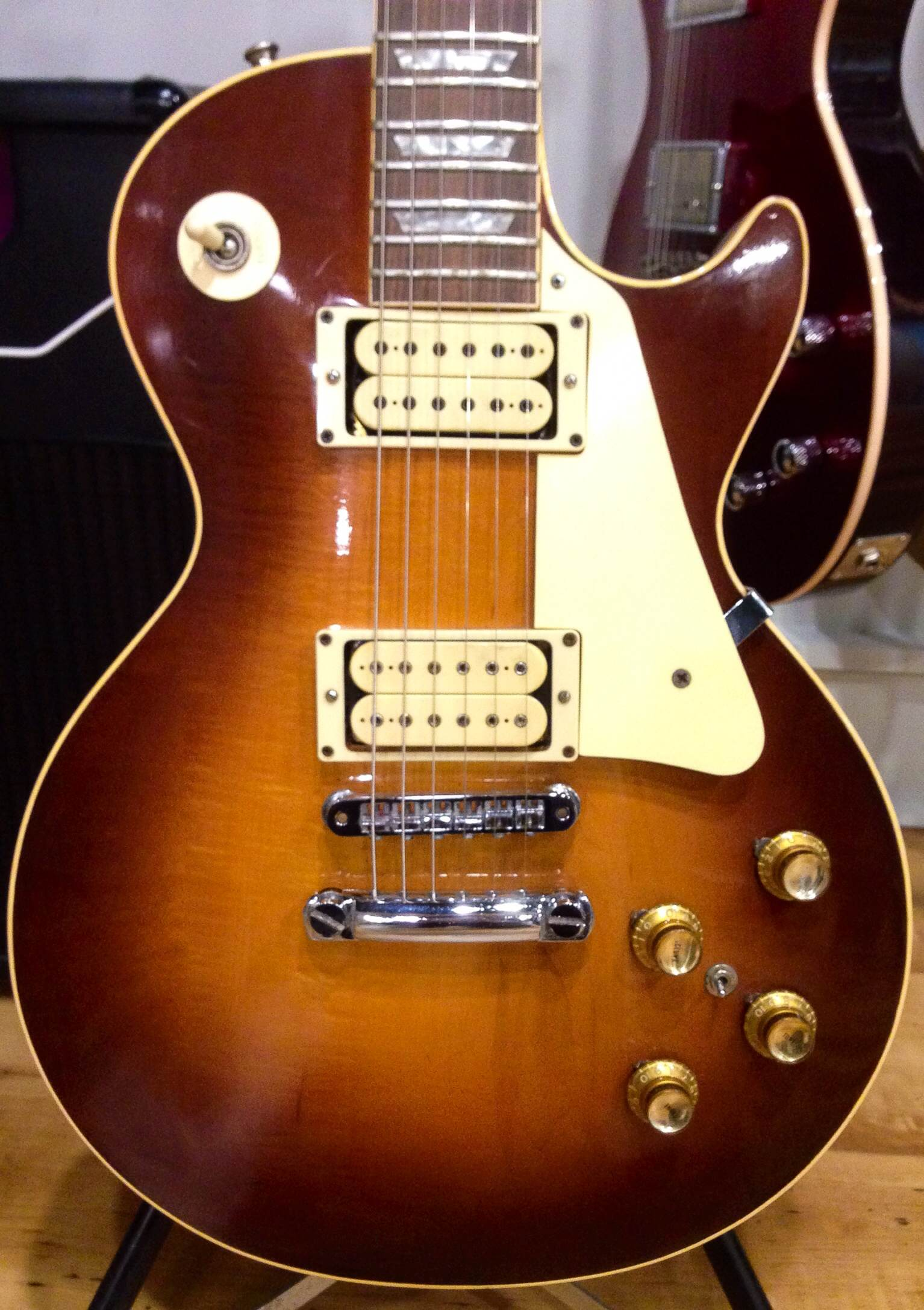
1969 Standard (refinished)

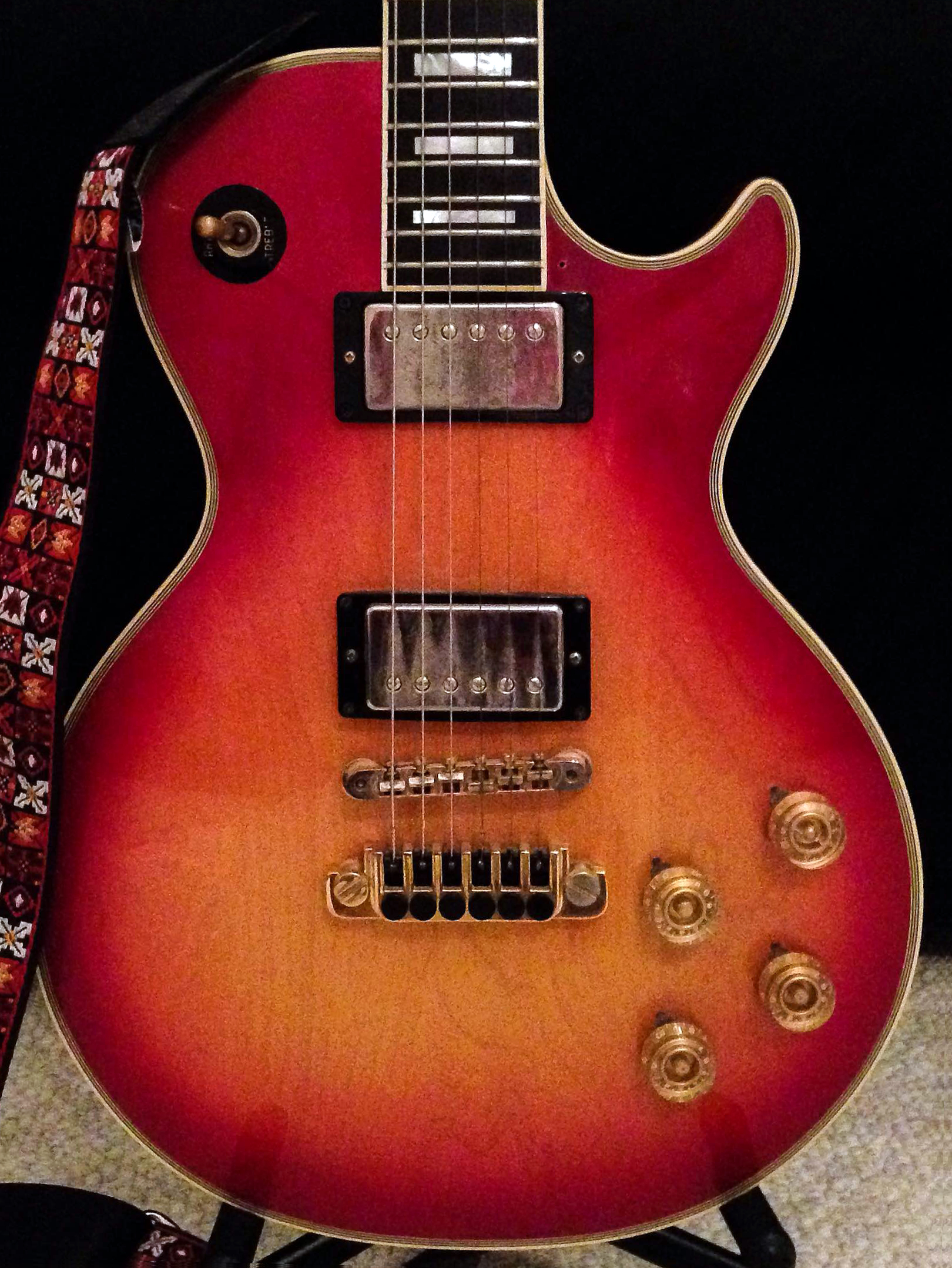
1974 Custom Sunburst

In 1969, Gibson's parent company (Chicago Musical Instruments) was taken over by the conglomerate ECL. Gibson remained under the control of CMI until 1974 when it became a subsidiary of Norlin Musical Instruments.

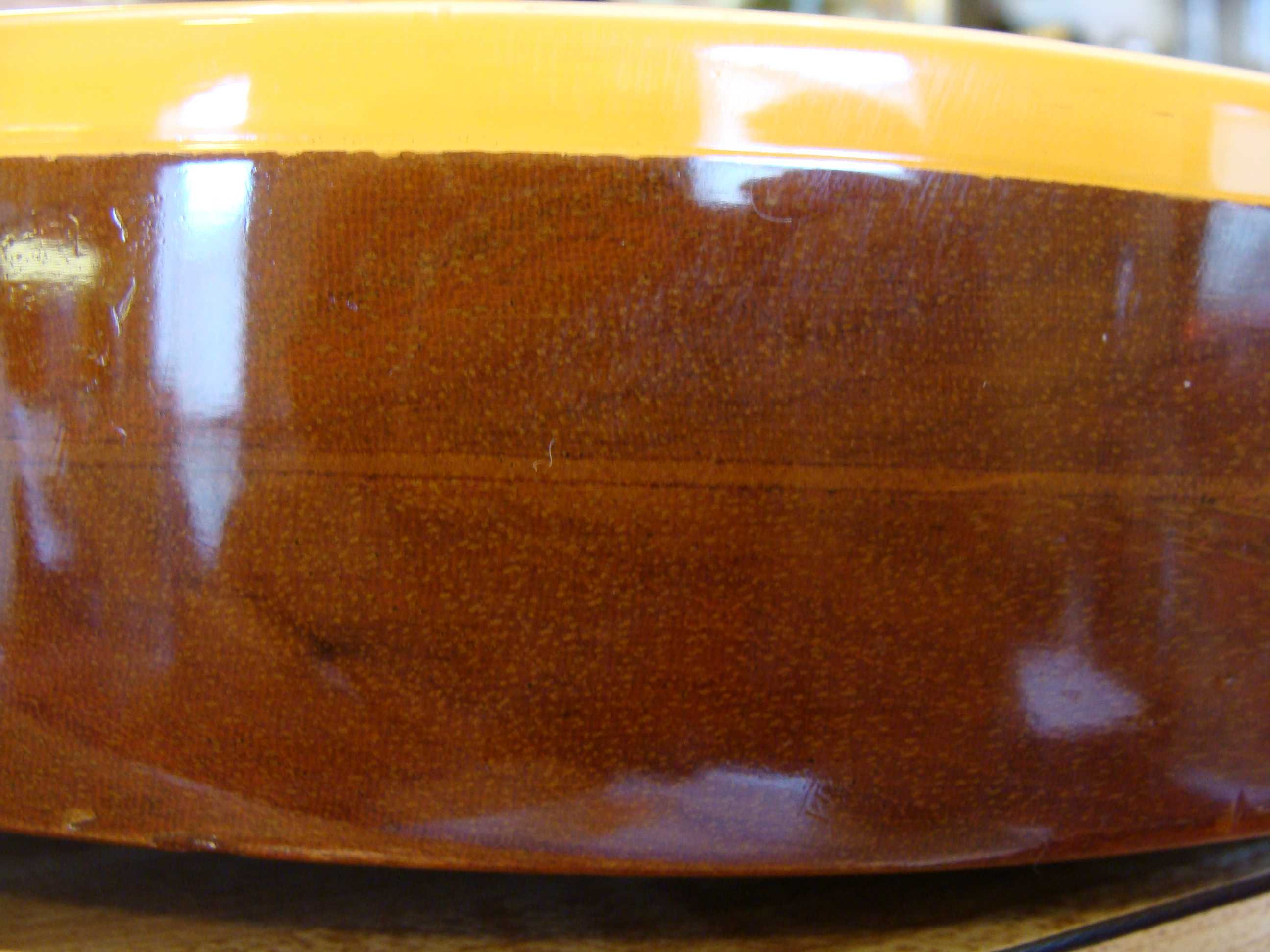
The pancake-like layers, seen on the edge of cross-banding, multi-piece body in Norlin Era

These ownership changes, often called the "Norlin Era", caused Gibson products of the time to undergo changes in manufacturing and construction. Les Paul designs were altered and a reinforced upper neck volute was added to decrease headstock breaks. Neck woods were changed from one-piece mahogany to a three-piece maple design. The body was also changed from one-piece mahogany with a maple top to multiple slabs of mahogany with multiple pieced maple tops. This is referred to as "multipiece" construction, and sometimes incorrectly referred to as a "pancake" body. The expression "pancake body" actually refers to a body made of a thin layer of maple sandwiched between two slabs of mahogany, with a maple cap. The grain of the maple was placed at 90 degrees to that of the mahogany. The "pancake"-like layers are clearly visible when looking at the edge of the guitar. This process is also known as "crossbanding", and was done to make use of less expensive and more readily available thinner mahogany. Crossbanding was phased out by 1977.

In this era, Gibson began experimenting with new models, such as the Les Paul Recording. This guitar was generally unpopular with guitarists because of its complex electronics. Less noticeable changes included, but were not limited to, optional maple fingerboards (added in 1976), pickup cavity shielding, and the crossover of the ABR1 Tune-o-matic bridge into the wide "Nashville" bridge. During the 1970s, the Les Paul body shape was incorporated into other Gibson models, including the S-1, the Sonex, the L6-S, and other models that did not follow the classic Les Paul layout.

=== Post-Norlin ===
In January 1986, Gibson again changed ownership and began manufacturing a range of varied Les Paul models. The 1980s also saw the end to several design characteristics, including the volute and maple neck. However, because of consumer demand, the Gibson Les Paul guitar is available today in a wide array of choices, ranging from guitars equipped with modern digital electronics to classic re-issue models built to match the look and specifications of the guitar's earliest production runs from 1952 to 1960.

In 1986, responding to the high demand for vintage models, Gibson formed a Custom Shop division. Originally, the Custom Shop began producing accurate reproductions of early Les Pauls, as well as one-offs. Today, the Custom Shop produces numerous limited-run "historic-spec" models, as well as signature artist models. The first Custom Shop artist guitar was the 1996 Joe Perry Les Paul, and today, several artist models are offered. "Relic'd" or "aged" models, branded by Gibson as "Vintage Original Spec" (VOS), are made in the Custom Shop to replicate well-used vintage guitars.

As of 2017, Gibson offers several variations of the Les Paul guitar with differences in price, features, electronics and finishes. For example, the modern 'Standard' offers split-coil pickups for a wider range of sounds. The 'Traditional' model offers the more basic features of guitars available during the 1950s to 1980s, and the 'Classic' model offers yet other features. 'Special' and 'Studio' models have a more basic level of finish and are lower-priced. These models are marketed as 'Gibson USA' guitars, capitalizing on their American heritage.

== Models and variations ==
The first model, simply called the "Gibson Les Paul", was released in 1952. This style has since been retroactively named "The Goldtop", as the model came only in one finish: an old gold solid paint, with two P-90 pickups and nickel plated hardware. In 1954, the Gibson Les Paul Custom was added to the model line. The Custom featured a solid black finish, gold-plated hardware, and other high-end appointments, including becoming one of the first Gibson models to have 3 pickups. The standard goldtop model received PAF humbucking pickups in 1957, and the goldtop paint job was retired in 1958 and replaced with a two-tone translucent sunburst paint job. From 1958 onwards, this main model was known as the Les Paul Standard, nicknamed "the Burst", and is known for its high collectability. The original Les Paul body shape was retired in 1961 and radically redesigned as the Gibson SG (which for the first several years was known as the Les Paul SG, before Les Paul's endorsement deal ran out). In the mid-late 1960s, the unique tonal quality of the humbucker-equipped "Burst" models became a favorite among rock guitarists, and this renewed interest caused Gibson to bring back the Standard and Custom models in 1968. They have remained in production ever since; as well Gibson added a number of other model lines over the years, including budget/student lines such as the Les Paul Junior and Les Paul Special, studio-quality guitars with basic appointments but upgraded electronics, such as the Les Paul Professional and Les Paul Recording, and other short-lived models, including dozens of celebrity endorsed models.

=== Goldtop (1952–1958, 1968–present) ===
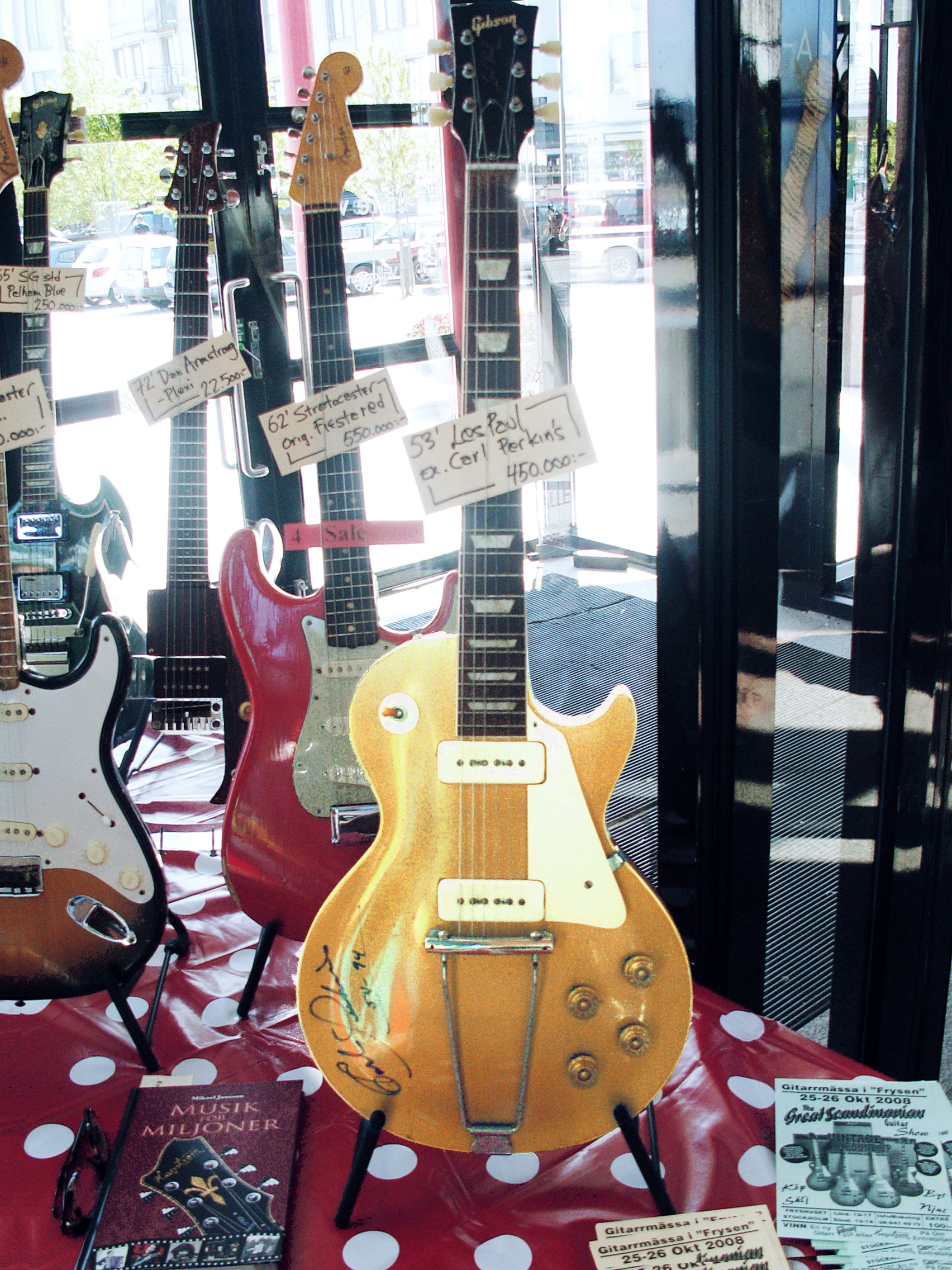
1952–53 Goldtop with trapeze bridge (Note: This guitar (1953 Goldtop exhibited at FUZZ Guitar Show 2008) was used by Carl Perkins on many of his early Sun Records recordings.)

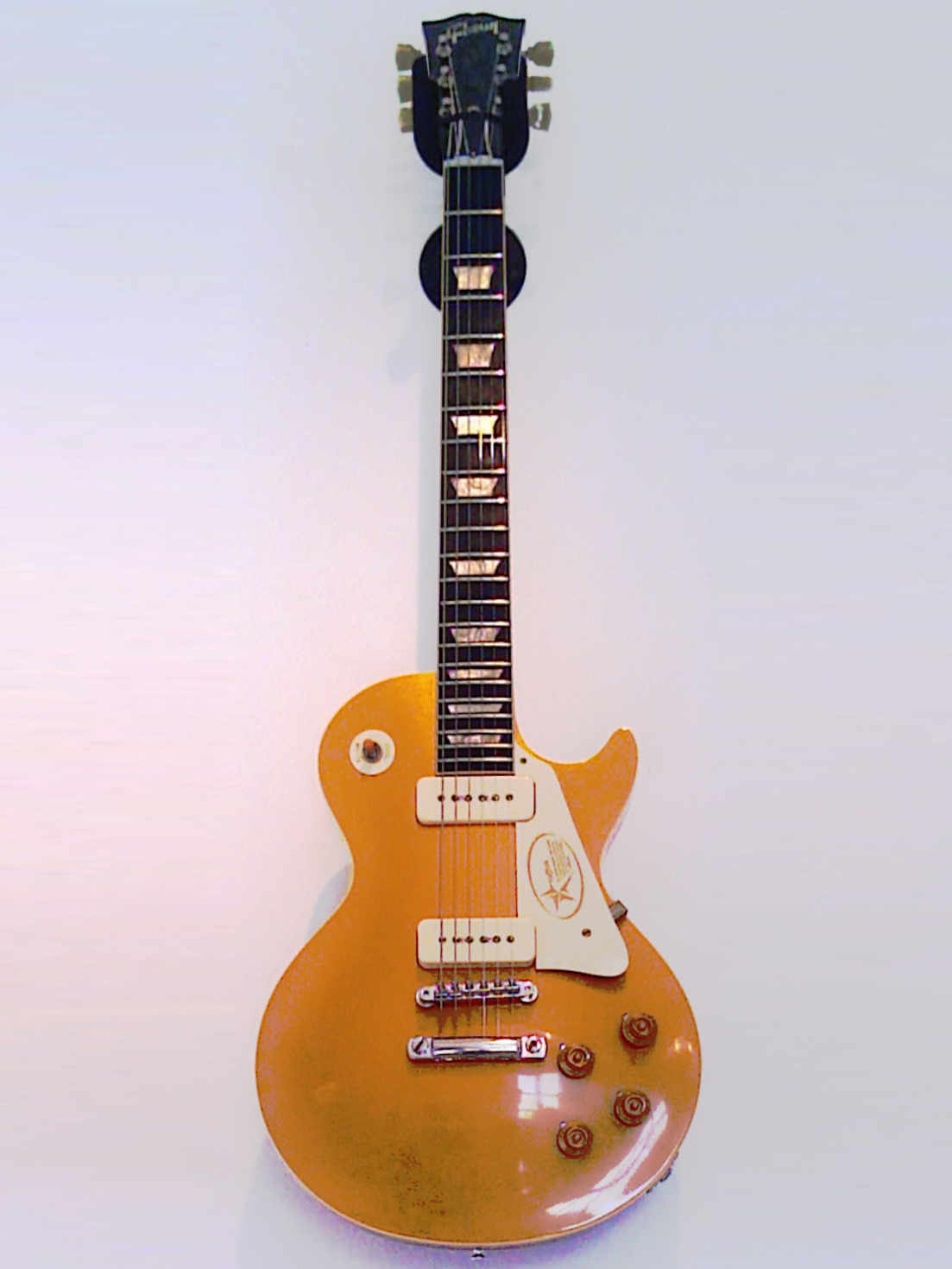
1955–57 Goldtop with Tune-o-matic bridge and stopbar tailpiece (2010s reissue)

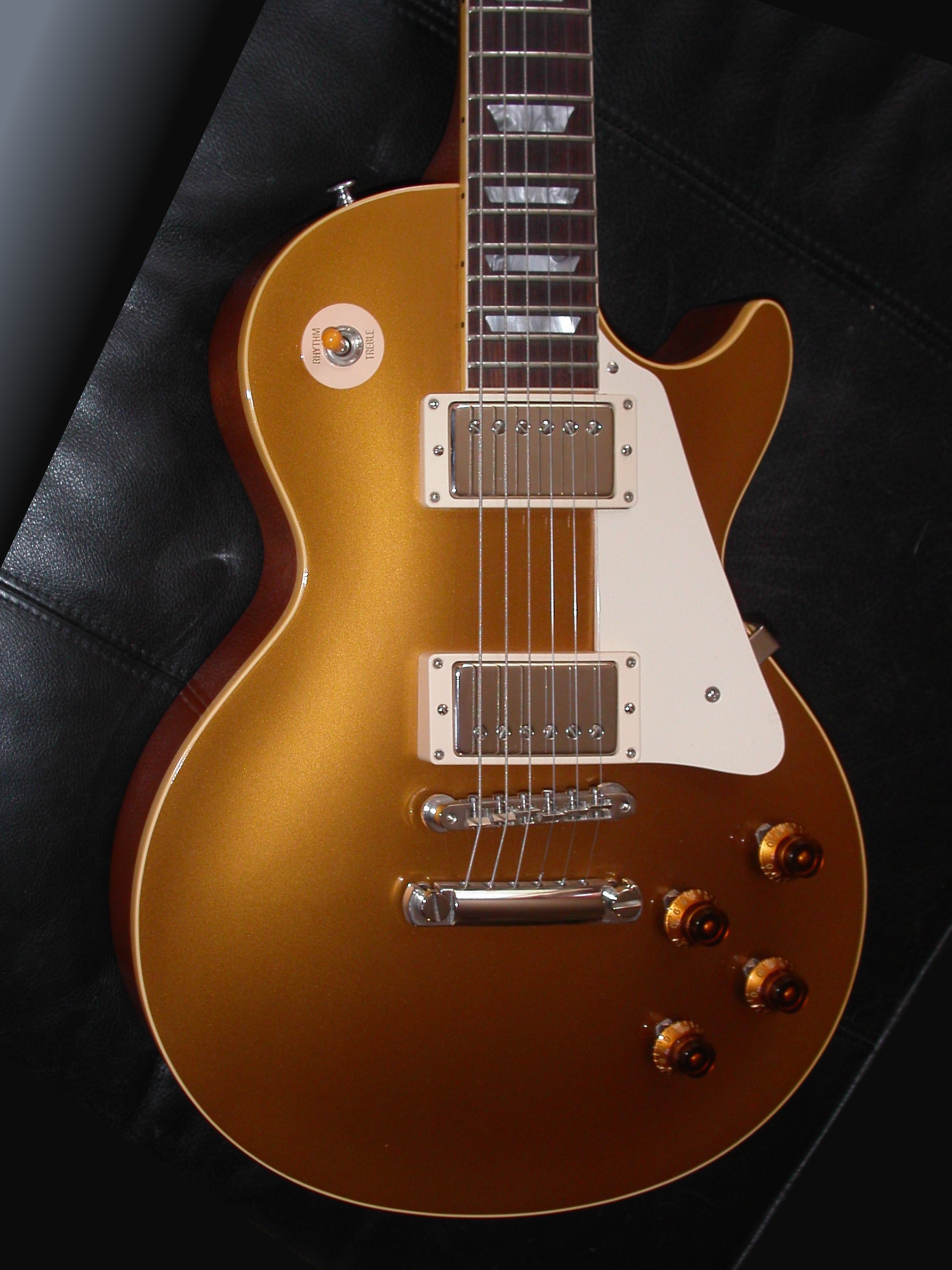
1957–58 Goldtop with PAF pickups (2002 reissue)

The first Les Paul model Goldtops were produced from 1952 to 1957. Early 1952 Les Pauls were not issued serial numbers, did not have bound fingerboards, and are considered by some as "LP Model prototypes". However, later 1952 Les Pauls were issued serial numbers and also came with bound fingerboards. The design scheme of some of these early models varied. For instance, some early Les Pauls were fitted with black covered P-90 pickups instead of the usual cream-colored plastic covers. The weight and the tonal characteristics of the Goldtop Les Paul were largely due to the mahogany and maple construction.

In 1953, the trapeze tailpiece was dropped, and a new stopbar design was added. This design combined a pre-intonated bridge and tailpiece with two studs just behind the bridge pickup. This increased the sustain of the Goldtop noticeably; however, the intonation and string height adjustability were limited. A new design, the Tune-o-matic, replaced the stopbar in 1955. It consisted of a separate bridge and tailpiece attached directly to the top of the guitar, combining an easily adjustable bridge with a sustain-carrying tailpiece. This design has been used on most Les Pauls ever since. The tuners were produced by Kluson.

=== Custom (1954–1960, 1968–present) ===
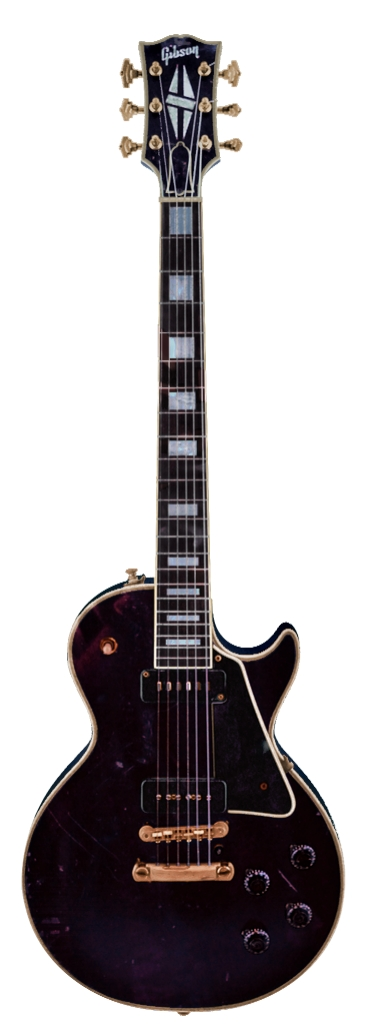
1954 Custom with P90 and Alnico pickups

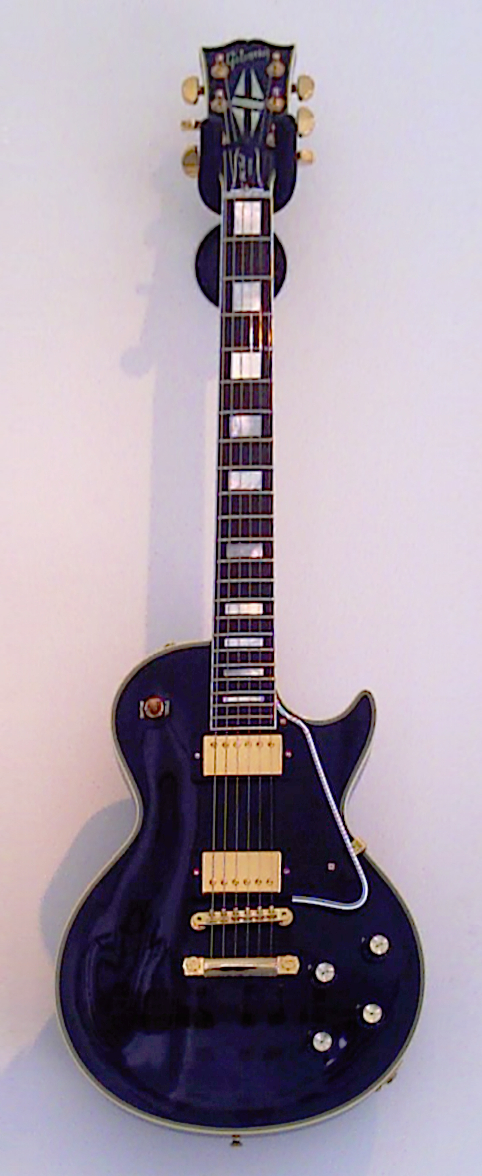
1960 Custom reissue with PAF pickups

The Les Paul Custom features gold hardware, multilayer binding including the headstock, ebony fingerboard, real mother-of-pearl inlays and two or three-pickup layout. 1950s Customs were all-mahogany, rather than the mahogany-with-maple-cap of the Goldtop. The original Customs were fitted with a P-90 pickup in the bridge position and an Alnico V "staple" pickup in the neck. In 1957, the Custom was fitted with Gibson's new PAF humbucker pickups, and later became available with three pickups instead of the usual two. The traditional Les Paul Custom was discontinued in 1961 and its name transferred to the custom version of the then-new Gibson SG.

In 1968, Gibson reintroduced the Les Paul Custom as a two-pickup-only model. The headstock angle was changed from 17 degrees to 14, and a wider headstock and a maple top (in lieu of the original 1953–1961 mahogany top construction) were added. White and two sunburst finish options were added to the color palette in 1974. Also new in 1974 was the optional TP-6 fine-tuner tailpiece, allowing for micro-adjustment of string tuning from the bridge. The mahogany neck was replaced with a three-piece maple neck in 1975 (though mahogany still saw limited use) with this change lasting until around 1982. Popular colors, such as wine red and "silverburst", were added in the 1970s and '80s. Gibson currently produces several Custom models with various finishes and pickups.

=== Standard (1958–1960, 1976–present) ===
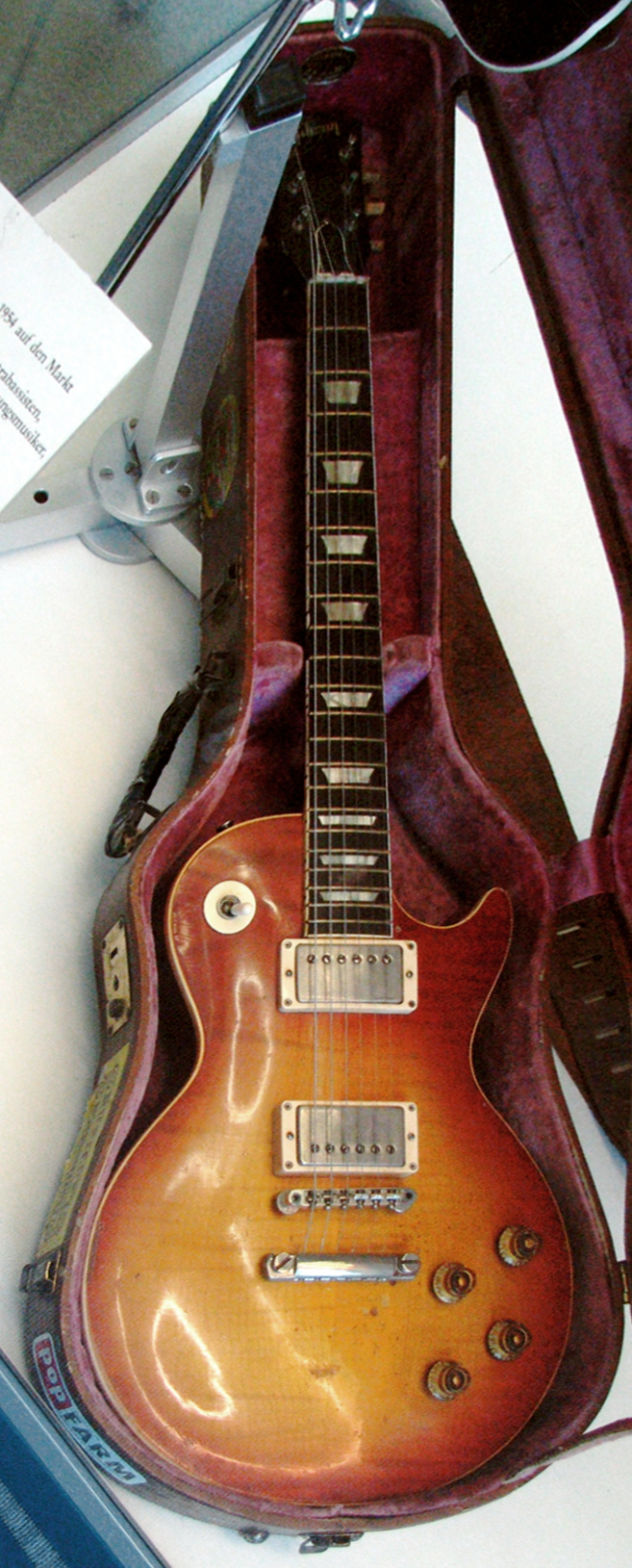
1958 Gibson Les Paul Standard, owned by Martin Ernst AllStars

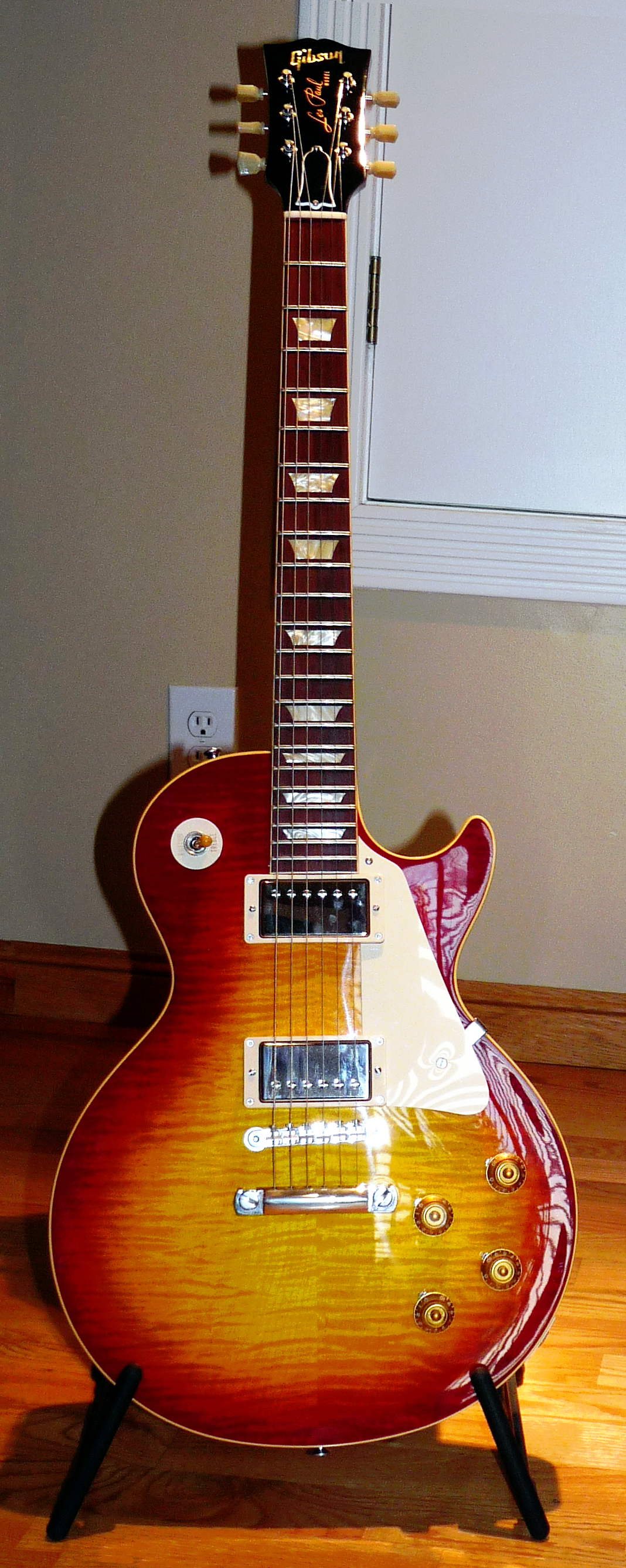
Gibson Custom 50th Anniversary 1959 Les Paul Standard (2009)

In 1958, new Standard model retained most specifications of the 1957 Goldtop, including PAF humbucker pickups, a maple top, and a tune-o-matic bridge with a stop tailpiece or Bigsby vibrato tailpiece. The gold color used since 1952 was replaced by a cherry-red version of the Sunburst finish long used on Gibson's flat-top and archtop acoustic and hollow electric guitars. Since the maple cap was now visible, tops were made either with a solid "plaintop" piece of maple or two bookmatched pieces of figured (curly or quilted) maple. To differentiate from the earlier Goldtop model, the new Les Paul was referred to as the Les Paul Standard. Specifications during 1958–60 varied from year to year and also from guitar to guitar. Typical 1958 Les Paul Standard necks had a thicker neck, thinner frets and lower fret height, which changed during the course of 1959 to develop into typical 1960 necks with a thinner cross-section and wider, higher frets. The cherry dye used on the 1958–59 models faded rapidly from ultraviolet light exposure, so in early 1960 Gibson switched to a new, fade-resistant formulation which was also less translucent and slightly more orange; this is sometimes called the "tomato soup burst". Fading of the original paint job was unpredictable, as the red color could either lighten or darken depending on the specific formulation and on the conditions the guitar had been exposed to, resulting in a wide array of nicknames, such as "lemon burst" or "tobacco burst", for the resulting colorations. Despite the wide variety of color variations now found on the original 1958–59 models, they all went to market with nearly identical paint jobs. Furthermore, during the production run, Gibson changed the color of plastic used on the pickup bobbins multiple times between black and white again; however during assembly, pickups were assembled semi-randomly, with no attention given to matching the two single-coil bobbins to each other when building the humbucking pickups; the guitar was sold with a nickel-plated pickup cover, so Gibson did not consider the color of the bobbins to be an aesthetic consideration. Additionally, since the translucent finish allowed the wood grain to show, each Sunburst model has a unique combination of finish fade, wood grain, and pickup colors resulting in a highly individualized guitar, adding to the collectability of the model. Many famous original Les Paul standards can be easily identified by their unique appearance.

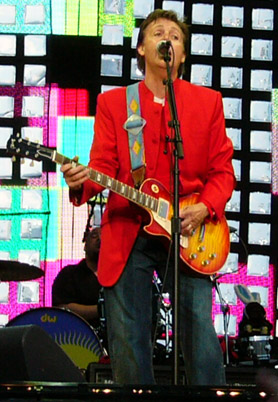
Paul McCartney playing a 1960 left-handed cherryburst Les Paul

Original production of the Standards lasted from 1958 to early 1961. As Gibson only kept records on shipments of "Les Paul" models, and the Sunburst Standard overlapped production years with both the earlier Goldtop and later SG models, nailing down exact production numbers is difficult. Depending on the source, it is estimated anywhere from 1,200 to 1,700 of these early models were made and have subsequently become highly valuable.

Production ended in 1961 when Gibson redesigned the Les Paul to feature a "double cutaway" body, which has subsequently become the Gibson SG. The model was quietly reintroduced to dealers as early as 1972 before production of Les Paul Standards "officially" resumed in 1976 due to high demand. They have remained in continuous production since then, as well as periodic reissues from the Gibson Custom Shop, using the original 1958–60 specs.

=== Junior (1954–1960) and TV (1955–1960) ===
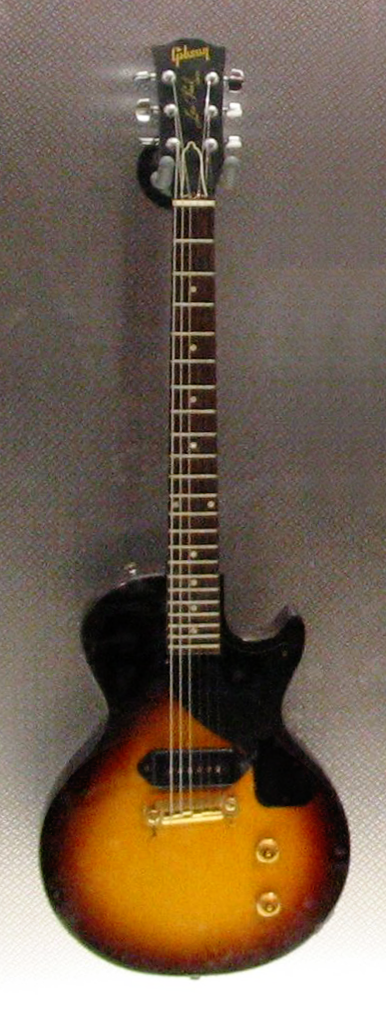
1958 Junior

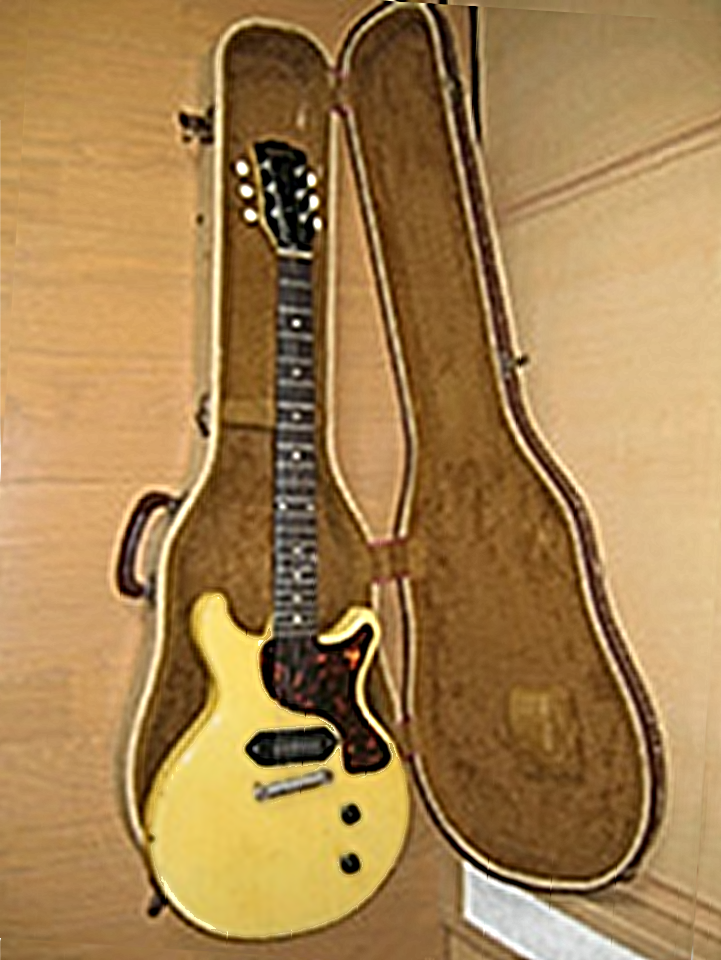
1959 TV reissue (Junior DC in TV Yellow)

In 1954, the Les Paul Junior debuted, targeting the beginner or student guitarist. As a cost-saving measure, many of the appointments of the Standard and Custom models are absent from the Junior. The Junior is characterized by its flat-top "slab" mahogany body (in contrast to the carved maple top on other models), finished in sunburst. It had a single P-90 pickup (in contrast to the two- and three-humbucker pickup configurations on the more expensive models), simple volume and tone controls, an unbound rosewood fingerboard with plain dot-shape position markers, and a combination bridge/tailpiece unit similar to the Goldtop.

In 1955, Gibson launched the Les Paul TV model, which was identical to the Junior except for the name and a fashionable contemporary "limed oak" style finish, later more accurately named "limed mahogany". This natural wood finish with white grain filler often aged into a natural wood or dull yellow appearance, and eventually evolved into the opaque mustard yellow, popularly called "TV yellow". The model was not, as a popular myth says, to avoid glare from old TV cameras, but a modern look and a name to promote "The Les Paul & Mary Ford Show" then on television.

Gibson made a radical design change to their Junior and TV models in 1959: to accommodate player requests for more access to the top frets than the previous designs allowed, these electric guitar models were revamped with a new double-cutaway body shape. In addition, Juniors were now available with a cherry red finish, while the re-shaped TV adopted a more yellow-tinged finish.

=== Special (1955–1960) ===
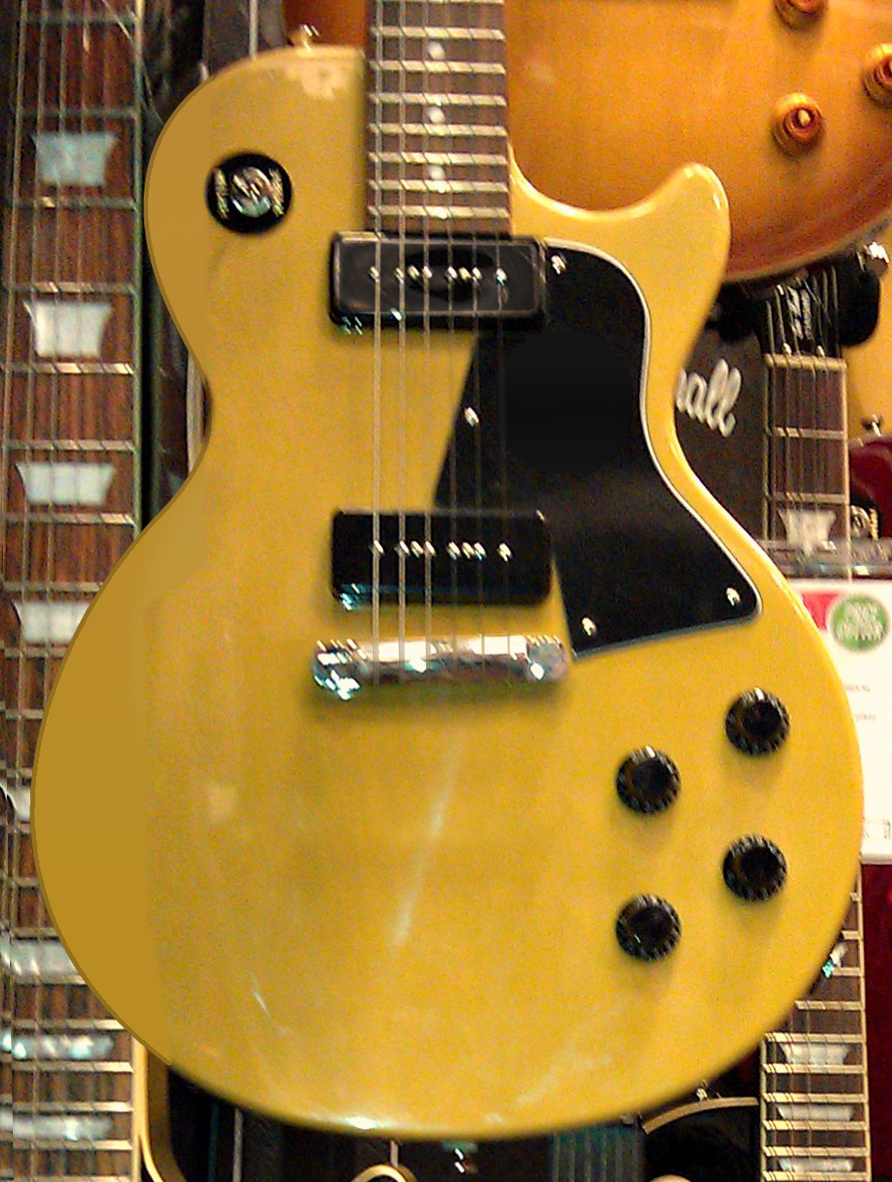
1956 Les Paul Special Singlecut in TV Yellow

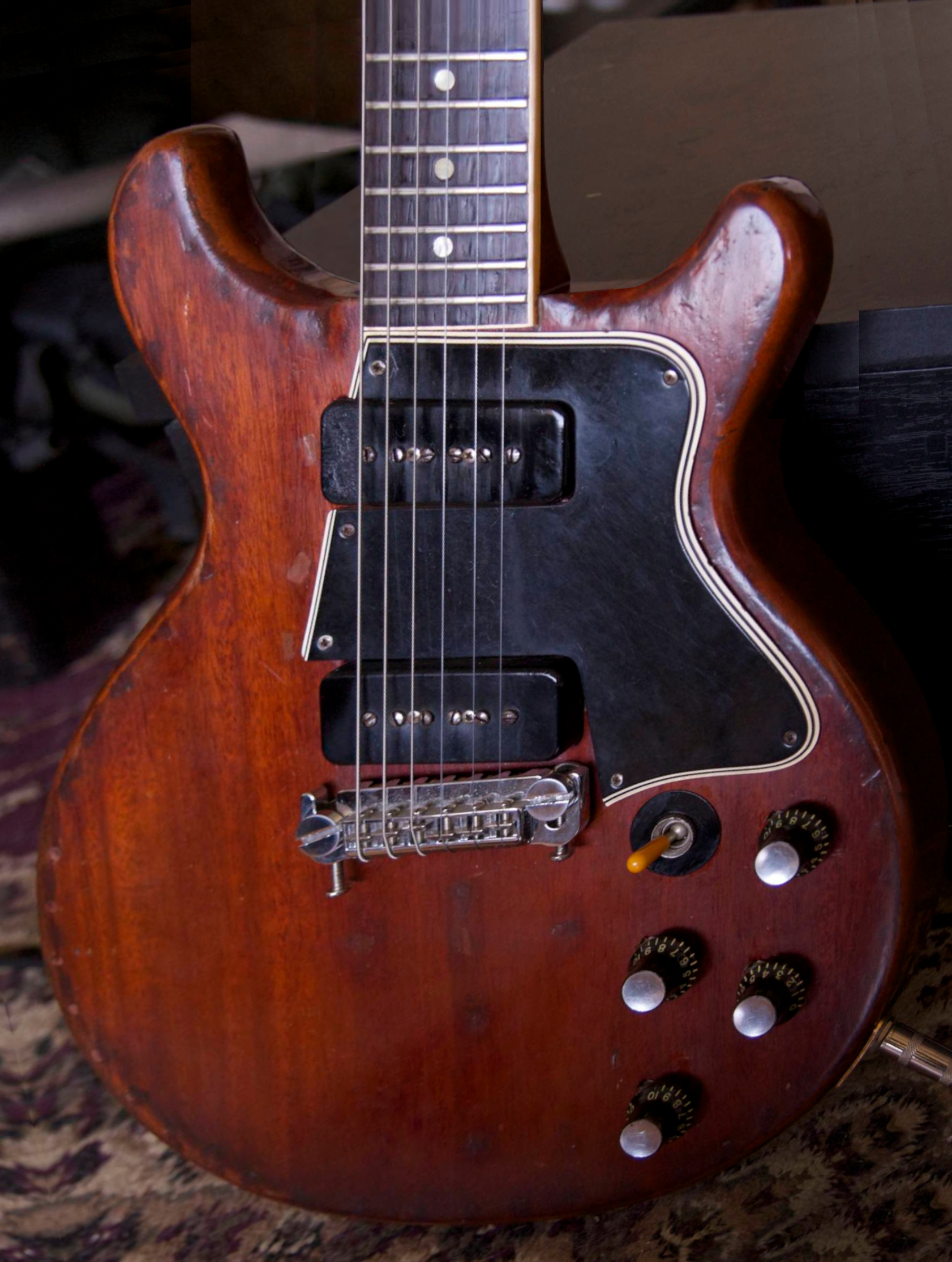
1960 Les Paul Special Doublecut ("SG Special")

The Les Paul Special was released in 1955, featuring a slab body, two soapbar P-90 single coil pickups, and was finished in a color similar to TV Yellow (but not called a TV model). It fit in the model line between the Junior and the Standard, having the two-pickup configuration of the Standard, but featuring the simpler, more basic appointments of the Junior.

In 1959, the Special was given the same new double-cutaway body shape as the Junior and the TV received in 1959. Around this time, Les Paul decided to discontinue his affiliation with Gibson; the model was renamed "SG Special" in the late 1959. However, when the new design was applied to the two-pickup Special, the cavity for the neck pickup overlapped the neck-to-body joint. This weakened the joint to the point that the neck could break after only moderate handling. The problem was soon resolved when Gibson designers moved the neck pickup farther down the body, producing a stronger joint and eliminating the breakage problem.

=== Les Paul SG (1961–1963) ===
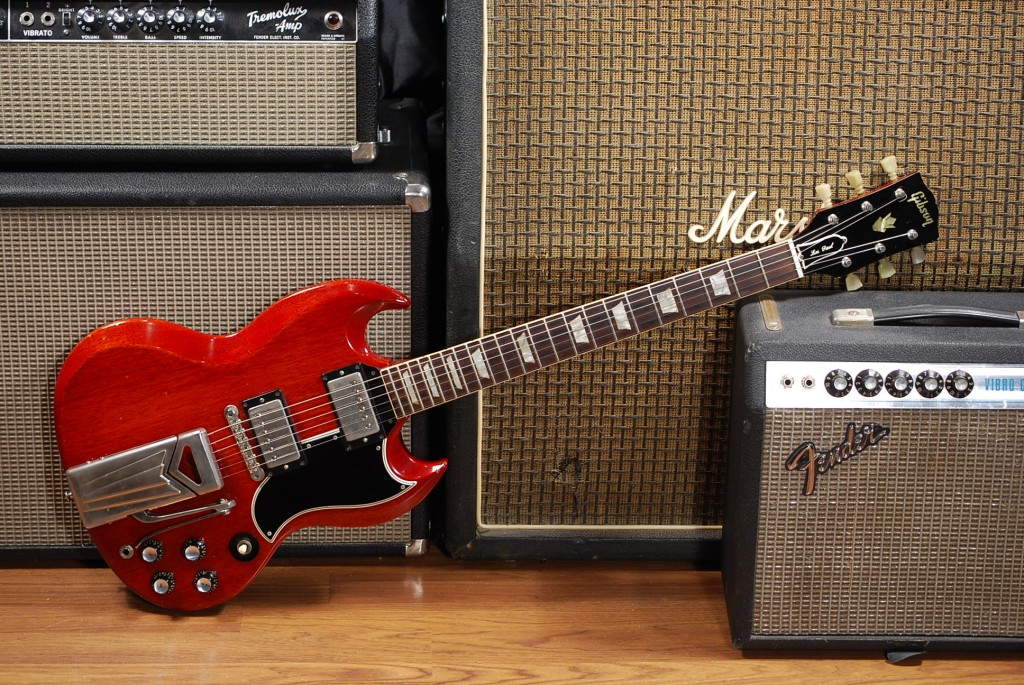
1962 Les Paul Standard (SG Standard)

In 1960, Gibson experienced a decline in electric guitar sales due to strong competition from Fender's comparable but much lighter double-cutaway design, the Stratocaster. In response, Gibson modified the Les Paul line. For 1961, the Les Paul was thinner and much lighter than earlier models, with two sharply pointed cutaways and a vibrato system. However, the redesign was done without Les Paul's knowledge, and he hated the design, so he asked Gibson to remove his name. The double cutaway design retained the "Les Paul" name until 1963 when Les Paul's endorsement deal with Gibson ended. Without a contract, Gibson could no longer call its guitars "Les Pauls", and it renamed them "SGs" (for "Solid Guitars").

=== Deluxe (1970–1985) ===
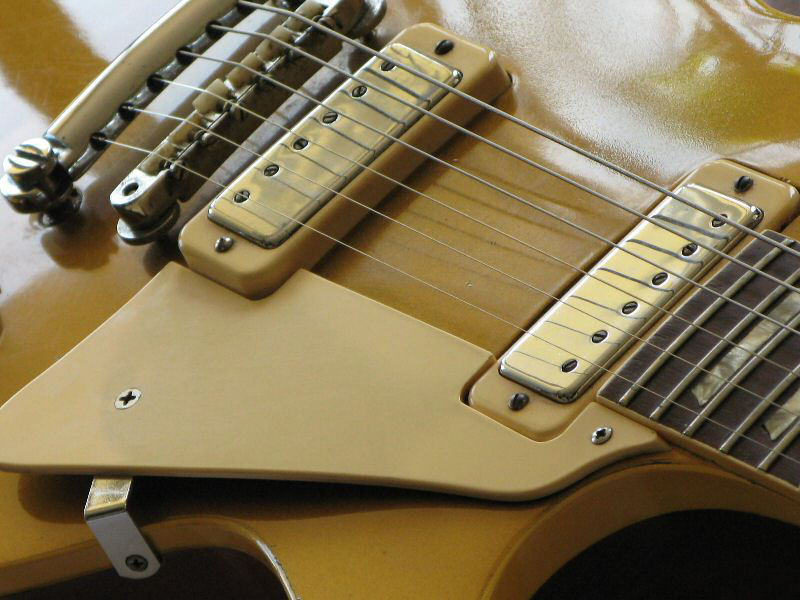
1972 Deluxe with mini-humbuckers

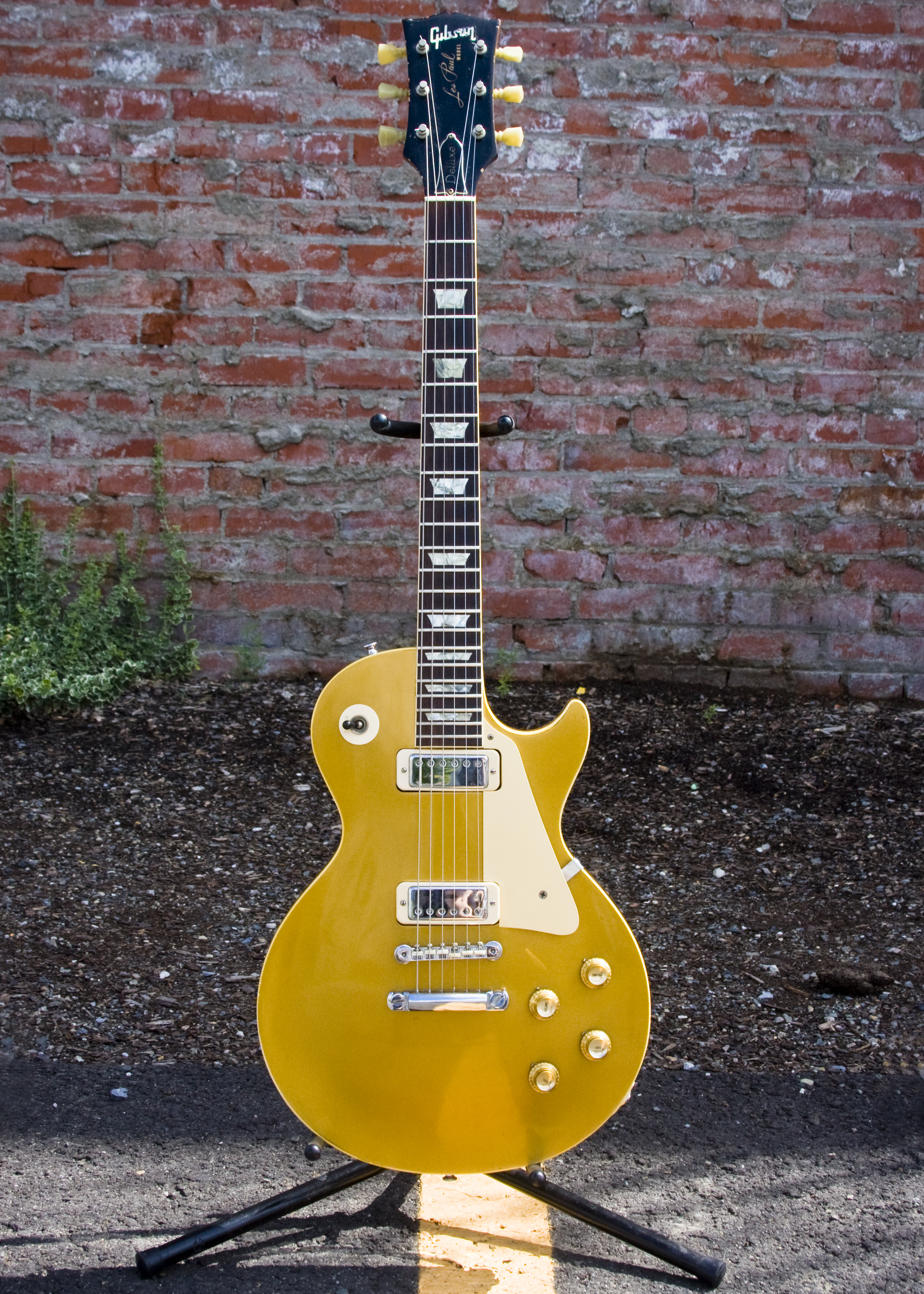
1970s Deluxe

The Deluxe was among the "new" 1968–1969 Les Pauls and seen as an evolution of the Special. This model featured "mini-humbuckers", also known as "New York" humbuckers, and did not initially prove popular. The mini-humbucker pickups fit into the pre-carved P-90 pickup cavity using an adaptor ring developed by Gibson in order to use a surplus supply of Epiphone mini-humbuckers. The Deluxe was introduced in 1970 and helped to standardize production among Gibson's U.S.-built Les Pauls. The first incarnation of the Deluxe featured a one-piece body and slim three-piece neck (It has been thought that some of these early "one-piece" bodies were actually leftovers from original 1950s Les Paul parts). The multi-piece body (a thin layer of maple on top of two layers of Honduran mahogany) arrived later in 1969. Towards the end of that year, a reinforcing neck volute was added. 1969 Deluxes feature the Gibson logo devoid of the dot over the "i" in Gibson. By late 1969/early 1970, the dot over the "i" had returned, plus a "Made In USA" stamp on the back of the headstock. Gibson produced 216 Deluxe Gold Top as specially-ordered guitars with full-size humbucker t-tops pickups between 1972 and 1974 (179 in 1973, 28 in 1974 and 9 in 1972), as a Les Paul Standard pickup specification.

Until the end of the year 1974, 90% of the Gibson Les Paul Deluxe manufactured were Gold Top. New colors emerged from 1975, less valued than the Gold Top. By late 1975, the neck construction was changed from mahogany to maple. This lasted until the early 1980s, when the construction returned to mahogany. The body changed back to solid mahogany from the pancake design in late 1976 or early 1977. In 1985 Gibson discontinued the Deluxe model.

=== Professional (1969–1971) ===
The Les Paul Professional was produced from 1969 to 1971, it was a rare model as only around 118 were ever produced. Designed primarily as a studio guitar, it featured an unadorned dark-stained mahogany slab body with two low-impedance pickups mounted at an angle and a unique control layout that included not only the standard "rhythm/lead" switch, but also two toggles between the tailpiece and the volume/tone knobs that allowed for additional tone options. The low-impedance pickups required a special cable that included an on-board transformer. The model came with either a stop tailpiece or a Gibson-branded Bigsby vibrato tailpiece. Chicago guitarist Terry Kath used a Les Paul Professional both in the studio and on stage. The model was never popular, and was phased out in 1971 and replaced with the Les Paul Recording model, which itself was replaced in 1983 by the Les Paul Studio model. A few Professionals shipped in 1972 and 1973, though the catalogues had switched to the Recording model by then.

=== Recording (1971–1979) ===
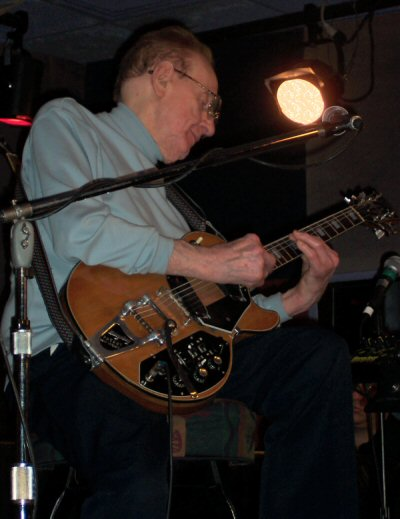
Les Paul playing his customized 1971 Les Paul Recording guitar

The Les Paul Recording was produced from late 1971–1979 (the first models shipped in 1972). It was a slightly modified version of the Professional model, and featured the same low-impedance pickups and same body, though with a lighter-colored stain. The control layout was changed, the rhythm/lead selector switch was moved near the other controls from the upper left to lower right side of the guitar body, and the tone control toggle switches were rotated 90 degrees. The plastic plate to label the switches and knobs was larger than the Professional model as well. Les Paul himself favored the Recording model among all of the guitars to bear his name; it was his main guitar during his years playing at the Iridium Jazz Club and other New York venues. The model was re-issued in 2014.

=== The Paul (1978–1982) ===
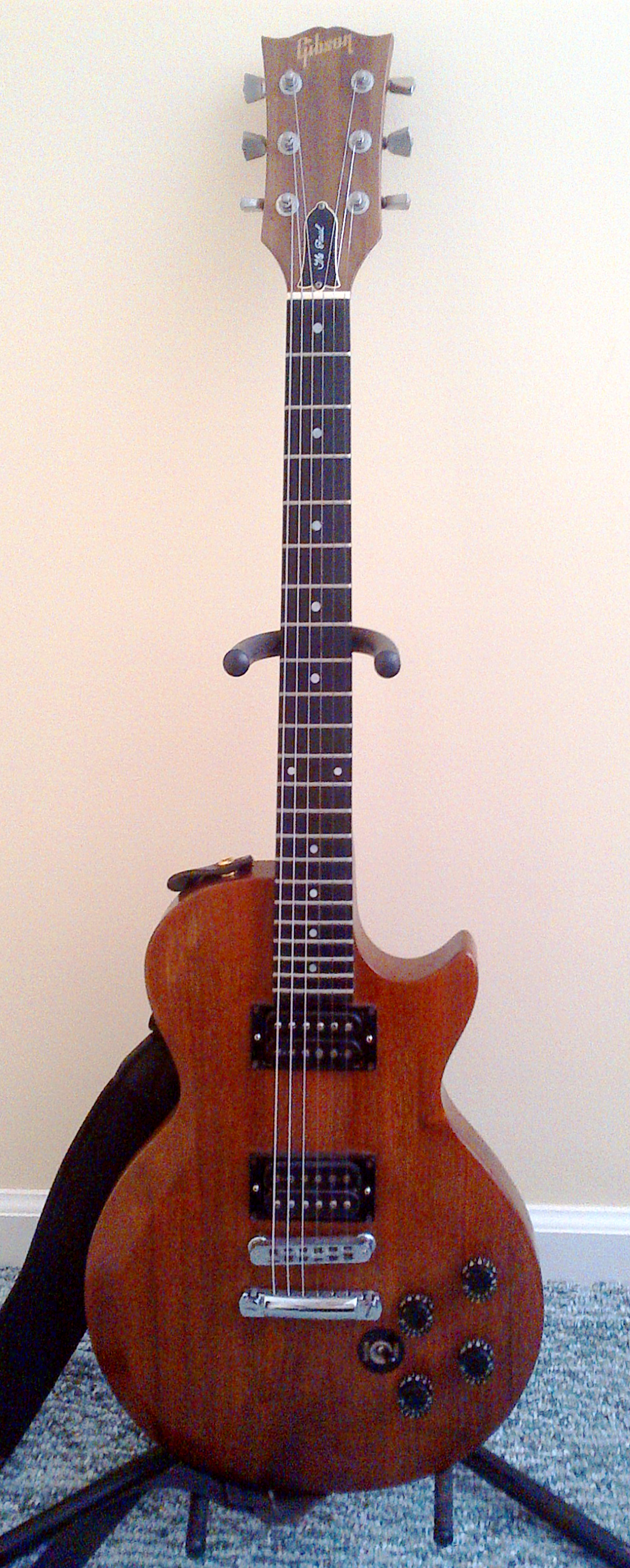
Gibson The Paul

A single sharp cutaway Les Paul-style walnut body, set walnut neck, pearl dot inlays, walnut headstock overlay with gold Gibson logo (1978–1981) or Gibson logo branded into the headstock (Firebrand, 1981–1982). Hardware included three-per-side tuners, stop tailpiece, two exposed humbucker pickups, four knobs (two volume, two tone), three-way pickup switch, chrome hardware, available in Natural Walnut finish. It was manufactured between 1978 and 1982. It included such high end items as Grover tuning keys and the Tune-O-Matic bridge. It has become affectionately referred to as "The Coffee Table Burst" because of its natural finish.

=== Studio (1983–present) ===
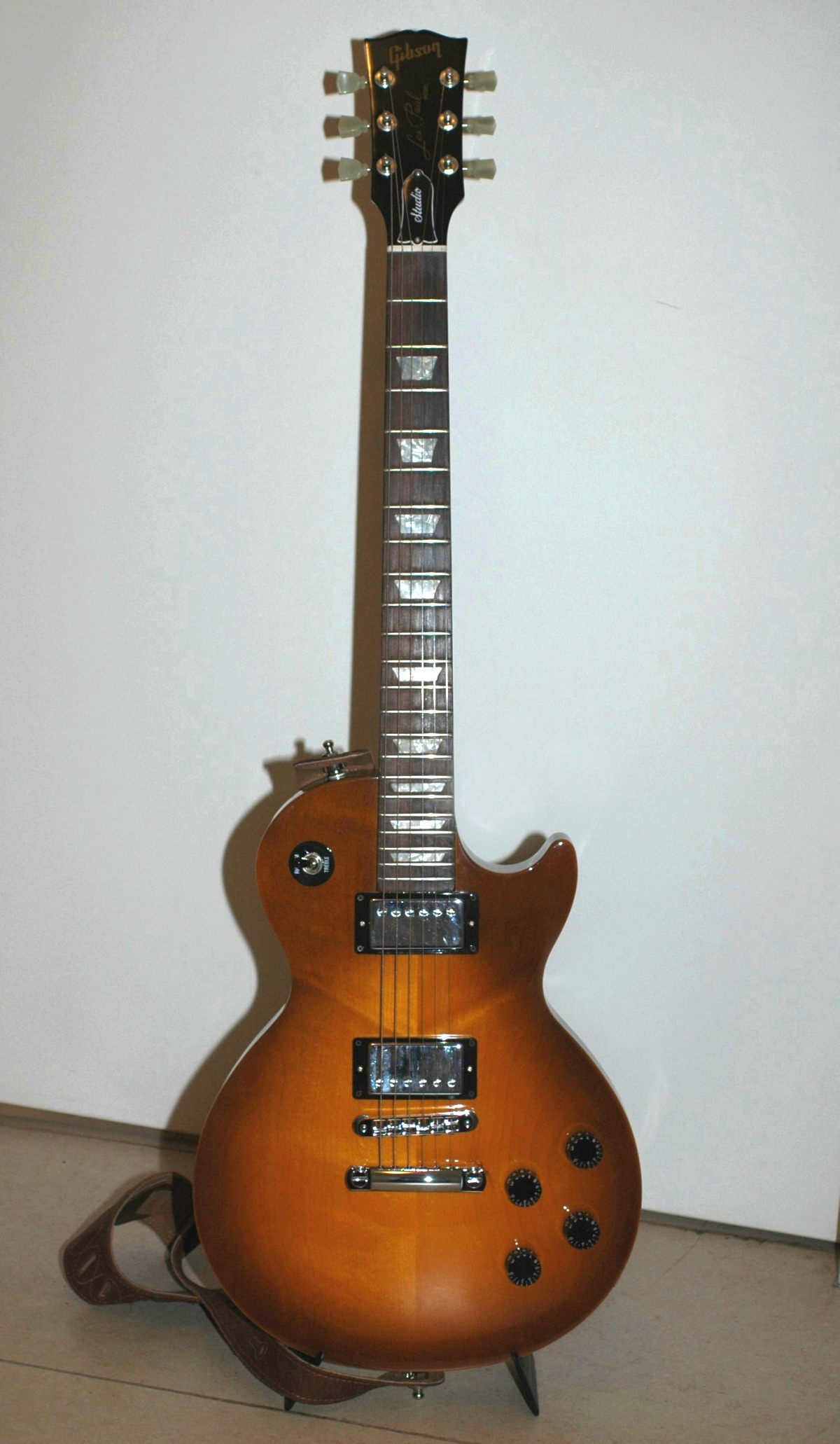
Studio

The Studio model was introduced in 1983, and is still in production. The guitar is intended for the studio musician; therefore, the design features of the "Les Paul Studio" are centered on optimal sound output and not on flashy appearance. This model retains only the elements of the Gibson Les Paul that contribute to tone and playability, including the carved maple top and standard mechanical and electronic hardware. However, the Studio design, until 2017, omits several stock Gibson ornamentations that do not affect sound quality, including body/neck binding. The first Studios from 1983 to 1986 were made with alder bodies rather than mahogany/maple. The current Studios come with a chambered mahogany body with either a maple or mahogany cap. The entry-level Les Paul Studio "faded" has a weight-relieved mahogany body and top and a satin finish. In 2018 neck binding and a pair of Gibson's most popular humbucking pickups, 57 Classic and 57 Classic+, and two push-pull pots were introduced. In order to guarantee the stability of the tuning and an excellent sustain were introduced the Grover tuners, the self-lubricating nut and the aluminium tune-o-matic bridge.

Gibson also offered the Studio in a "standard" model. This variant was adorned with neck and body binding, ebony fretboard and sunburst paint job. All Studios at the time had dot fretboard markers and a thinner body.

=== Memphis ES-Les Paul (2014–2016) ===
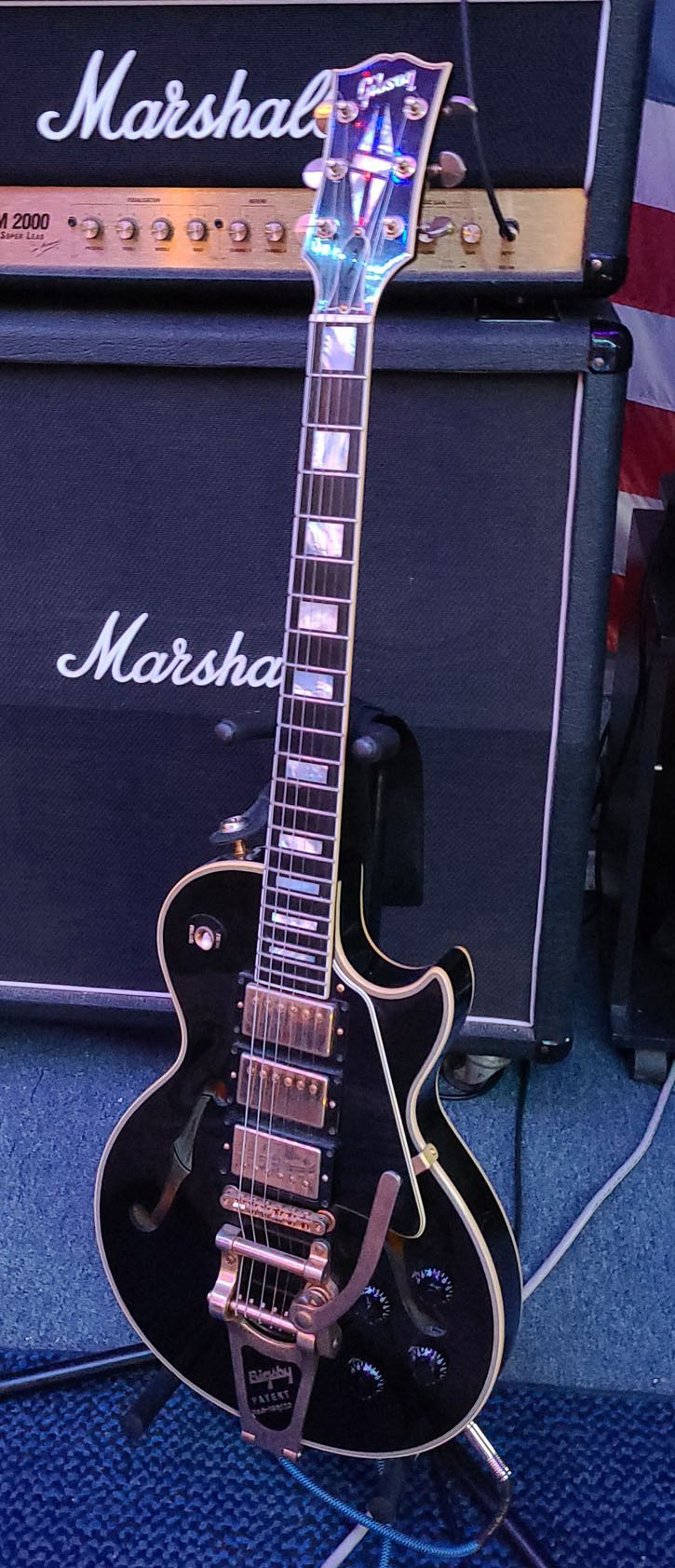
Gibson Memphis Black Beauty

Gibson released the Memphis ES-Les Paul in 2014. It is a semi-acoustic model with f-holes and most with two Alnico humbuckers. There was a limited Custom Shop run of VOS Black Beauty ES Les Pauls with three humbuckers. Some of these limited run guitars were also fitted with Bigsby tailpieces. The neck is mahogany, but the sides and back are laminated maple and poplar. A mahogany block runs throughout the body to increase sustain.

The Les Paul Memphis ES was released with Gibson's MHS (Memphis Historic Spec) humbuckers. These scatter wound pickups have unbalanced coils to emulate vintage PAFs. The bridge and middle pickups both have Alnico II magnets while the neck pickup houses an Alnico III.

In addition to the factory-installed Bigsby B7 and retro 'Milk Bottle' Grover Rotomatics on some models, other vintage enhancements were added to the guitar. The neck features a Historic-style truss-rod, rolled fingerboard edges, and is fretted over top of the binding. The three-pickup wiring offers modern switching and employs Orange Drop capacitors for less treble-cut.

Due to its limited run, the Memphis ES-Les Paul has become a sought-after and collectible Les Paul model.

=== HP (2016–2019) ===
The Gibson Les Paul HP – which stands for "High Performance" – was introduced in 2016, intending to be a Les Paul version featuring the most modern features, like the G-Force automatic tuner, a compound radius fretboard, a titanium adjustable zero-fret nut, and a carved fast access neck heel, similar to the Axcess model. Each knob had a push/pull function allowing to split the pickups and transient suppression. The guitar came in a special hardshell case, with a polished aluminium finish.

The model was slightly modified in 2017, when the toggle-switch plate was removed, the knobs changed from ordinary speed knobs to chrome top hat ones, and the pickup rings changed from white to chrome.

The model had a major change in 2018, with the complete removal of the pickup rings – the pickups were now mounted at the back of the guitar, with two screws for each pickup. This change made pickup swap noticeably harder, demanding a modification of the mounting piece of each pickup, which had to be bent inwards.

The model was again changed in 2019, reversing the 2018 pickup ring removal. The knobs changed to transparent top hat ones, and the G-Force tuner was removed with locking tuners being added. This was the last of the HP series, which was discontinued in 2020.

=== Dark Fire ===
Gibson Dark Fire
- Manufacturer: Gibson
- Period: 2008–2010

Construction
- Body type: Solid, Single Cut
- Neck joint: Set-in
- Scale: 24.75"

Woods
- Body: Mahogany, Maple Top
- Neck: Mahogany
- Fretboard: Ebony

Hardware
- Bridge: Tune-o-matic
- Pickup(s): A Burstbucker 3 humbucker at the bridge, P-90H at the neck, and a piezoelectric built into the bridge.

Colors available
- Exclusive nitrocellulose finish consisting of dark red on the Maple body top; glossy finish on body top and headstock face, satin finish everywhere else.

The Gibson Dark Fire is a variant of the Les Paul. It was a second generation Robot Guitar, using an updated version of the Powertune self-tuning system produced by Tronical Gmbh. The Dark Fire also introduced Gibson's Chameleon Tone Technology, a system consisting of onboard electronics designed to simulate various guitar tones. Additionally, the guitar included an audio interface called the Robot Interface Pack or RIP.

==== Pickups ====
The Dark Fire had one Burstbucker 3 humbucker in the bridge position, a P-90H at the neck, and a special Tronical-designed piezoelectric tune-o-matic sat in place of the bridge. The Burstbucker 3 and P-90H were selected via the three-way selector switch. The piezoelectric could be activated via the MCK, blending the magnetic and piezoelectric together under a standard 1/4" guitar cable. Gibson supplied a TRS stereo cable that allowed the piezo signal and the magnetic signal to be split between two different amps.

=== Epiphone Les Paul ===
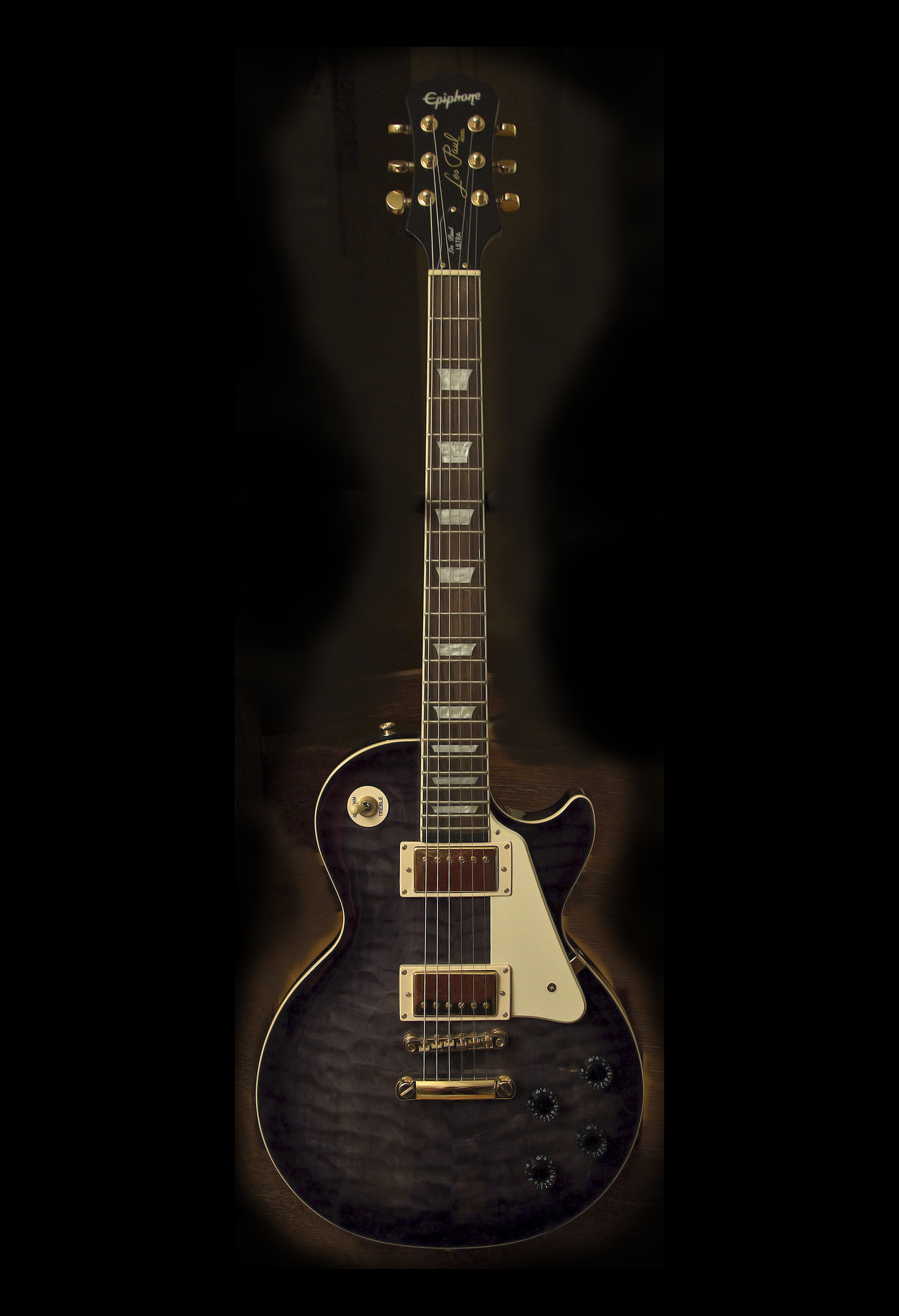
An Epiphone-branded Les Paul Ultra II

Gibson also sells Les Paul guitars under their Epiphone brand of low-cost instruments; most are similar copies of Gibson-branded models. Made outside the United States, the Epiphone Les Pauls are made from more commonly available woods using less expensive foreign labor and have less hand detailing than the Gibson models, and as a result sell for a lower price. Epiphone has been owned by Gibson Guitars since the 1950s.

Epiphone also makes several less common models of the Les Paul such as the Les Paul Goth, Les Paul Ultra/Ultra II, Les Paul Prophecy, and Les Paul Tribute Plus.

== Signature models ==
=== Jimmy Page ===
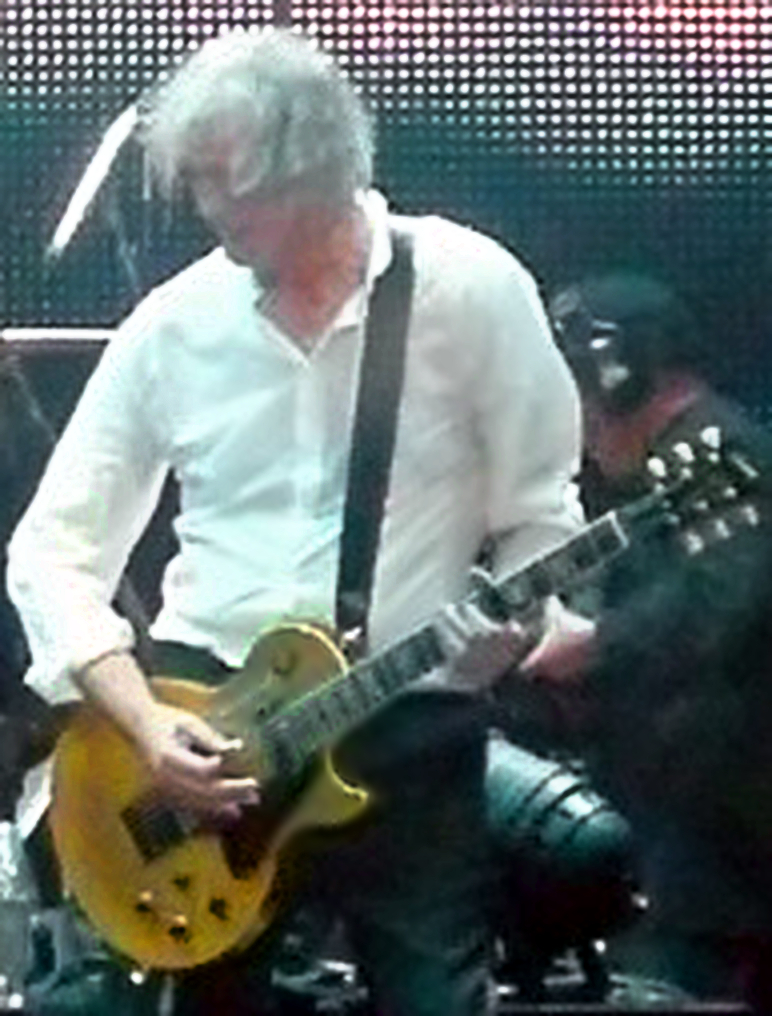
Jimmy Page with a Goldtop Classic Premium, one of his many Les Pauls

Gibson has produced three Jimmy Page signature models. The first was issued in the mid-1990s. It is based on a stock sunburst Les Paul Standard. In 2005, the Gibson Custom Shop issued a limited run of Jimmy Page Signature guitars based on Page's 1959 "No. 1". Several years later, Gibson issued its third Jimmy Page Signature guitar, this one based on Page's #2, issued in a production run of 325 guitars.

=== Gary Moore ===
Gary Moore created his own signature Les Paul in the early 2000s, characterised by a yellow flame top, no binding and signature truss rod cover. It featured two open-topped humbucker pickups, one with "zebra coils" (one white and one black bobbin). In 2009, Gibson released another Gary Moore signature guitar, the Gibson Gary Moore BFG Les Paul. The Gary Moore BFG is much like their previous Les Paul BFG series, with the added styling of Moore's various 1950s Les Paul Standards.

=== Slash ===
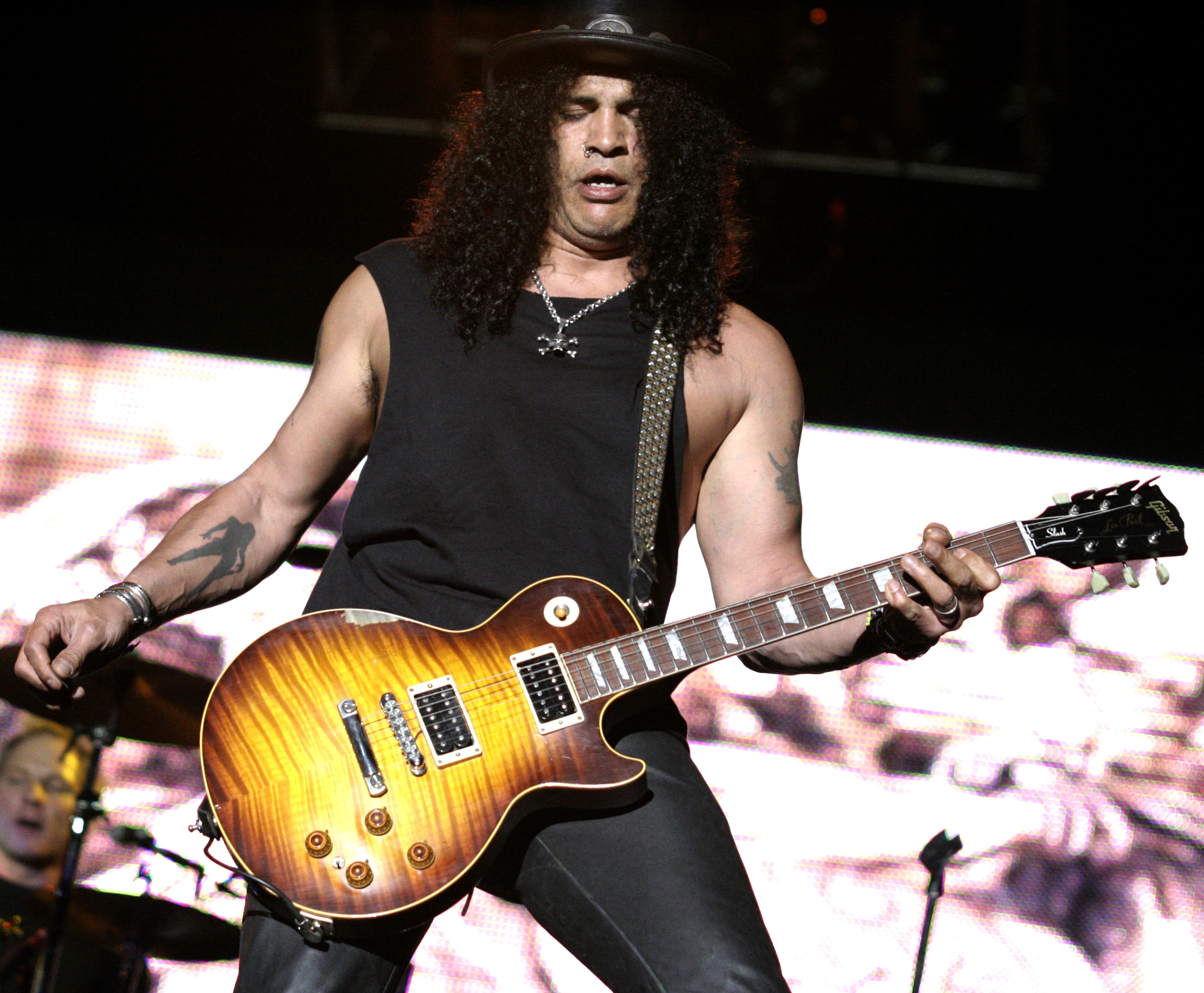
Slash with one of his signatures in 2007

Slash has collaborated with Gibson on seventeen signature Les Paul models.

The first of these guitars is the Slash "Snakepit" Les Paul Standard, which was introduced by the Gibson Custom Shop in 1996, based on the smoking snake graphic off the cover of Slash's Snakepit's debut album It's Five O'Clock Somewhere, and a mother of pearl snake inlay covering the length of the ebony fretboard. An Epiphone version was released as well. Production was limited to 100.

In 2004, the Gibson Custom Shop introduced the Slash Signature Les Paul Standard, a guitar that Gibson has used ever since as the "standard" non-limited edition Slash Les Paul. In 2008, Gibson USA released the Slash Signature Les Paul Standard Plus Top, an authentic replica of one of two Les Pauls Slash received from Gibson in 1988. It has an Antique Vintage Sunburst finish over a solid mahogany body with a maple top. An Epiphone version was released as well. Also in 2008, the Gibson Custom Shop introduced the Slash "Inspired By" Les Paul Standard. This guitar is a replica of his 1987 Les Paul Standard.

In 2010, Gibson released the Slash "AFD/Appetite for Destruction" Les Paul Standard II as a tribute to Guns N' Roses' debut album, Appetite for Destruction, which resembles the Kris Derrig-built 1959 Les Paul replica Slash used for the recording of the album. Production was limited to 400, with 100 aged guitars signed by Slash, and another 300 finished with the Custom Shop's VOS process. An Epiphone version was simultaneously released as well.

In 2013, Gibson and Epiphone both released the Slash "Rosso Corsa" Les Paul Standard, and also the Gibson USA's Slash "Vermillion" Les Paul Standard. In the year of 2017, Gibson released Slash "Anaconda Burst" Les Paul, which consist of both a Plain Top, as well as a Flame Top. An Epiphone version of the guitar was released as well. In 2017, Gibson Custom Shop released the Slash Firebird, a guitar which is a radical departure from the Les Paul style association he is well known for. The finish was produced in only two separate colors, which is Trans Black and Trans White. Only 50 copies of each color were produced.

=== Joe Perry ===
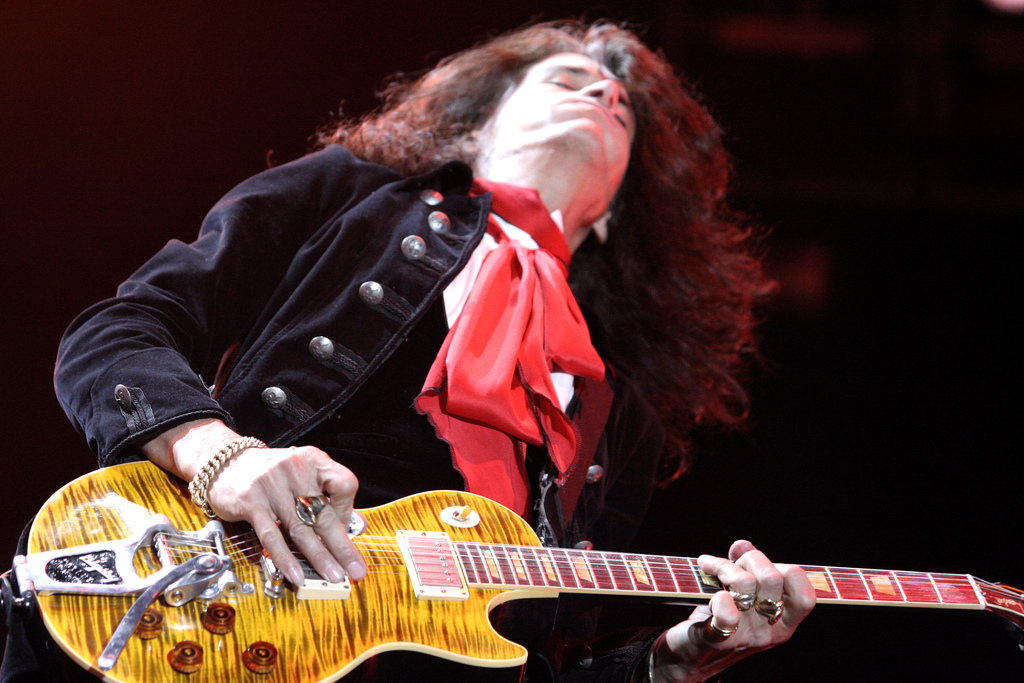
Joe Perry playing his signature "Boneyard" Les Paul

Gibson has issued two signature Les Paul guitars for Joe Perry of Aerosmith. The first was developed in 1996 and was customized with an active mid-boost control, black chrome hardware, and a translucent black finish. It was replaced in 2004 by a second, more visually distinctive Les Paul, the "Boneyard" Les Paul. This guitar is characterized by Perry's custom "Boneyard" logo on the headstock and a figured maple top with a green tiger finish, and is available with either a stop bar tailpiece or a Bigsby tailpiece.

Joe Perry owned a 1959 Gibson Les Paul Standard. Perry is not sure how, but he lost track of his 1959 Les Paul in 1982. When he wanted to get the guitar back it was in the possession of Slash (which he later used in the music video for November Rain). Perry asked if he could buy back the guitar but Slash refused. Perry continued to ask about the guitar from time to time, and eventually received the guitar back from Slash as a 50th birthday present in 2000.

=== Peter Frampton ===
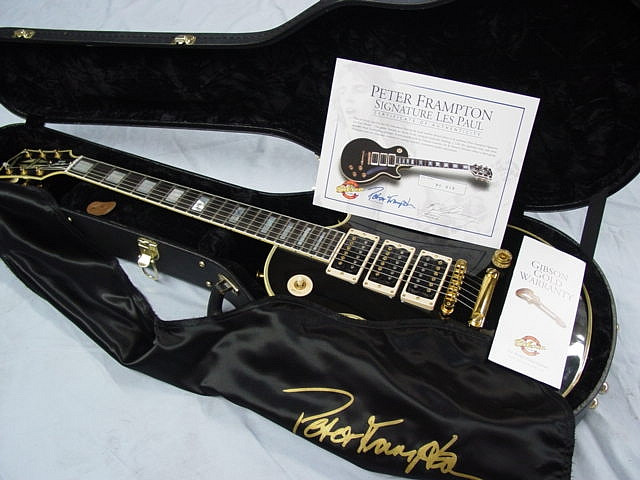
Peter Frampton '54 Custom

A replica of the three-pickup "Black Beauty" Les Paul Custom used by Peter Frampton as his main guitar from his days in Humble Pie through his early solo career was introduced through the Gibson Custom Shop in 2012. Frampton's original guitar was a 1954 Les Paul modified extensively. His guitar was presumed lost in a South American plane crash in 1980, but was returned to Frampton in 2011.

=== Mike Bloomfield ===
Gibson used hundreds of photographs of the late blues guitarist's instrument to produce the limited-edition Bloomfield signature. The company produced one hundred Bloomfield models with custom-aged finishes and two hundred more with the company's VOS finishing in 2009. They reproduced the tailpiece crack on the aged version, plus the mismatched volume and tone control knobs and the "Les Paul"-engraved truss rod cover on both versions, while including a toggle switch cover. The headstock was characterized by the kidney-shaped Grover tuning keys installed on the guitar before Bloomfield traded for it.

=== Pete Townshend ===
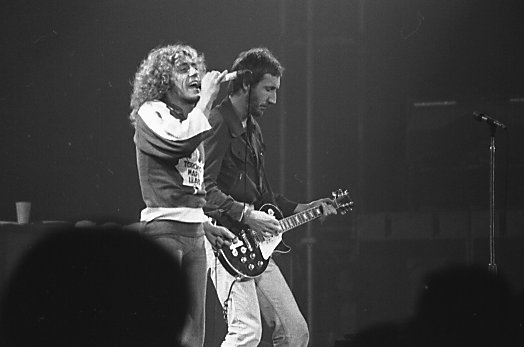
Roger Daltrey & Pete Townshend with his modified Les Paul Deluxe

In 2005, Gibson issued three Pete Townshend signature edition Les Paul Deluxe guitars, based on Townshend's heavily customised "#1" Wine Red 1976 Les Paul Deluxe, "#3" Gold top 1976, and "#9" Cherry Sunburst 1976. These guitars were modified by Alan Rogan and used extensively on stage and in the studio with The Who. In addition to the two mini-humbuckers the guitar carried, Rogan modified Townshend's originals with a DiMarzio humbucker in the middle. Toggle switches located behind the guitar's tailpiece turned the pickup on and off and added volume boost. The control knobs were wired for volume, one for each pickup and a master tone. The reissues differed from Townshend's originals in that the reissues had an inlay at the first fret while the originals did not.

=== Ace Frehley ===
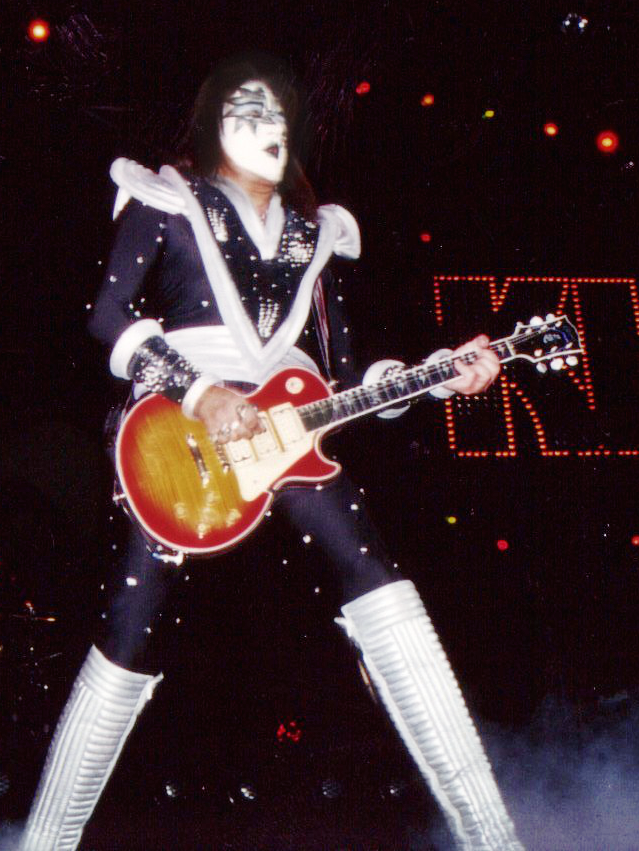
Ace Frehley with his 3-pickup Les Paul Custom

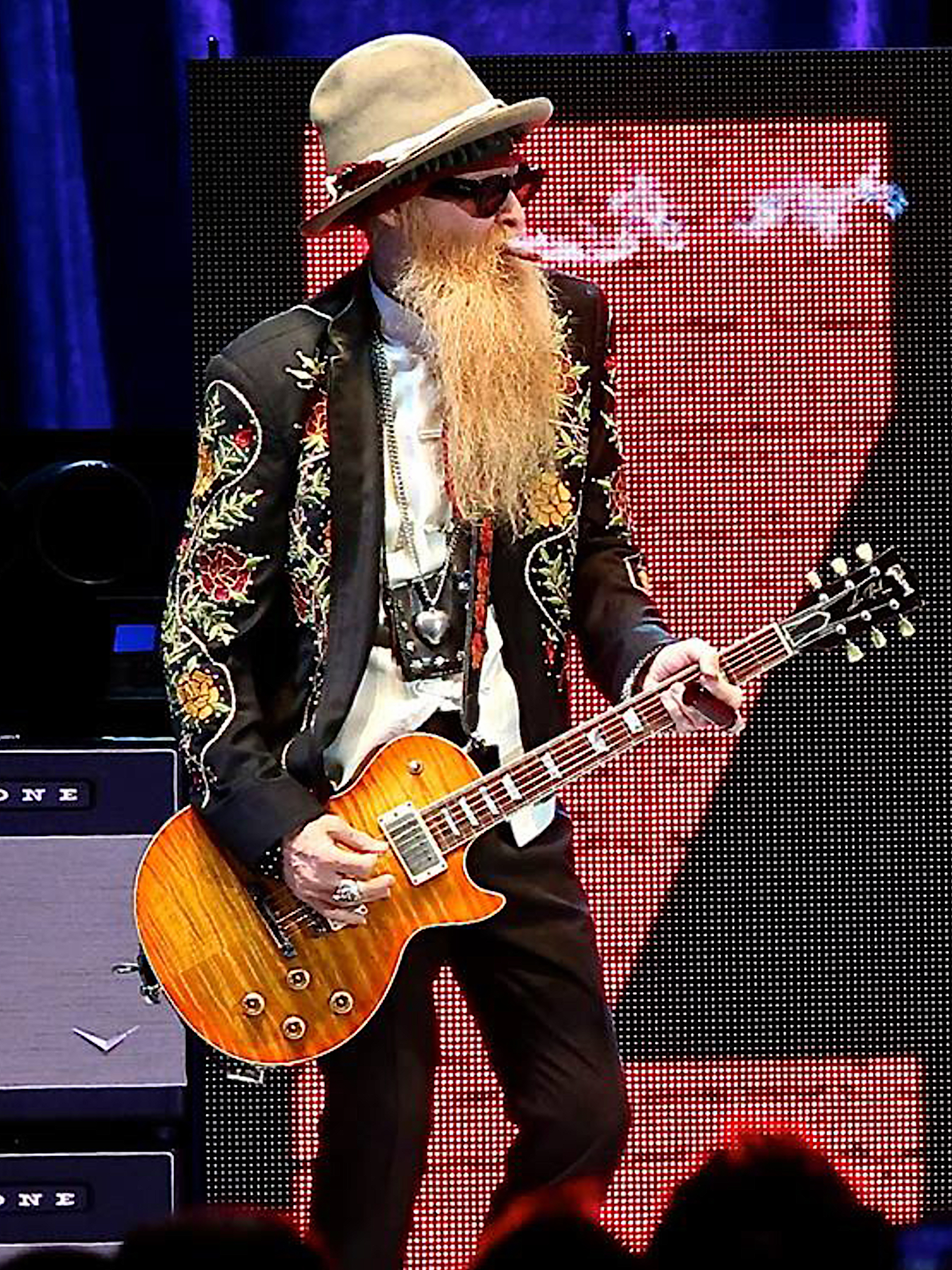
Billy Gibbons with a Les Paul

The Ace Frehley signature model (released in 1997 and re-released in 2012) has three double-cream DiMarzio pickups, a cherry sunburst finish (AAAA), a color image of Frehley's face in his Kiss make-up on the headstock, mother-of-pearl lightning bolt inlays, and Frehley's simulated signature on the 12th fret. A Custom Shop run of only 300 guitars were built with DiMarzio PAF, Super Distortion, and Dual Sound pickups. The production run model was only built with DiMarzio Super Distortion pickups. This was one of Gibson's best selling artist runs. The more recent 2012 "Budokan" model, intended to pay tribute to the guitar used during the Kiss' first trip to Japan in 1977, features mother-of-pearl block inlays (no signature at the 12th fret), Grover machine heads with pearloid banjo buttons, and a grade A maple top.

=== Billy Gibbons ===
Billy Gibbons of ZZ Top has a signature model, featuring his signature Seymour Duncan pickup set, based on his "Pearly Gates" 1959 Les Paul Standard.

=== Eric Clapton ===
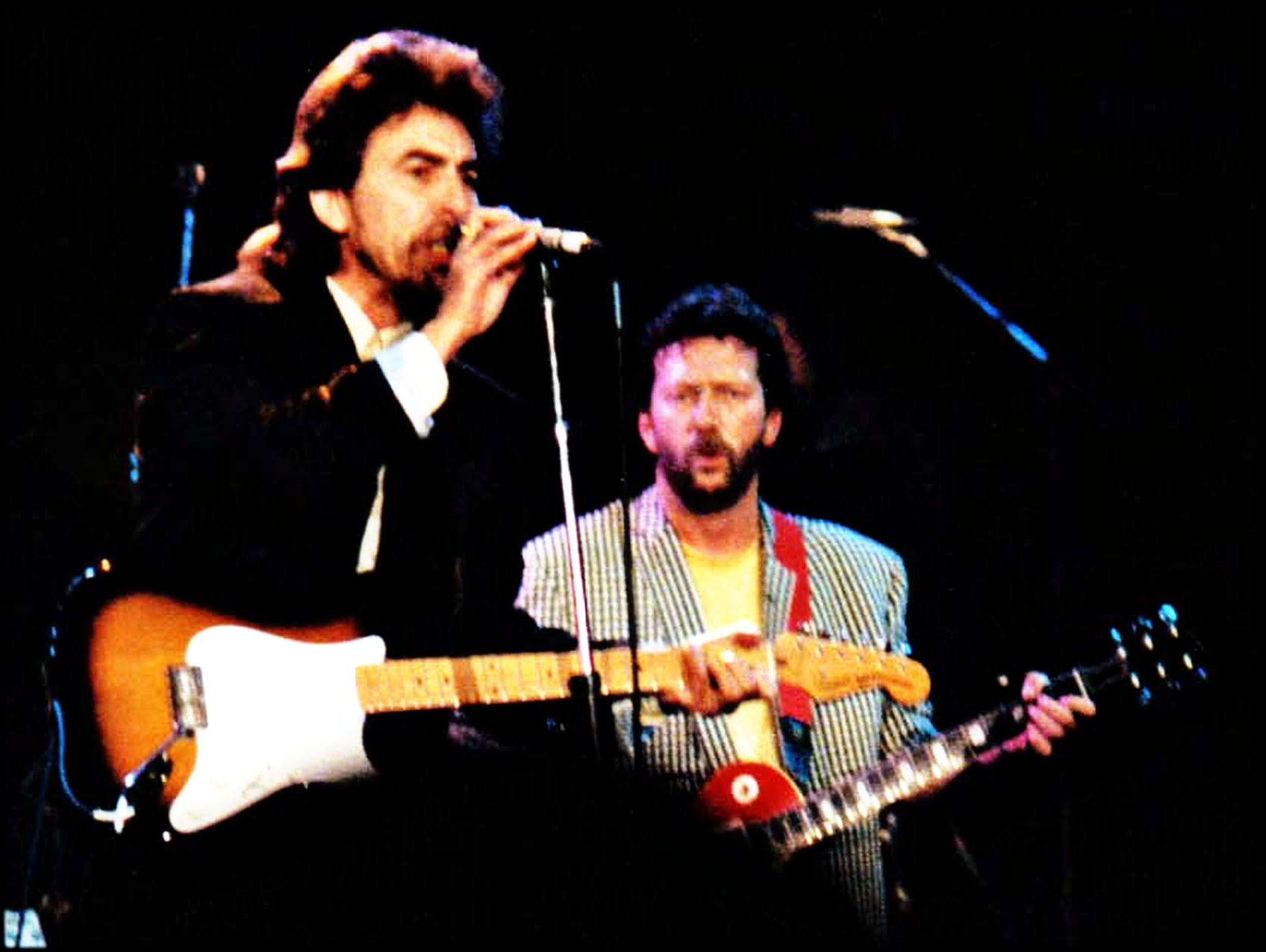
Eric Clapton playing a Les Paul in 1987, to the right of George Harrison

Clapton played a 1960 Standard as a member of John Mayall & the Bluesbreakers as well as in the early days of Cream. The guitar was said to have been stolen while Clapton was preparing for the first Cream tour in 1966, following the recording of Fresh Cream, and was long considered an iconic instrument by Clapton's fans. Gibson announced production of the Clapton 1960 Standard, also nicknamed the "Beano Burst", in 2010. Gibson says the instrument "accurately represents what Eric Clapton personally feels his 1960 Les Paul should be", with Clapton consulting on the design of the guitar. Production is limited but all feature period-correct hardware, two Gibson reproduction PAF humbucking pickups, and subtly figured "antiquity burst" maple tops.

=== Mark Knopfler ===
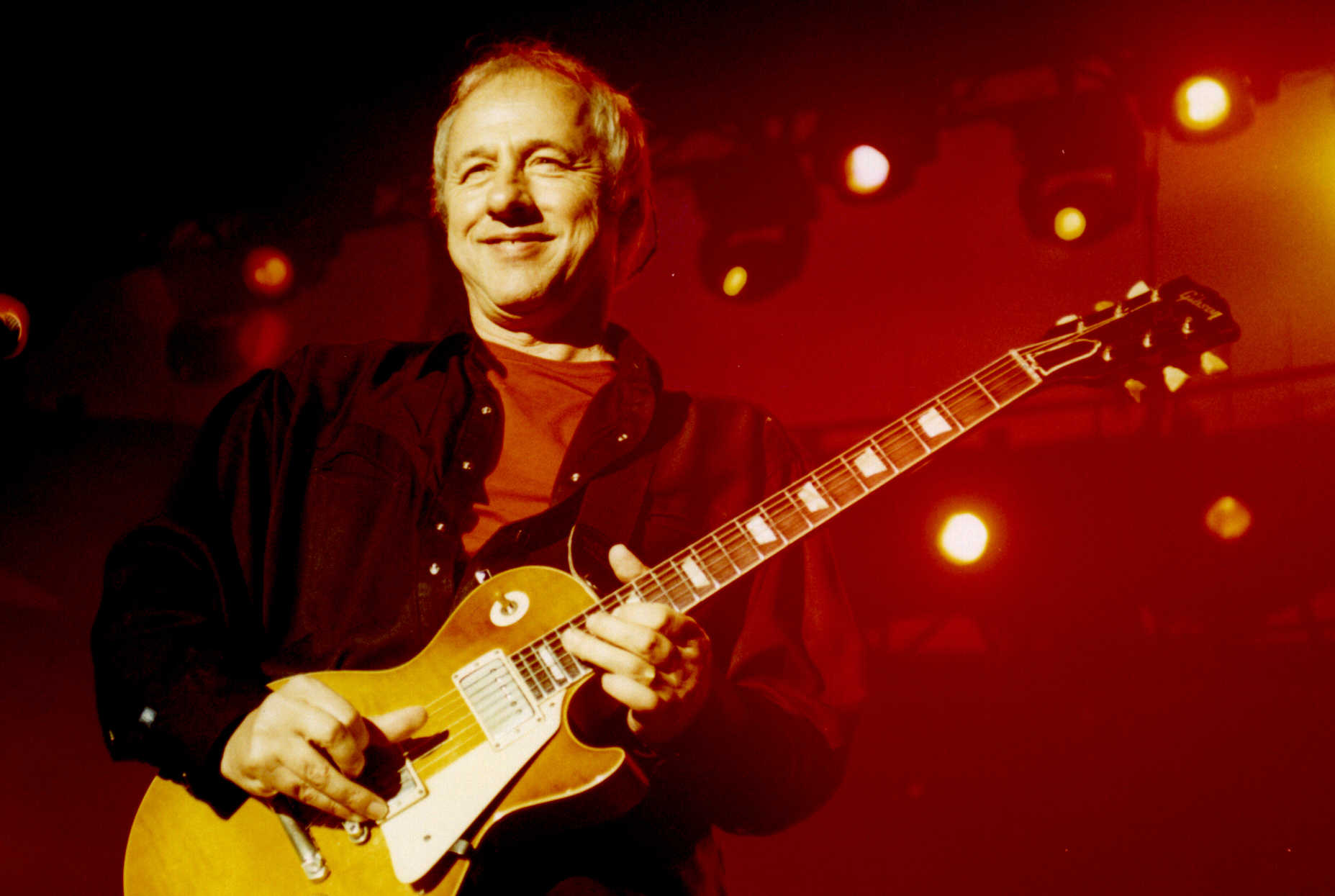
Mark Knopfler playing a Les Paul

Mark Knopfler of Dire Straits played a 1958 Les Paul on tracks such as "Money for Nothing", having used it both in the studio and live on stage. In 2016, Gibson released a signature model of his 1958 Les Paul Standard.

=== Paul Kossoff ===
Paul Kossoff, of Free and Back Street Crawler, favored a 1959 Les Paul Standard. In 2011–12, Gibson's Custom Shop made a reproduction of Kossoff's Standard, featuring a so-called "green-lemon" flametop, two-piece carved maple top, mahogany body and neck, Custom Bucker humbucking pickups and kidney-bean shaped Grover tuners similar to those Kossoff had installed on the instrument. One hundred Kossoff models were made to resemble the guitar at the time of Kossoff's death in 1976, with another 250 in a VOS finish.

=== Marc Bolan ===
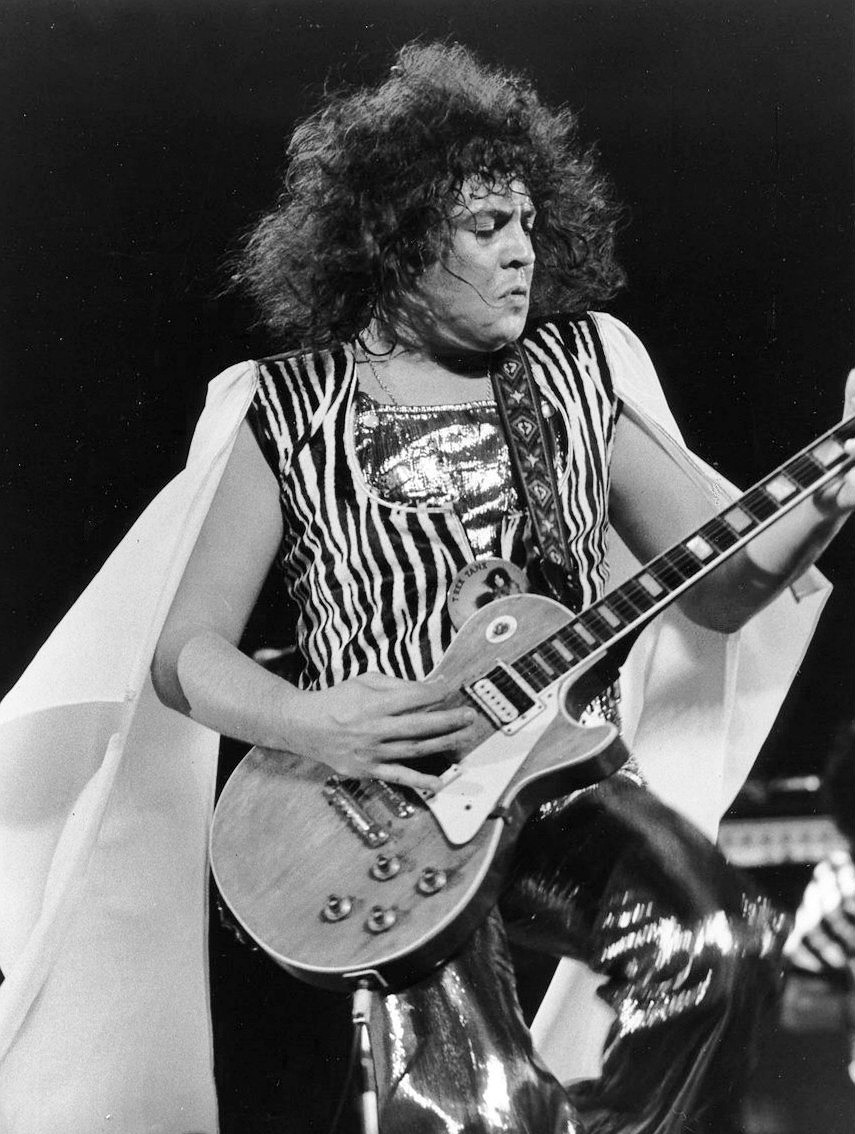
Marc Bolan playing a Les Paul

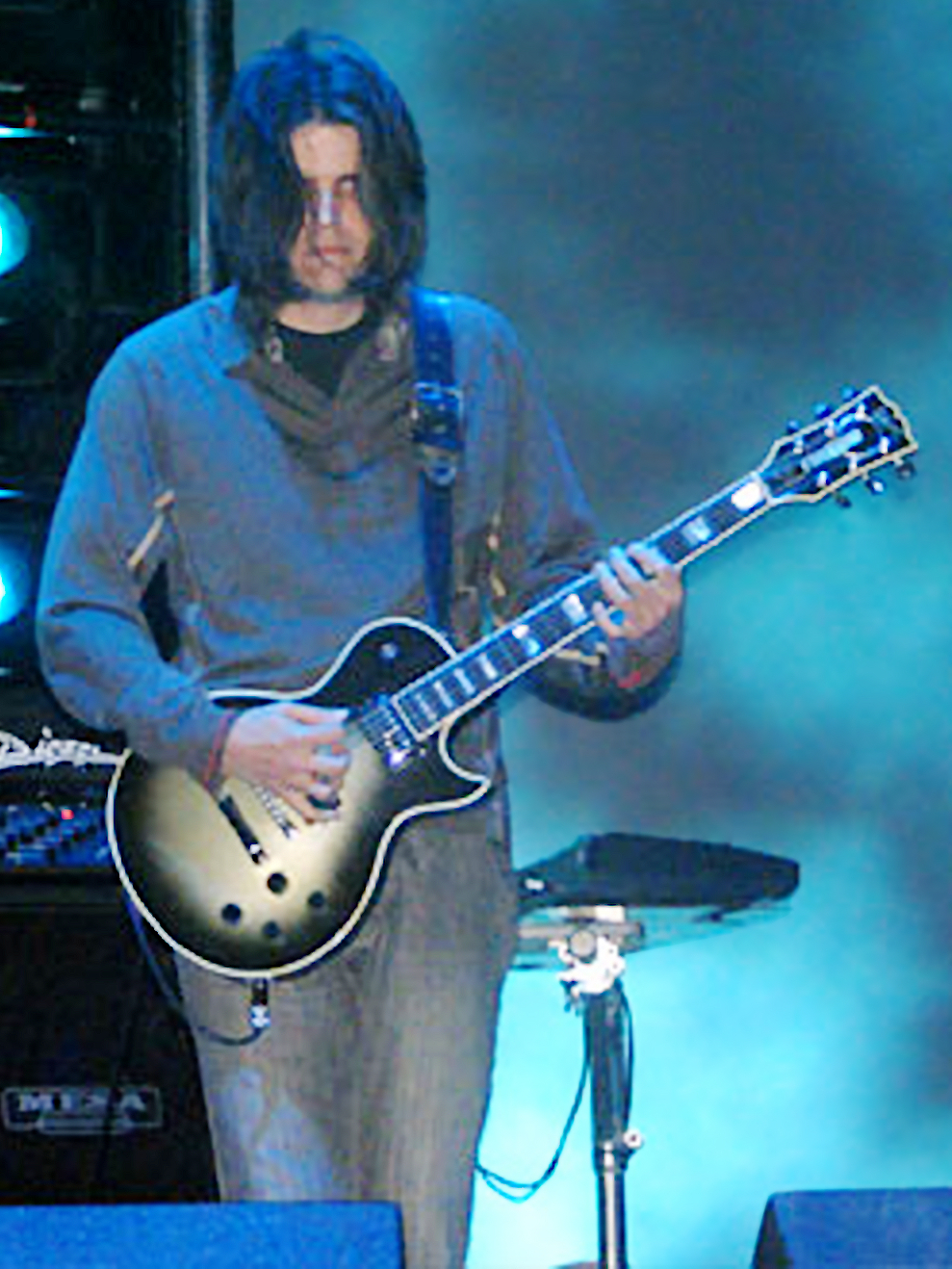
Adam Jones playing a Les Paul

Marc Bolan of T.Rex played a late-50s Les Paul, potentially a stripped Goldtop, later refitted with a Les Paul Custom neck. Gibson recreated this unique guitar in 2011, producing 450 examples including 100 hand-aged, numbered versions and 350 utilising the vintage original spec process. The guitars are notable for the custom-made PAF-reproduction uncovered humbucker pickups. The guitars feature a custom finish, referred to by Gibson as "Bolan chablis".

=== Adam Jones ===
Adam Jones of Tool has played a 1979 Silverburst Les Paul since the bands inception. The guitars themselves were created for a short amount of time. Jones said in an interview in 1995 that he once owned 5 at a time. In June 2020, Adam Jones announced via his Instagram that a signature model made by Gibson based on his guitar was in production. Two different models were made: a custom version that was sold for a limited time and a standard version which is more readily available. Jones later teased an Epiphone signature in 2021 of the same guitar, which was first released in December 2022 as one of seven collectible versions featuring visual art at the back.

=== Noel Gallagher ===
When Oasis launched their 2025 reunion tour, lead guitarist Noel Gallagher took to the stage with a "mystery guitar," a Les Paul model recognizable for its aged ebony finish and unique nickel-covered soapbar P-90 pickups. The guitar, Gibson said, had been developed over more than a year and a half and was based on a 1960 Les Paul Standard model. In August 2025, Gibson released a limited production of the guitar, called the Custom Noel Gallagher Les Paul Standard. Only 25 were made, each representing a song from Oasis' setlist and accompanied by a sheet of lyrics handwritten and signed by Gallagher. Gibson released a non-limited production model, the Gibson Noel Gallagher Les Paul Standard, later that year.

== Les Paul copies and lawsuits ==
Although early Les Paul imitations in the 1960s and 1970s, such as those made by Höfner, Hagström, Harmony Company, and Greco differed from Gibson's designs, with different electronics and even bolt-on necks, in the late 1970s some Japanese companies came very close to perfecting copies of the original 1958–1960 Standards.

A lawsuit was brought by the Norlin Corporation (the parent company of Gibson) in 1977, against Elger/Hoshino U.S.A. (manufacturer and distributor, respectively, of Ibanez) over the use a headstock shape and logo, both considered similar to the Gibson designs. However, the suit was based on an Ibanez headstock design that had been discontinued by 1976. The case was officially closed on February 2, 1978. These mid-1970s guitars later became known as "lawsuit era" guitars.

ESP Guitars makes several guitars based on the Les Paul design. The Edwards and Navigator lines are made in Japan in the vein of the late 1970s and 1980s guitars from Tokai, Burny, and Greco, complete with Gibson style headstocks.

Heritage Guitars, founded in 1985 by four long-time Gibson employees when Gibson relocated to Nashville, continues to build guitars at the original factory in Kalamazoo, Michigan. Many of their models are inspired by Gibson's late-1950s/early-1960s sunbursts and Customs.

In 2006, Gibson lost a lawsuit against PRS Guitars, Gibson claiming PRS was infringing on the Les Paul shape and design. The court's decision allowed PRS to reintroduce single cutaway versions of its instruments.

In 2008, Gibson lost the trademark for the Les Paul in Finland. According to the court, "Les Paul" has become a common noun for guitars of a certain type. The lawsuit began when Gibson sued Musamaailma, which produces Tokai guitars, for trademark violation. However, several witnesses testified that the term "Les Paul" denotes character in a guitar rather than a particular guitar model. The court also found it aggravating that Gibson had used Les Paul in the plural form and that the importer of Gibson guitars had used Les Paul as a common noun.

== See also ==
- Gibson ES series
- Gibson Les Paul Doublecut
- Gibson Les Paul Junior
- Gibson ES Les Paul
- Gibson SG
- Gibson Les Paul Bass
