= Knott (surname) =

The surname Knott has several origins. The English-language surname is derived from the Middle English personal name Knut, a cognate of the Old Norse personal name Knútr, which is in turn derived from knútr ("knot"). The surname Knott is also a variant spelling of the German-language surname Knoth, which is derived from the Middle High German knode, knote ("knot").

== People ==
- Knott family (lighthouse keepers)
- Alan Knott (born 1946), English cricketer
- Aloysius Leo Knott (died 1918), American politician, lawyer and educator
- Andrew Knott (born 1979), English actor
- Annie M. Knott (1850–1941), prominent Scottish-born Christian Scientist
- Bert Knott (1914–1986), English footballer
- Bill Knott (politician) (1921–2013), Australian politician
- Bill Knott (poet) (1940–2014), American poet
- Bill Knott (footballer) (active in 1922), footballer from New Zealand
- Blanche Knott, American author
- Brad Knott, American attorney and politician
- Cara Knott (1966–1986), American student murdered by a law enforcement officer
- Cargill Gilston Knott (1856–1922), Scottish physicist, mathematician and seismologist
- Charles Knott (1914–2003), English cricketer
- Joanna Saleeby Knott, American businesswoman and golfer
- Charles Harold Knott, known as John Knott, (1901–1988), English cricketer
- Joseph Thomas Knott (born 1951), American lawyer
- J. T. Knott (born 1926), American politician
- Dan Knott (1879–1959), Canadian labour activist and politician
- Darren Knott, British disc jockey and record producer
- Edward Knott (1582–1656), English Jesuit controversialist
- Eleanor Knott MRIA (1886–1975), an Irish scholar, academic and lexicographer
- Eric Knott (born 1974), American baseball player
- Francis Knott, British athlete during the 1908 Summer Olympics
- Freddie Knott (1891–1972), English cricketer
- Frederick Knott (1916–2002), English playwright
- George Knott (1910–2001), Australian athlete and politician
- Ian Knott, English rugby league footballer who played in the 1990s and 2000s
- Ian Knott, New Zealand technology writer
- J. Proctor Knott (1830–1911), Governor of Kentucky
- Jack Knott (1907–1981), American baseball player
- Sir James Knott, 1st Baronet (1855–1934), English shipping magnate and politician
- James Knott (born 1975), English cricketer, the son of Alan Knott
- John Knott (disambiguation), multiple people
- Jon Knott (born 1978), American baseball player
- Kristina Knott (born 1995), Filipino-American sprinter
- Lydia Knott (1866–1955), American actress of the silent era
- Kathleen Knott (born 1987), Australian netball player
- Nick Knott (1920–1987), Canadian ice hockey player
- Michael Knott, American singer-songwriter
- Percy Knott, English footballer in the 1920s
- Peter Knott (1956–2015), Australian politician
- Ralph Knott (1878–1929), British architect
- Sidney Knott (1933–2020), South African cricketer
- Stuart R. Knott (1859–1943), the fourth president of Kansas City Southern Railway
- Walter Knott (1889–1981), American farmer who created the Knott's Berry Farm amusement park

== See also ==
- Knotts, a surname
- Nott (disambiguation)
