= John Nott (disambiguation) =

John Nott (1932–2024) was a British Conservative politician.

John Nott may also refer to:

- John Nott, chef to the Duke of Bolton, author of The Cooks and Confectioners Dictionary (1723)
- John Nott (physician) (1751–1825), English physician and classical scholar
- John Nott, 14th-century Lord Mayor of London

== See also ==
- Jon Knott (born 1978), American baseball player
- John A. Notte Jr. (1909–1983), governor of Rhode Island
- John Knott (disambiguation)
