= United States v. Pineda-Moreno =

- Court: United States Court of Appeals for the Ninth Circuit
- Full case name: United States of America v. Juan Pineda-Moreno
- Argued: October 5, 2009
- Decided: January 11, 2010
- Citation: 591 F.3d 1212

Case history
- Subsequent history: • Rehearing en banc denied, 617 F.3d 1120 (2010) • Reversed by the Supreme Court and remanded. • Doctrine overruled in 2012.

Holding
- Law Enforcement may use a GPS tracer on a vehicle, even if the vehicle is on one's driveway.

Court membership
- Judges sitting: Diarmuid F. O'Scannlain, N. Randy Smith, Charles R. Wolle (S.D. Iowa)

Case opinions
- Majority: O'Scannlain, joined by Smith, Wolle
- Dissent: Alex Kozinski (dissenting from denial of rehearing en banc), joined by Stephen Reinhardt, Kim McLane Wardlaw, Richard A. Paez, Marsha Berzon
- Dissent: Reinhardt (dissenting from denial of rehearing en banc)

Laws applied
- U.S. Const. amend. IV
- Overruled by
- United States v. Jones, U.S. Supreme Court; United States v. Pineda-Moreno, 9th Circuit (2012)

United States v. Pineda-Moreno, 591 F.3d 1212 (2010) was a 2010 Ninth Circuit Court of Appeals case regarding the use of GPS devices. The court ruled that placing a GPS tracking device on a personal vehicle without a warrant did not violate a suspect's Fourth Amendment rights, even if the vehicle was parked in the defendant's driveway at the time the device was placed. The case was reversed and remanded by the United States Supreme Court in light of United States v. Jones.

== Background ==
Juan Pineda-Moreno came under suspicion by the Drug Enforcement Administration after he was spotted purchasing a number of supplies used in the production of marijuana. During their four-month investigation of Pineda-Moreno, the agents repeatedly placed GPS tracking devices on the undercarriage of his car. On most of these occasions, the agents placed the device while the vehicle was parked in a public area, but on two occasions, the car was parked in the defendant's driveway, and the agents entered his property between 4 and 5 am in order to place the device.

== Decision ==
The court ruled that, because the devices were not used to intrude into a constitutionally protected area, their use did not constitute an impermissible search. Furthermore, the device did not allow what would otherwise be an impermissible or impossible search to take place, and instead allowed law enforcement to act more efficiently.

The court also ruled that intruding into the defendant's driveway did not make the search any more intrusive or impermissible, as the driveway "is only a semi-private area". Since the driveway is visible from the street, and serves as an entrance to the house for those who might, for example, deliver a newspaper to the house, there is no expectation of privacy in the area.

== Dissent ==
When Pineda-Moreno's appealed for a rehearing en banc was denied, Chief Judge Alex Kozinski wrote a dissent discussing the merits of his argument, and was joined by three other judges. The majority of the opinion is devoted to expressing concern that the court has so limited the privacy enjoyed within the area of the home, noting that just because an uninvited child might run into a private individual's driveway does not mean that the police automatically gain that privilege. He also argues that poor people are often unable to place the protections, such as an electronic fence or closed underground garage, around one's private parking area that the court would require in order to gain privacy in such an area. The constitution is not supposed to only protect the rich over the poor.

He further argues that the reliance on United States v. Knotts was inappropriate, as GPS technology is so vastly superior to the beeper technology used in the 1980s. Whereas the technology used in Knotts required the police to maintain close, near visual, surveillance of the vehicle being tracked, there is no such requirement for GPS devices. The panel holds that the government can obtain this information without implicating the 4th amendment because an individual has no reasonable expectation of privacy in his movements through public spaces where he might be observed by an actual or hypothetical observer. This means that GPS devices (cell phones, on star etc.) used to track and record the movements of millions of individuals can be used by the police to detect patterns and develop suspicions. Kozinski says that there is something "creepy and un-American about such clandestine and underhanded behavior".

== See also ==
- Kyllo v. United States
- Katz v. United States
- United States v. Garcia
- United States v. Knotts
- United States v. Jones
