= Nott =

Nott may refer to:

== People ==
- Abraham Nott (1768–1830), a United States Representative
- Charles Stanley Nott, an author
- Charles Cooper Nott (disambiguation), two New York judges
- Eliphalet Nott, President of Union College and Rensselaer Polytechnic Institute
- Ernie Nott (1902-1954), British motorcycle racer
- Frederick Lancelot Nott, Member of the Queensland Legislative Assembly
- George Nott, English rugby player
- Henry Nott (1774–1844), Protestant missionary to Tahiti
- John Nott (1932–2024), a politician
- John Nott (physician) (1751–1825), English physician and classical scholar
- Jonathan Nott, a conductor
- Josiah C. Nott, a physician
- Julian Nott, a film composer
- Julian Nott (balloonist) (1944–2019), British-born American balloonist
- Kathleen Nott, a writer
- Lewis Nott, member of the Australian House of Representatives
- Mike Nott, American football player
- Peleg Nott (fl. late 18th century), African American leader
- Peter Nott (1933–2018), Bishop of Norwich from 1985 to 1999
- Samuel Nott, American missionary to India
- Tara Nott (born 1972), American weightlifter
- William Nott, a military leader

== Other ==
- Nótt, the personification of night in Norse mythology
- Theodore Nott, a character in the Harry Potter book series
- Nott Memorial at Union College
- Nott the Brave, a goblin rogue in the D&D Web Series Critical Role

== See also ==
- Notts (disambiguation)
