= NOTS =

NOTS may refer to

- Naval Ordnance Test Station of Naval Air Weapons Station China Lake, US
- Naval Overseas Transportation Service of pre-1949 US Military Sealift Command
- Negros Oriental Trade School of Negros Oriental State University, Philippines
- New Era Dianetics for OTs, an Operating Thetan level in Scientology
- Nots (band), a noise punk band
- NBC Owned Television Stations

== See also ==
- Knot (disambiguation)
