= Knott =

Knott or The Knott may refer to:

== Places ==
- Knott, Caldbeck, a mountain in the northern part of the English Lake District
- The Knott, a mountain in the eastern part of the English Lake District
- Knott, Skye, a location in Highland, Scotland
- Knott, Texas, community in the state of Texas, United States
- Knott County, Kentucky, county in the state of Kentucky, United States
- Knott Hall, residence hall at the University of Notre Dame
- Knott Arena, sports arena at Mount Saint Mary's University, in Emmitsburg, Maryland, United States
- The Knott (Stickle Pike), summit near Stickle Pike, south-western Lake District, England
- The Knott (Stainton Pike), summit near Stainton Pike, south-western Lake District, England

== People ==
- Knott (surname)

== See also ==
- Knott End-on-Sea, Lancashire, England
- Knotts
- Knott's (disambiguation)
- Knot (disambiguation)
- The Knot (disambiguation)
