= Knot (disambiguation) =

A knot is a fastening in rope or interwoven lines.

Knot or knots may also refer to:

== Other common meanings ==
- Knot (unit), of speed
- Knot (wood), a timber imperfection

== Arts, entertainment, and media ==
=== Films ===
- Knots (film), a 2004 film
- Knots, a 2011 film starring Kimberly-Rose Wolter

=== Music ===
- Rosette (music), soundhole decoration on string instruments
- Knots (Sons of Noel and Adrian album), a 2012 album by Sons of Noel and Adrian
- Knots (Crash of Rhinos album), a 2013 album by Crash of Rhinos
- Knots (EP), a 2018 extended play by Moira Dela Torre and Nieman Gatus
- "Knots", a song by Gentle Giant

=== Other uses in arts, entertainment, and media ===
- KNOT, a radio station in Prescott, Arizona, United States
- Knots, a 1970 book of poetry by R. D. Laing

== Biology ==
- Red knot, a wading bird (simply called "knot" in Europe)
- Great knot, a wading bird
- Trigger point or knot, a small, hard, tender spot in a muscle
- Bulbus glandis or knot, an erectile swelling on a canid penis

== Mathematics ==
- Knot (mathematics), an abstract representation of an interwoven linear object
- Knot (graph theory), an inescapable section of a directed graph
- Knot, a point on a spline at which different segments meet

== Other uses ==
- Knot, Nancowry, a village in India
- Heraldic knot, used in European heraldry
- Knot (papermaking), a clump of fibres in paper pulp
- Knot DNS, software
- Cometary knot, in planetary nebulae

== See also ==
- Knott (disambiguation)
- Knotts, a list of people with the surname
- Celtic knot, a decorative graphic representation of a knot
- Gordian Knot, a very complex knot in Ancient Greek mythology
- Garlic knot, a bread appetiser in the shape of a knot
- Knot garden, an elaborate interlace of tightly clipped low hedging
- Knotted wrack, a seaweed
- Knotgrass or knotweed, any of the plants in the buckwheat family, Polygonaceae
- Knotting, Bedfordshire, a village in England
- Mary Untier of Knots, a Marian devotion
- The Knot (disambiguation)
