= Harlequins Cricket Club =

Cricket club formed in Oxford

Established	1852
Founders	Fellows of Merton College
- First match
First-class matches	4 (1924–1928)

The Harlequins Cricket Club is a wandering cricket club formed in 1852 by fellows of Merton College, Oxford. The club is made up exclusively of current and former Oxford University first-class cricketers; and, according to the rules of the club, only a maximum of twenty members can reside at the university at any one time. Once membership has been granted, it is for life.

Notably, rather than play in the normal "whites" associated with cricket, until the end of the 19th century the team's whole kit, and not just the cap, was coloured Oxford blue, maroon and buff.

In the 1920s, the club played four first-class fixtures, all between 1924 and 1928. Their final such game, against the West Indians at Eastbourne in late August 1928, was notable for the 261 not out scored by John Knott in the second innings.

The club no longer plays fixtures considered first class, but it does maintain annual fixtures against MCC, Hurlingham Cricket Club, and Cambridge's counterpart club, the Quidnuncs Cricket Club, as well as the Oxford University CC.
