= ES-Les Paul =

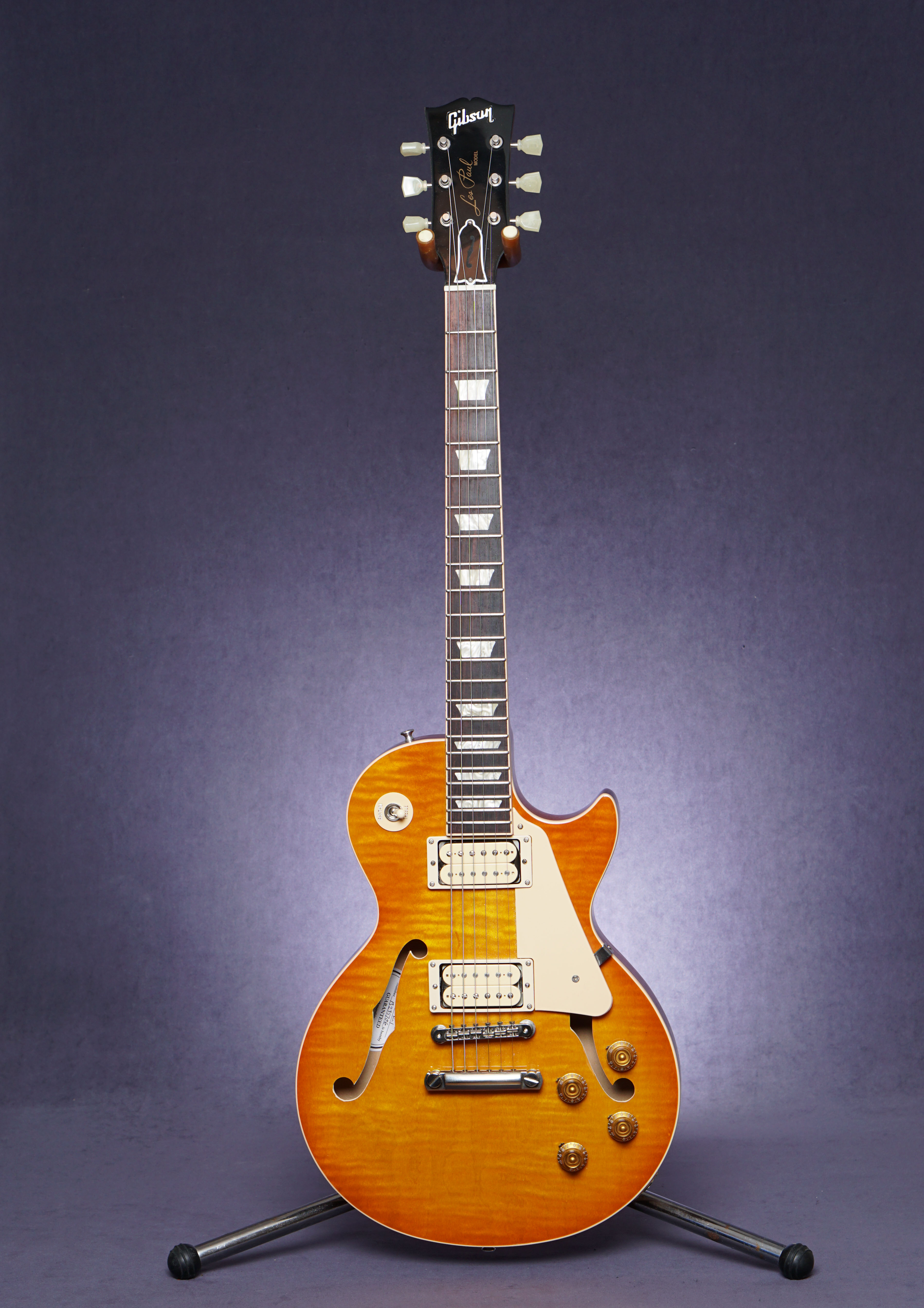
2015 Gibson Memphis ES Les Paul Lemon Burst Double Cream VOS

ES-Les Paul is a Gibson semi-hollow guitar that was produced in Memphis, Tennessee, United States from 2014 to 2016. It was produced with several different variations including a model with no f holes.

== Background ==
Gibson Les Pauls which are not hollow can weigh 8.1 lb (3.7 kg) – 9.7 lb (4.4 kg), and they have an average of 8.86 lb (4.02 kg). The Gibson guitar company wanted to create a lighter guitar by creating weight relieved guitars beginning in 1987. Creating a hollow body guitar was the culmination of Gibson's efforts to make lighter Les Pauls.

== Specifications ==
The ES-Les Paul was produced in several models, including, Memphis ES-Les Paul Black Beauty (3 pickups). They also produced the guitar in the limited ES-Les Paul with Bigsby and ES-Les Paul VOS in Lemon Burst and Goldtop. The guitars came with PAF-style Memphis Historic Spec (MHS) pickups and a rounded C-style neck shape. Most of the ES-Les Pauls came with F holes. The guitar's neck was made of mahogany and the back and sides were laminated maple/poplar with a walnut stain. There is a mahogany block running through the body making the guitar semi-hollow. The guitar is bound with aged-cream pickguard and binding, and it has a black-faced headstock.

Gibson also made a number of ES-Les Pauls without f-holes.
