= John Knott =

John Knott may refer to:

- John Knott (scientist) (1938–2017), British metallurgist
- John Knott (cricketer) (1901–1988), English cricketer for Kent and Oxford
- John Knott (public servant) (1910–1999), Australian civil servant
- John Knott (sport shooter) (1914–1965), British Olympic shooter
- John F. Knott (1878–1963) American cartoonist

== See also ==
- Jon Knott, American baseball player
- John "Jake" Knotts (born 1944), American politician
- Jonathan Nott, British Ambassador to Poland
- John Nott (disambiguation)
