= James Knott =

James Knott is the name of:

- J. Proctor Knott (1830–1911), American politician
- Sir James Knott, 1st Baronet (1852–1934), English shipping magnate and politician
- James Knott (cricketer) (born 1975), English cricketer
