= The Knot =

The Knot may refer to:

== Films ==
- The Knot (1921 film), an Italian silent film directed by Gaston Ravel
- The Knot (2006 film), a Chinese film directed by Yin Li
- The Knot (2012 film), a British film starring Noel Clarke

== Other uses ==
- The Knot (album), 2009 album from Wye Oak
- The Knot (company), former name of XO Group and several of its publications
- The Knot, a brand of Irish whiskey produced by The Knot Distillery

== See also ==
- Knot (disambiguation)
- Knott (disambiguation)
