= United States v. Garcia =

- Court: United States Court of Appeals for the Seventh Circuit
- Full case name: United States of America v. Bernardo Garcia
- Argued: January 10, 2007
- Decided: February 7, 2007

Court membership
- Judges sitting: Richard Posner, Daniel Anthony Manion, and Diane S. Sykes

United States v. Garcia was a 2007 Seventh Circuit Court of Appeals case regarding the use of GPS devices. The court ruled that placing a GPS tracking device on a personal vehicle without a warrant did not violate a suspect's Fourth Amendment rights.

== Background ==
Bernardo Garcia was previously convicted of distributing methamphetamine. Shortly after his release from prison, the police learned that he intended to begin manufacturing meth once again. They subsequently found the car he was using at the time and, without obtaining a warrant, placed a commercially available GPS tracking device on his car while it was parked in a public area. The police later retrieved the device, and used the information contained therein to locate the location where Garcia was manufacturing meth. Garcia was subsequently convicted using this information.

== Decision ==
The court ruled that placing a GPS device on Garcia's car without a warrant did not constitute a seizure or an unreasonable search, but noted that its ruling would not necessarily apply to a program of mass surveillance. The court ruled that the device did not affect the vehicle's functionality in any way, and could therefore not constitute a seizure of the vehicle. The court also noted that the use of a tracking device, as in Katz substituted for visual surveillance, which does not normally require a warrant. For this reason, the use of a GPS tracking device simply represents the use of more advanced technology for surveillance purposes, and that restricting their use would therefore serve to restrict the efficiency of law enforcement rather than protect the privacy rights of the individual. It is with this in mind that the court closes its decision by noting that a program of mass surveillance, which would be infeasible without the use of GPS devices, would not necessarily be constitutionally protected.

== See also ==
- Kyllo v. United States
- Katz v. United States
- United States v. Pineda-Moreno
- United States v. Knotts
- United States v. Jones
