= Knott's =

Knott's may refer to:

- Knott's Berry Farm, a theme park in Buena Park, California, now owned by Cedar Fair
- Knott's Berry Farm, brand name of food specialty products (jams and preserves) manufacturer, now part of The J. M. Smucker Company based in Placentia, California
- Knott's Camp Snoopy, the former name of Camp Snoopy (now Nickelodeon Universe), a theme park in the Mall of America, previously owned by Cedar Fair
- Knott's Soak City, a seasonal water park in Buena Park, California
- Knott's Scary Farm, a Halloween event in Buena Park, California.

== See also ==
- Knott (disambiguation)
- Knotts
