= George Frederick Nott =

English author and clergyman

George Frederick Nott (1767–1841) was an English author and a Church of England clergyman.

== Life ==
He was the nephew of John Nott. His father, Samuel Nott (1740–1793), M.A. from Worcester College, Oxford, in 1764, was appointed prebendary of Winchester (1770), rector of Houghton, Hampshire (1776), vicar of Blandford, Dorset, and chaplain to the king. His mother, Augusta (died 1813), was daughter of Pennell Hawkins, serjeant-surgeon to the king, and niece of Sir Cæsar Hawkins.

George matriculated at Christ Church, Oxford, on 30 October 1784, aged seventeen. Graduating B.A. in 1788, he was elected a Fellow of All Souls College, took holy orders, and proceeded M.A. in 1792 (B.D. in 1802, and D.D. in 1807). In 1801 he was proctor in the university, and in 1802 he preached the Bampton lectures, his subject being ‘Religious Enthusiasm.’ The success of these sermons, published in 1803, brought him to the notice of the king, who appointed him sub-preceptor to Princess Charlotte of Wales.

Much clerical preferment followed. He became prebendary of Colworth, Chichester, in 1802; perpetual curate of Stoke Canon, Devon, in 1807; vicar of Broadwinsor, Dorset, in 1808; fourth prebendary of Winchester in 1810; rector of Harrietsham and Woodchurch (in exchange for Broadwinsor) in 1813, and prebendary of Salisbury in 1814. He spent on restoring the rectory-houses and in building schools in the parishes over which he presided. As prebendary of Winchester, he superintended the repairs of the Winchester Cathedral. On 6 January 1817, while engaged on this work, he fell a distance of thirty feet, and sustained severe injuries to the head, from which he never wholly recovered.

Subsequently, he spent much time in Italy, and at Rome purchased many pictures by contemporary artists. He wrote Italian with ease and accuracy. In 1825 he succeeded to the property of his uncle John. He died at his house in the Close at Winchester on 25 October 1841. The sale of his library, consisting of 12,500 volumes and many prints and pictures, took place at Winchester, and lasted thirteen days (11–25 January 1842). Nott's coins, gems, and bronzes were then sold in April in London.

== Works ==
Nott, like his uncle, devoted much time to the study of sixteenth-century literature, and produced an exhaustive edition of the ‘Works of Henry Howard, earl of Surrey, and of Sir Thomas Wyatt the elder’ (1815–16, in two large 4to vols.) While working on what he intended as a new edition of Tottels Miscellany, Nott discovered Wyatt's own album of poems, partly autograph, the Egerton Manuscript, and also the Arundel-Harington Manuscript, an intermediate source of Tottels, in the library of John Harington, and also the Devonshire Manuscript, a manuscript anthology by many hands contemporary with the poet, a source for 16 more poems by Wyatt (as well as numerous misattributions by modern editors). Nott was the first editor of Wyatt's poems from manuscript (as contrasted with the defective texts in Tottels) and of Surrey's, which he found in the Arundel-Harington Manuscript. Highly skilled as a textual editor due to his training in classical philology, Nott did an excellent job of producing the editiones principes of these two authors. Later editors have improved their texts in minor respects, but modern editors (notably Muir and Rebholz) have badly marred their editions of Wyatt by including over 100 poems which are not Wyatt's. Nott's edition is still an important source for the texts of both poets. His biographies of Henry Howard, Earl of Surrey and his son Henry Howard, 1st Earl of Northampton supply recondite information. Nott unwarrantably assumed that nearly all Surrey's poems were addressed to the Lady Geraldine (Elizabeth Grey, Countess of Kildare), and gave each a fanciful title based on that assumption.

Besides the Bampton lectures and an occasional sermon, Nott also published some translations into Italian, and edited some Italian books. His Italian version of the English Book of Common Prayer (‘Libro delle Preghiere Communi’) appeared in 1831. In 1832 he printed at Florence for the first time, with Italian introduction and notes, ‘Fortunatus Siculus ossia l'Avventuroso Ciciliano di Busone da Gubbio: romanzo storico scritto nel MCCCXI.’
