= United States v. Jones (2012) =

United States v. Antoine Jones
- Supreme Court of the United States

Argued November 8, 2011 Decided January 23, 2012
- Full case name: United States v. Antoine Jones
- Docket no.: 10-1259
- Citations: 565 U.S. 400 (more) 132 S. Ct. 945; 181 L. Ed. 2d 911; 2012 U.S. LEXIS 1063; 80 U.S.L.W. 4125
- Argument: Oral argument

Case history
- Prior: Motion to suppress evidence denied, 451 F. Supp. 2d 71 (D.D.C. 2012); motion for reconsideration denied, 511 F. Supp. 2d 74 (D.D.C. 2007); reversed sub nom. United States v. Maynard, 615 F.3d 544 (D.C. Cir. 2010); rehearing en banc denied, 625 F.3d 766 (2010); certiorari granted, 564 U.S. 1036 (2011).

Holding
- The attachment of the GPS device to a vehicle by the police, and its use to monitor the vehicle's movements, constitutes a search under the Fourth Amendment and requires a warrant.

Court membership
- Chief Justice John Roberts Associate Justices Antonin Scalia · Anthony Kennedy; Clarence Thomas · Ruth Bader Ginsburg; Stephen Breyer · Samuel Alito; Sonia Sotomayor · Elena Kagan

Case opinions
- Majority: Scalia, joined by Roberts, Kennedy, Thomas, Sotomayor
- Concurrence: Sotomayor
- Concurrence: Alito (in judgment), joined by Ginsburg, Breyer, Kagan

Laws applied
- U.S. Const. amend. IV

United States v. Jones, 565 U.S. 400 (2012), is a landmark United States Supreme Court case in which the court held that installing a Global Positioning System (GPS) tracking device on a vehicle and using the device to monitor the vehicle's movements constitutes a search under the Fourth Amendment.

In 2004, Antoine Jones was suspected by police in the District of Columbia of drug trafficking. Investigators requested and received a warrant to attach a GPS tracking device to the underside of Jones's car but then exceeded the warrant's scope in both geography and length of time. The Supreme Court ruled unanimously that this was a search under the Fourth Amendment, although they were split 5–4 as to the fundamental reasons behind that conclusion. The majority held that by physically installing the GPS device on Jones's car, the police had committed a trespass against his "personal effects." This trespass, in an attempt to obtain information, constituted a search per se.

== Background ==
=== Police investigation and criminal trial ===
Antoine Jones owned a nightclub in the District of Columbia; Lawrence Maynard managed the club. In 2004, a joint Federal Bureau of Investigation (FBI) and Metropolitan Police Department task force began investigating Jones and Maynard for narcotics violations. During the course of the investigation, police installed a Global Positioning System (GPS) device on Jones's wife's Jeep Grand Cherokee. They had received a valid warrant from a judge, but that warrant only covered the District of Columbia and only for a limited time period. The GPS device tracked the vehicle's movements 24 hours a day for four weeks, and in the states surrounding the District of Columbia. This exceeded both the time limit and the geographic reach of the original warrant. The FBI arrested Jones in late 2005 and charged him with conspiracy to distribute narcotics, based on data about the locations to which the vehicle was tracked, and he filed a motion to exclude the GPS data from the evidence collected against him.

Jones was tried in criminal court in late 2006, and a federal jury deadlocked on the conspiracy charge and acquitted him of multiple other counts. Prosecutors retried Jones for charges that had not been considered in the first trial, and in early 2008 the jury returned a guilty verdict on one count of conspiracy to distribute and to possess, with intent to distribute, five or more kilograms of cocaine and fifty or more grams of cocaine base. He was sentenced to life in prison.

=== Appeal of criminal convinction ===
Jones argued that his criminal conviction should be overturned because the use of the GPS tracker violated the Fourth Amendment's protection against unreasonable search and seizure. In 2010, the United States Court of Appeals for the District of Columbia Circuit agreed with Jones and overturned his conviction, holding that the police action was a search because it violated Jones's reasonable expectation of privacy. The D.C. Circuit then denied prosecutors' petition for rehearing en banc.

The Circuit Court's decision was the subject of significant legal debate on GPS tracking by police, which was unsettled in the law at that time. In United States v. Garcia (2007), Judge Richard Posner of the United States Court of Appeals for the Seventh Circuit had reached the opposite conclusion on whether GPS tracking by police was a search under the Fourth Amendment.

Federal prosecutors appealed the D.C. Circuit decision in favor of Jones. In June 2011, the Supreme Court granted certiorari to resolve two questions. The first question was "Whether the warrantless use of a tracking device on respondent's vehicle to monitor its movements on public streets violated the Fourth Amendment." The second question was "Whether the government violated respondent's Fourth Amendment rights by installing the GPS tracking device on his vehicle without a valid warrant and without his consent."

== Oral argument ==
At the Supreme Court, Deputy Solicitor General Michael Dreeben began his argument on behalf of federal prosecutors by noting that information that is visible to anyone in the public, such as a driver's movements on public roads, is not protected by the Fourth Amendment. Dreeben cited United States v. Knotts (1983) as an example in which police were allowed to use a device known as a "beeper" that enabled tracking a car from a short distance away. Chief Justice John Roberts distinguished the present case from Knotts, saying that using a beeper still took "a lot of work" whereas a GPS device allows the police to "sit back in the station ... and push a button whenever they want to find out where the car is."

Justice Antonin Scalia then directed the discussion to whether installing the device was an unreasonable search. Scalia argued that "when that device is installed against the will of the owner of the car on the car, that is unquestionably a trespass and thereby rendering the owner of the car not secure in his effects... against an unreasonable search and seizure." Dreeben argued that it may have been a trespass by police, but in the 1984 precedent United States v. Karo (a case involving a similar trespass) the Supreme Court ruled that it "made no difference because the purpose of the Fourth Amendment is to protect privacy interests and meaningful interference [with possessions], not to cover all technical trespasses."

Justice Samuel Alito stated that people's use of technology is changing what the expectation of privacy is for the courts. "You know, I don't know what society expects and I think it's changing. Technology is changing people's expectations of privacy. Suppose we look forward 10 years, and maybe 10 years from now 90 percent of the population will be using social networking sites and they will have on average 500 friends and they will have allowed their friends to monitor their location 24 hours a day, 365 days a year, through the use of their cell phones. Then — what would the expectation of privacy be then?"

Justice Sonia Sotomayor noted that "What motivated the Fourth Amendment historically was the disapproval, the outrage, that our Founding Fathers experienced with general warrants that permitted police indiscriminately to investigate just on the basis of suspicion, not probable cause, and to invade every possession that the individual had in search of a crime." She then asked, "How is this different?"

== Opinion of the court ==
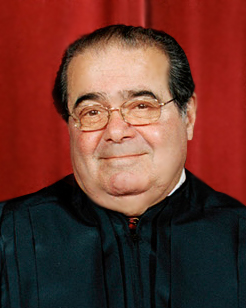
Justice Antonin Scalia delivered the opinion of the 5–4 majority.

On January 23, 2012, the Supreme Court held that the government's installation of a GPS device on a target's vehicle, and its use of that device to monitor the vehicle's movements, constitutes a "search" under the Fourth Amendment. Some journalists and commentators interpreted this ruling as a requirement that all GPS data surveillance requires a search warrant, but this ruling was narrower and applied only to the circumstances of the police investigation of Jones, particularly regarding location data when driving a vehicle.

It can be said that all nine justices unanimously considered the police's actions in Jones to be unconstitutional. Importantly, however, they were split 5–4 on the reasoning for that conclusion. Furthermore, the justices were of three different opinions with respect to the breadth of the judgment.

=== Majority opinion ===
Justice Antonin Scalia authored the majority opinion. He cited a line of cases dating as far back as 1886 to argue that a physical intrusion, or trespass, into a constitutionally-protected area—in an attempt to find something or to obtain information—was the basis, historically, for determining whether a "search" had occurred under the meaning of the Fourth Amendment. Scalia conceded that in the years following Katz v. United States (1967)—in which electronic eavesdropping on a public telephone booth was held to be a search—the vast majority of search and seizure case law had shifted away from that approach founded on property rights, and towards an approach based on a person's expectation of privacy. However, he cited a number of post-Katz cases including Alderman v. United States and Soldal v. Cook County to argue that the trespass analysis had not been abandoned by the court. In response to criticisms within Alito's concurrence, Scalia emphasized that the Fourth Amendment must provide, at a minimum, the same level of protection as it did when it was adopted. Furthermore, a trespassory test need not exclude a test of the expectation of privacy, which may be appropriate to consider in situations where there was no governmental trespass.

In the present case, the court concluded that government's installation of a GPS device onto the defendant's car (his "personal effects" per Fourth Amendment terminology) was a trespass that was purposed to obtain information, so it was a search under the Fourth Amendment. Having reached the conclusion that this was a search under the Fourth Amendment, the court declined to examine whether any exception exists that would render the search "reasonable," because the government had failed to advance that theory in the lower courts.

Also left unanswered was the broader question surrounding the privacy implications of a warrantless use of GPS data without a physical intrusion—as might occur, for example, with the electronic collection of GPS data from wireless service providers or factory-installed vehicle tracking and navigation services. The court left these matters to be decided in some future case, saying, "It may be that achieving the same result through electronic means, without an accompanying trespass, is an unconstitutional invasion of privacy, but the present case does not require us to answer that question."

=== Sotomayor's concurring opinion ===
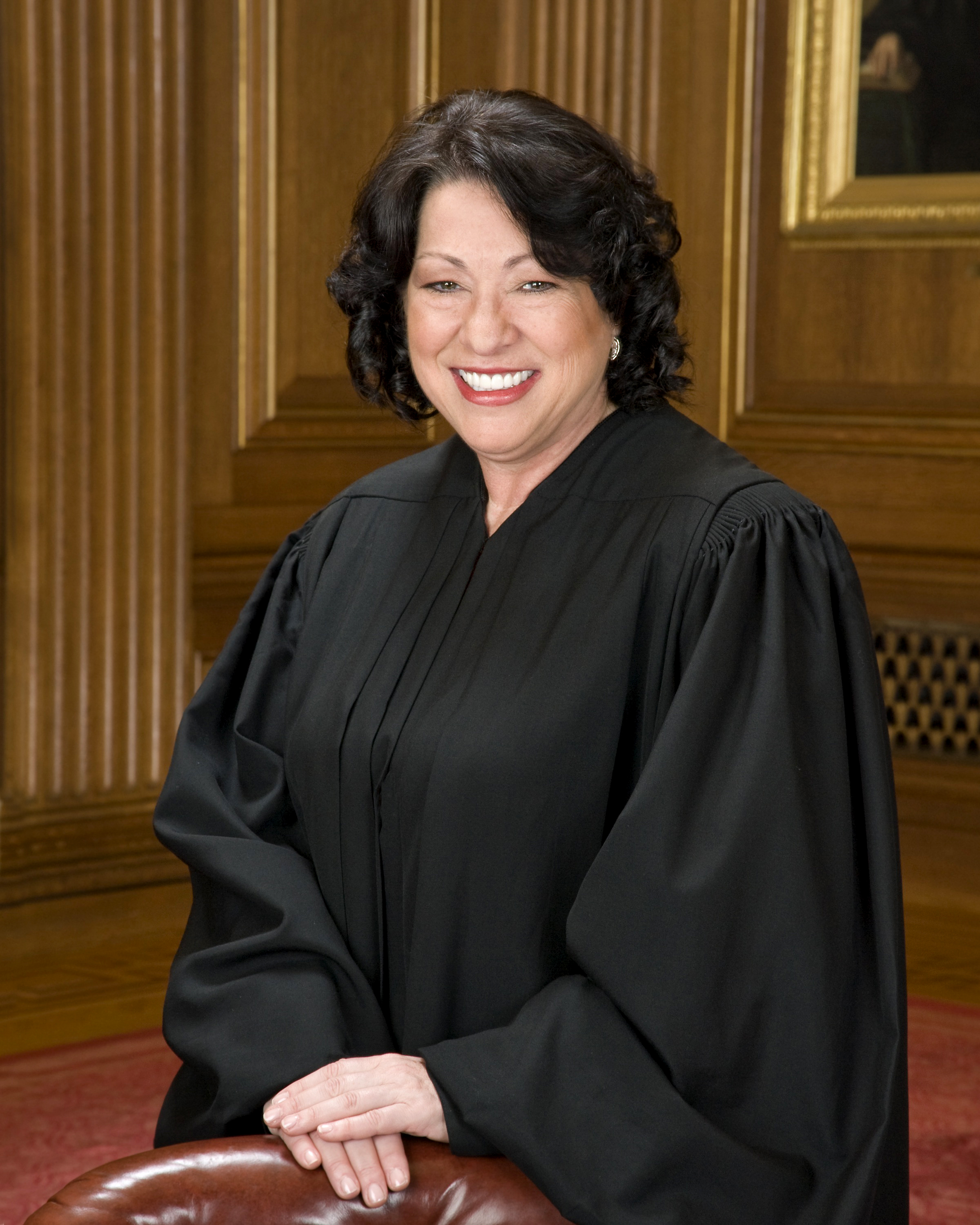
Justice Sonia Sotomayor was the sole voice against warrantless GPS surveillance, whether long- or short-term, both on the basis of property and privacy rights.

Justice Sonia Sotomayor was the fifth justice to join Scalia's opinion, making hers the decisive vote; she also wrote a separate concurring opinion. "As the majority's opinion makes clear," she noted, "Katz's reasonable-expectation-of-privacy test augmented, but did not displace or diminish, the common-law trespassory test that preceded it". She agreed with Justice Samuel Alito's expectation of privacy reasoning with respect to long-term surveillance (see below), but she went a step further by also disputing the constitutionality of warrantless short-term GPS surveillance. Even during short-term monitoring, she reasoned, GPS surveillance can precisely record an individual's every movement, and hence can reveal completely private destinations, like "trips to the psychiatrist, the plastic surgeon, the abortion clinic, the AIDS treatment center, the strip club, the criminal defense attorney, the by-the-hour motel, the union meeting, the mosque, synagogue or church, the gay bar and on and on". Sotomayor added:

People disclose the phone numbers that they dial or text to their cellular providers, the URLs that they visit and the e-mail addresses with which they correspond to their Internet service providers, and the books, groceries and medications they purchase to online retailers. [...] I would not assume that all information voluntarily disclosed to some member of the public for a limited purpose is, for that reason alone, disentitled to Fourth Amendment protection.

Sotomayor distinguished the present case from Knotts, reminding that Knotts suggested that a different principle might apply to situations in which every a person's movement was completely monitored for 24 hours.

=== Alito's concurring opinion ===
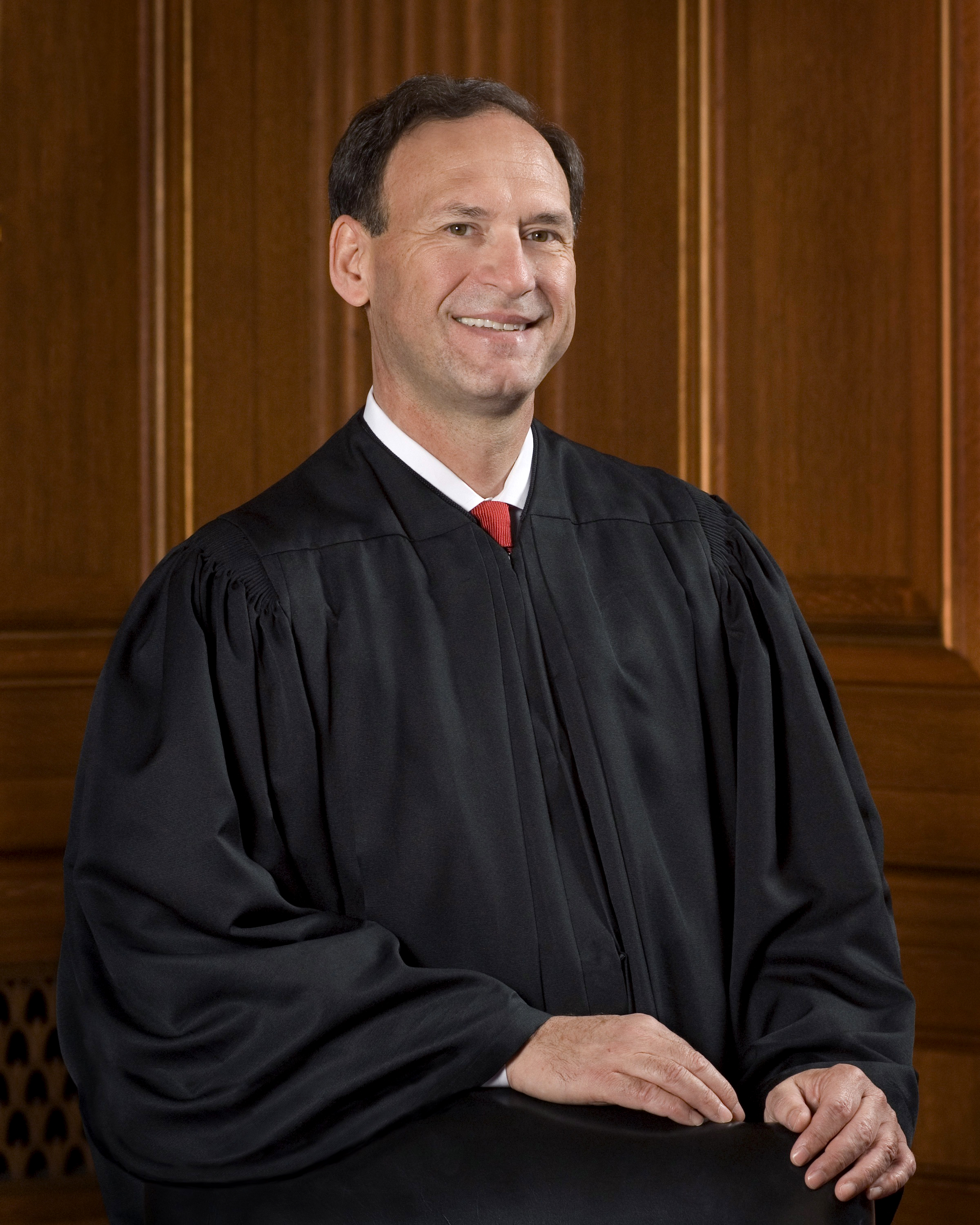
Justice Samuel Alito and three others concurred, but only on the basis of privacy rights, and only against long-term GPS surveillance.

In his own concurring opinion, Justice Samuel Alito wrote with respect to privacy: "short-term monitoring of a person's movements on public streets accords with expectations of privacy" but "the use of longer term GPS monitoring in investigations of most offenses impinges on expectations of privacy". Alito argued against the majority's reliance on trespass under modern circumstances. Specifically, he argued that the common law property-based analysis of a "search" under the Fourth Amendment did not apply to such electronic situations as the one that occurred in this case. He further argued that following the doctrinal changes in Katz, a technical trespass leading to the gathering of evidence was "neither necessary nor sufficient to establish a constitutional violation." Following the privacy-based approach most commonly used post-Katz, the other four justices were instead of the opinion that the continuous monitoring of every single movement of an individual's car for 28 days violated a reasonable expectation of privacy, and thus constituted a search. Alito explained that before GPS and similar electronic technology, month-long surveillance of an individual's every move would have been exceptionally demanding and costly, requiring a tremendous amount of resources and people. As a result, society's expectations were, and still are, that such complete and long-term surveillance would not be undertaken, and that an individual would not think it could occur to him or her.

With regard to continuous monitoring for a short period, the other Justices relied on the Knotts precedent and declined to find a violation of the expectation of privacy. In Knotts, a short-distance signal beeper in the defendant's car was tracked during a single trip for less than a day. The Knotts court held that a person traveling on public roads has no expectation of privacy in his movements, because the vehicle's starting point, direction, stops, or final destination could be seen by anyone else on the road.

== Impact and subsequent developments ==
Walter E. Dellinger III, a former U.S. solicitor general and the attorney who represented Jones, said the decision was "a signal event in Fourth Amendment history." He also said the decision made it more risky for law enforcement to use a GPS tracking device without a warrant. FBI director Robert Mueller testified in 2013 that the Jones decision had limited the bureau's surveillance capabilities.

Criminal defense attorneys and civil libertarians such as Virginia Sloan of the Constitution Project praised the ruling for protecting Fourth Amendment rights against government intrusion through modern technology. The Electronic Frontier Foundation, which filed an amicus brief arguing that warrantless GPS tracking violates reasonable expectations of privacy, praised Sotomayor's concurrence for raising concerns that existing Fourth Amendment precedents do not reflect the realities of modern technology.

The Supreme Court remanded the case to the district court to determine whether Jones's criminal conviction could be restored based on the other evidence collected, and without the GPS data ruled unconstitutional by the Supreme Court. During the original investigation, the police obtained cell site location data via a process enabled by the Stored Communications Act. Judge Ellen Segal Huvelle ruled in late 2012 that the government could use the cell site data against Jones. A new criminal trial began in early 2013 after Jones rejected a plea bargain of fifteen to twenty-two years in prison. In March 2013, a mistrial was declared with the jury evenly split. The government planned for a fourth trial, but in May 2013 Jones accepted a plea bargain of fifteen years with credit for time served.

In October 2013, the Court of Appeals for the Third Circuit addressed the unanswered question of whether warrantless use of GPS devices would be reasonable—and thus lawful—under the Fourth Amendment if police have probable cause to justify the search. United States v. Katzin was the first relevant appeals court ruling in the wake of Jones to address this topic. The court held that a warrant was indeed required to deploy GPS tracking devices, and further, that none of the narrow exceptions to the Fourth Amendment's warrant requirement (e.g., exigent circumstances) were applicable.
