= Notts =

Notts may refer to:

- Nottinghamshire
- Notts County FC, an association football club

== See also ==
- Nott (disambiguation)
