= Rosette (music) =

A rosette (from French, meaning little rose), rose, or knot, in the context of musical instruments, is a form of soundhole decoration. The name originated during the medieval period, as a comparison with church windows which were called rose windows. On the oud they are called by the Arabic language term shams, meaning sun.

== History ==
From the medieval to the baroque periods, it was common to have ornately carved soundhole designs, called roses. These were either carved directly into the wood of the soundboard or inserted from behind and made of carved wood or parchment. The designs used for lutes and other early instruments were often inspired by the geometric patterns in Islamic art, probably from those used on the oud. During the medieval period, most such designs were 4-sided, whereas during the renaissance and baroque periods, 6-sided designs were used.

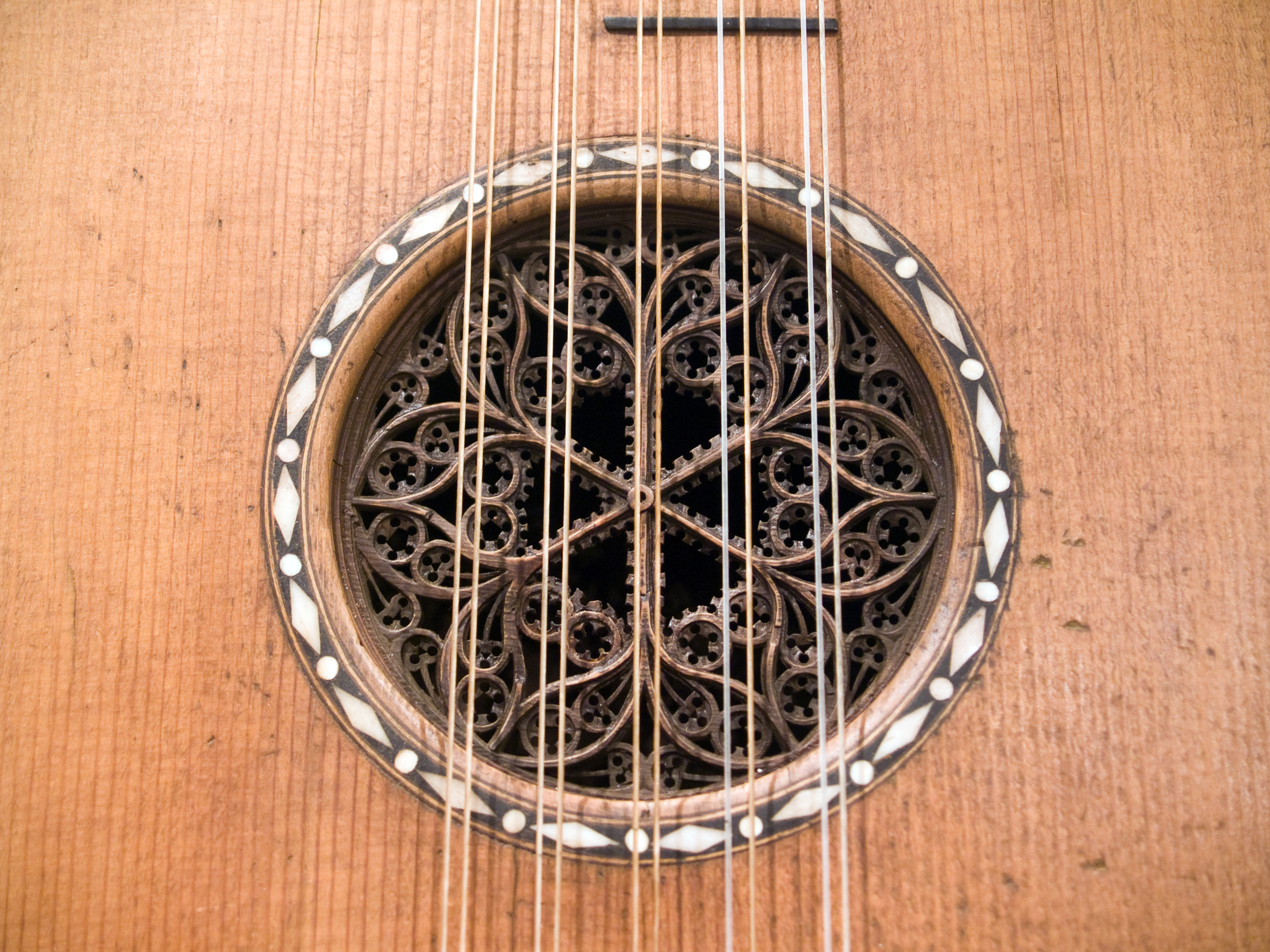
Baroque guitar soundhole with inserted wooden rose and inlaid rosette (1700).

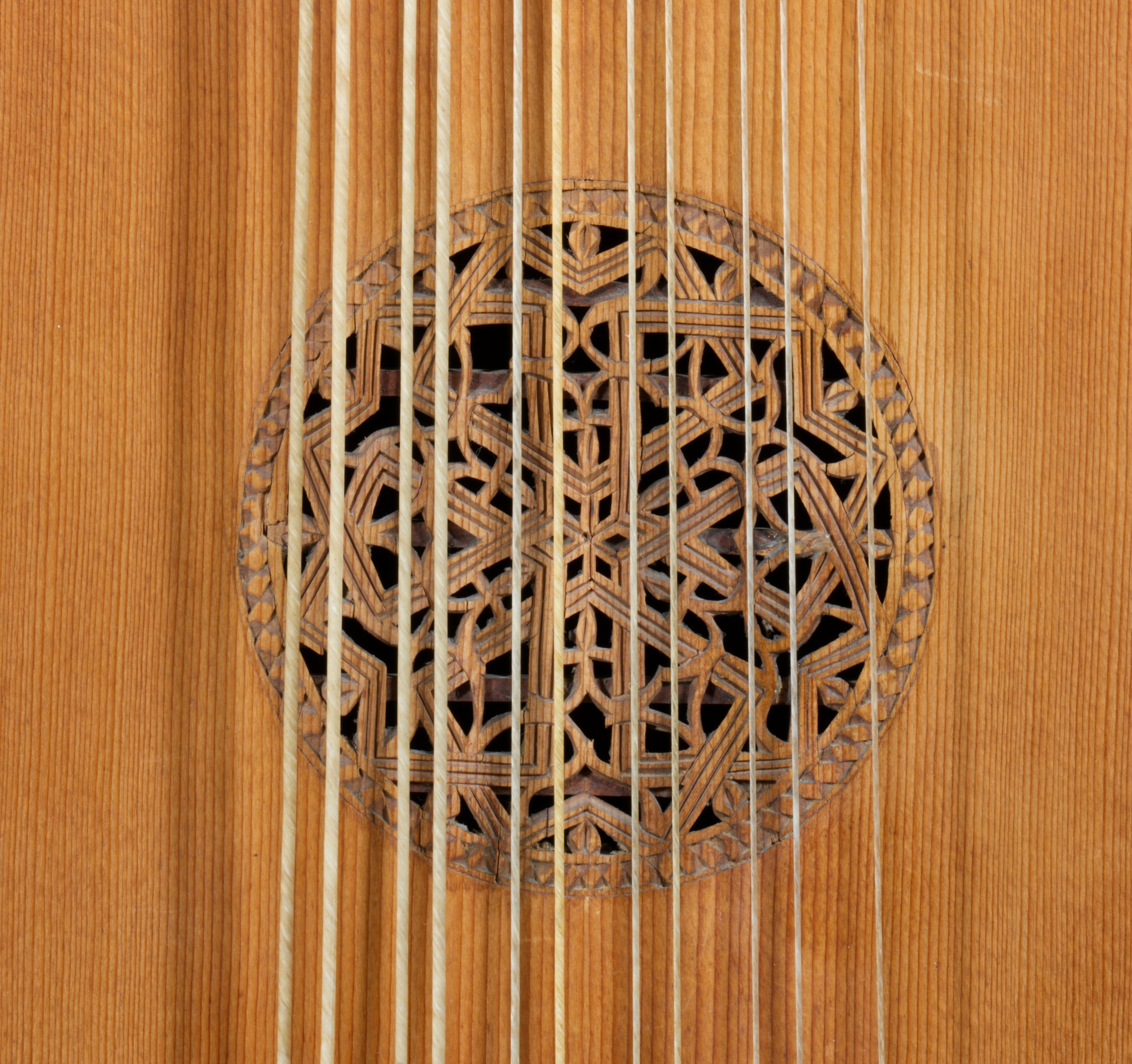
A carved rose on a mandora from 1726.

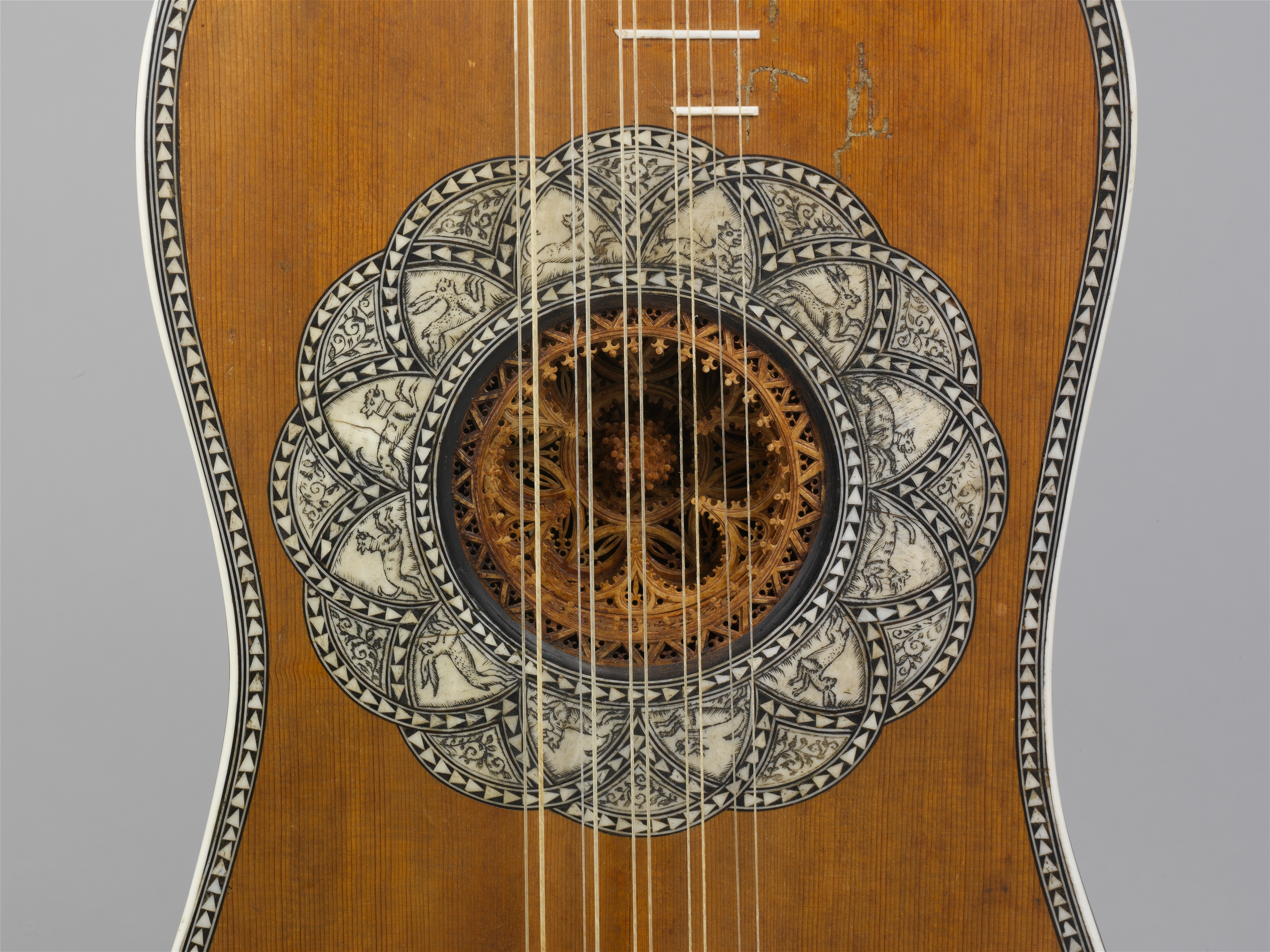
Baroque guitar soundhole with multi-layered parchment rose from behind, surrounded by inlaid rosette (1630).

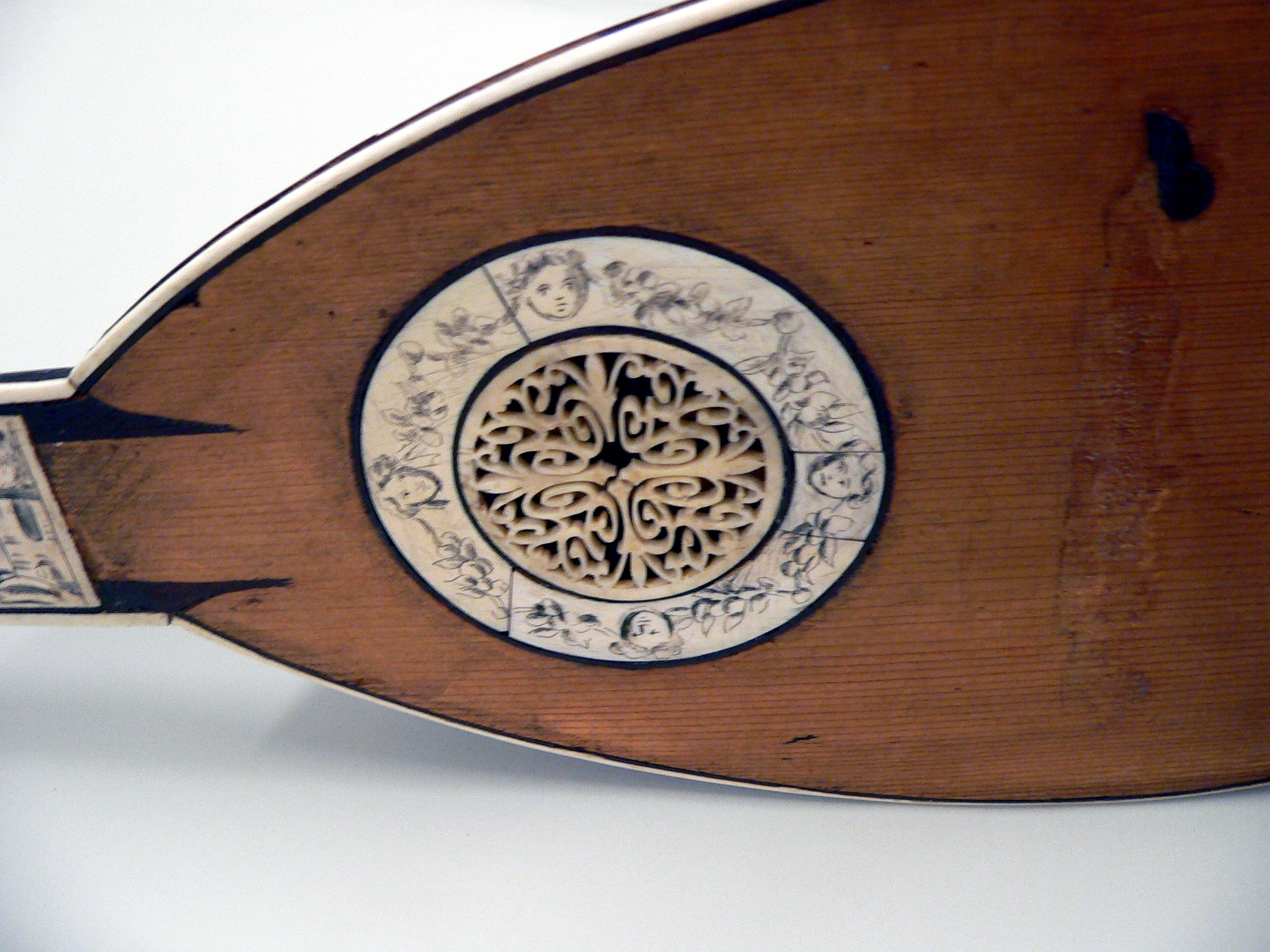
Baroque mandolin with inserted rose made from ivory.

== Modern usage ==
During the romantic and classical periods in western music, the carved ornate soundhole roses went out of fashion and were replaced by open soundholes surrounded by inlaid decoration, commonly called rosettes. This style is still used today on classical and acoustic guitars. Modern rosettes can be made of wood or plastic. Roses inserted from behind are still used on Ouds, Lavtas, Laoutos and other modern lutes. Decorative inserted roses are also sometimes used in modern times on electro-acoustic instruments, to prevent feedback.

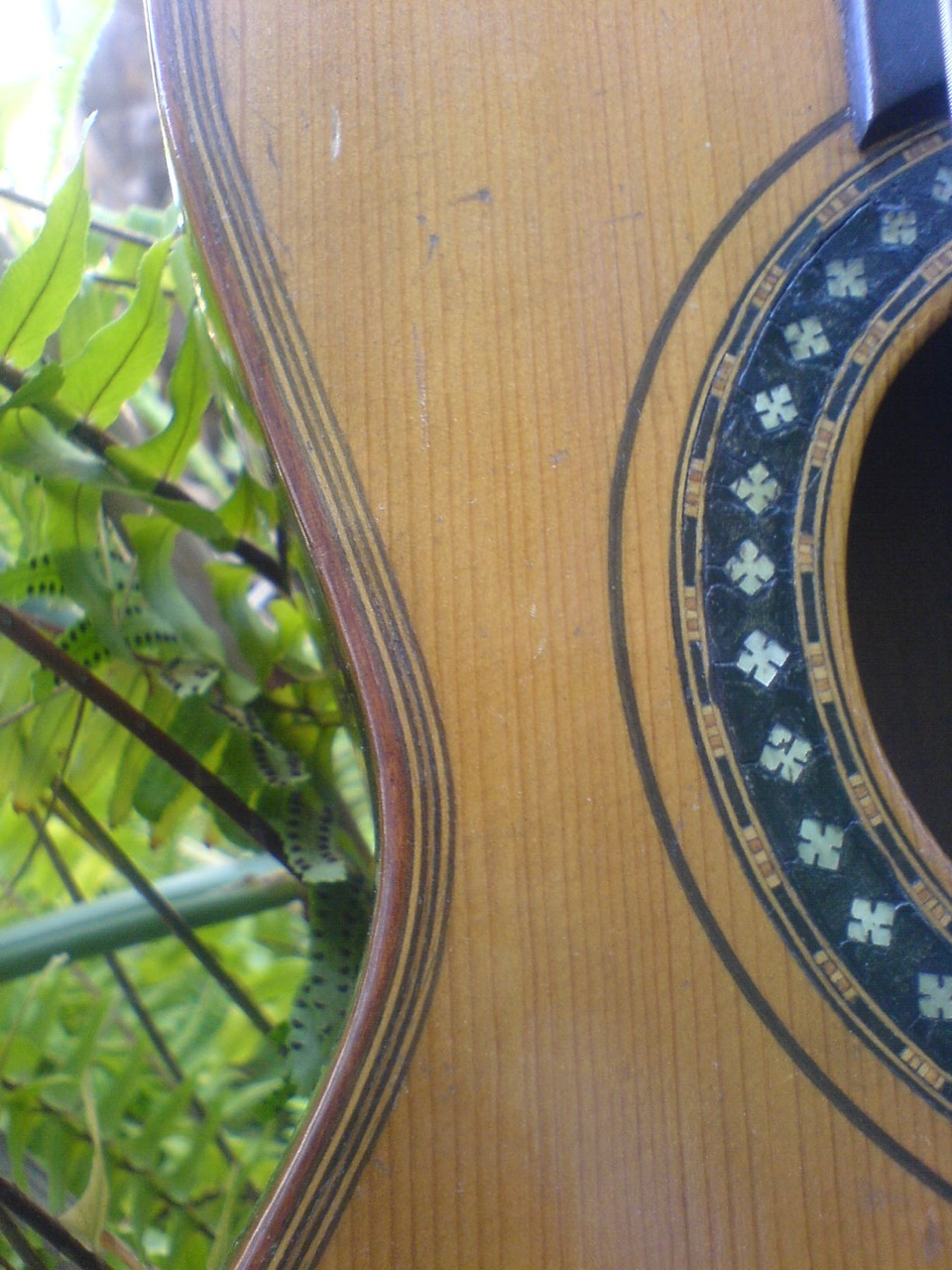
Rosette on Romantic guitar (1890s).

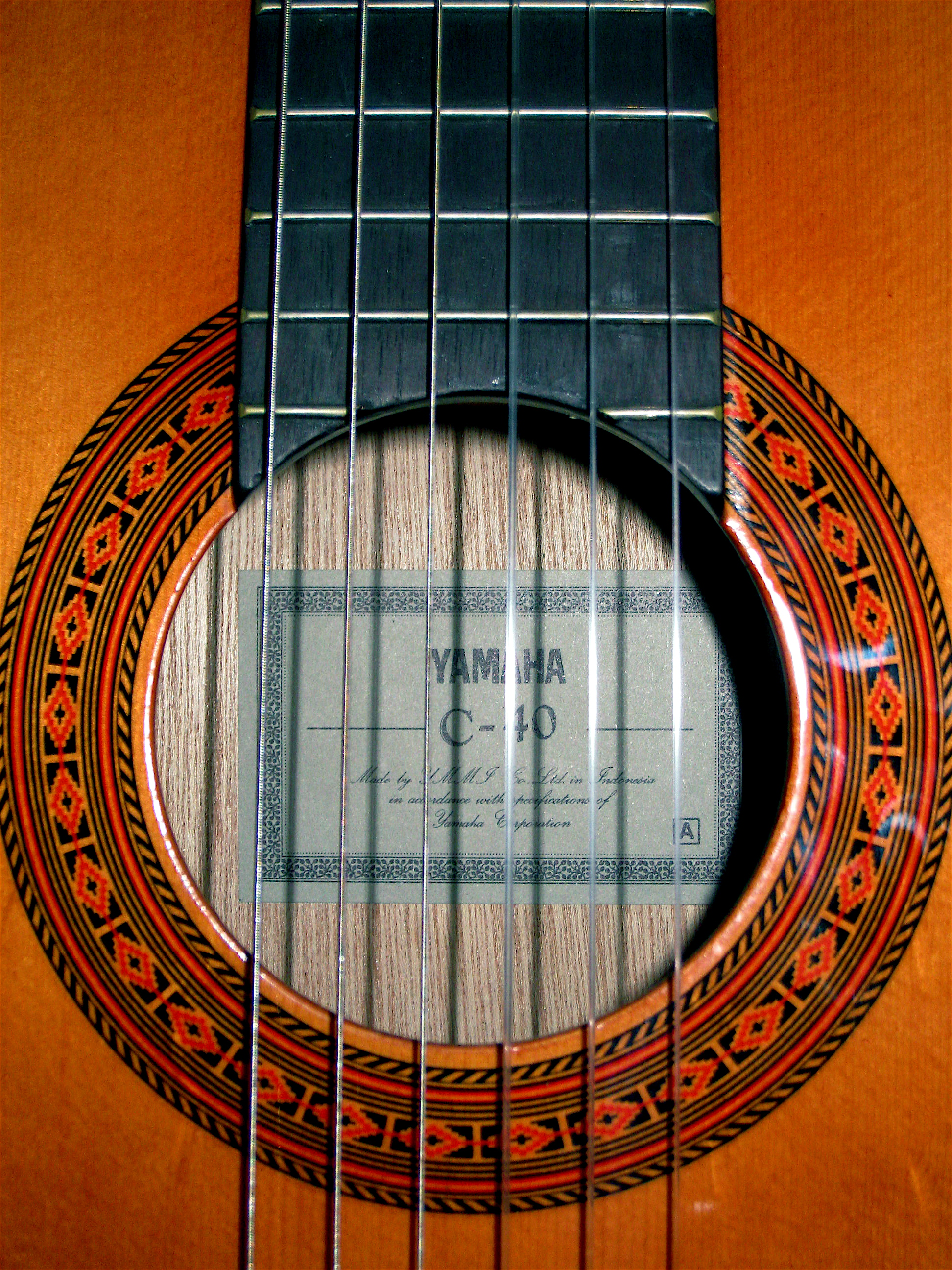
close-up view of rosette on modern classical guitar.

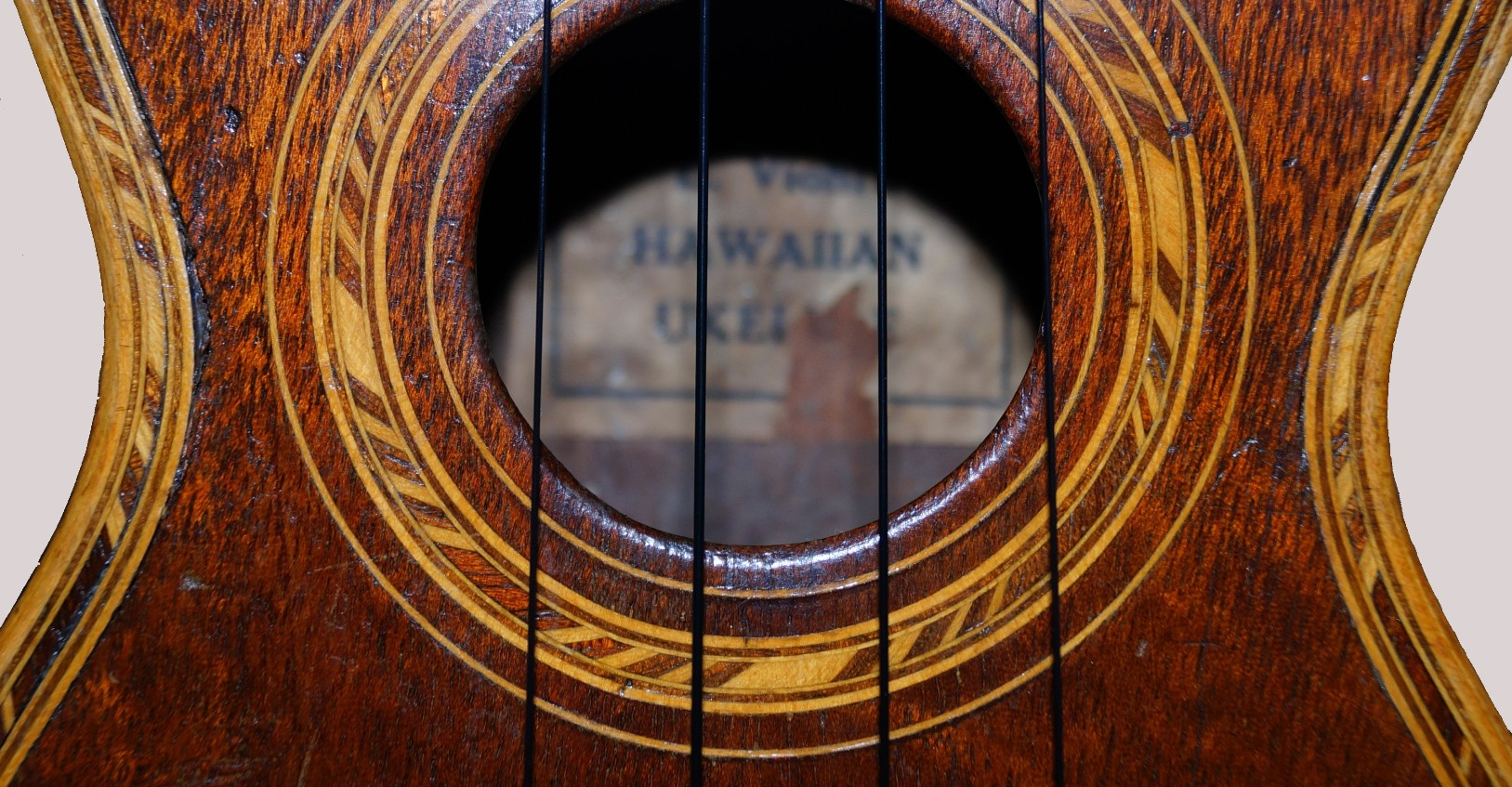
Ukulele soundhole rosette

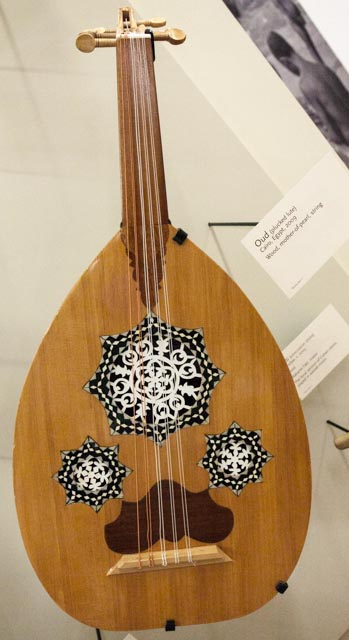
Egyptian oud with common triple soundhole shams (rose) design.

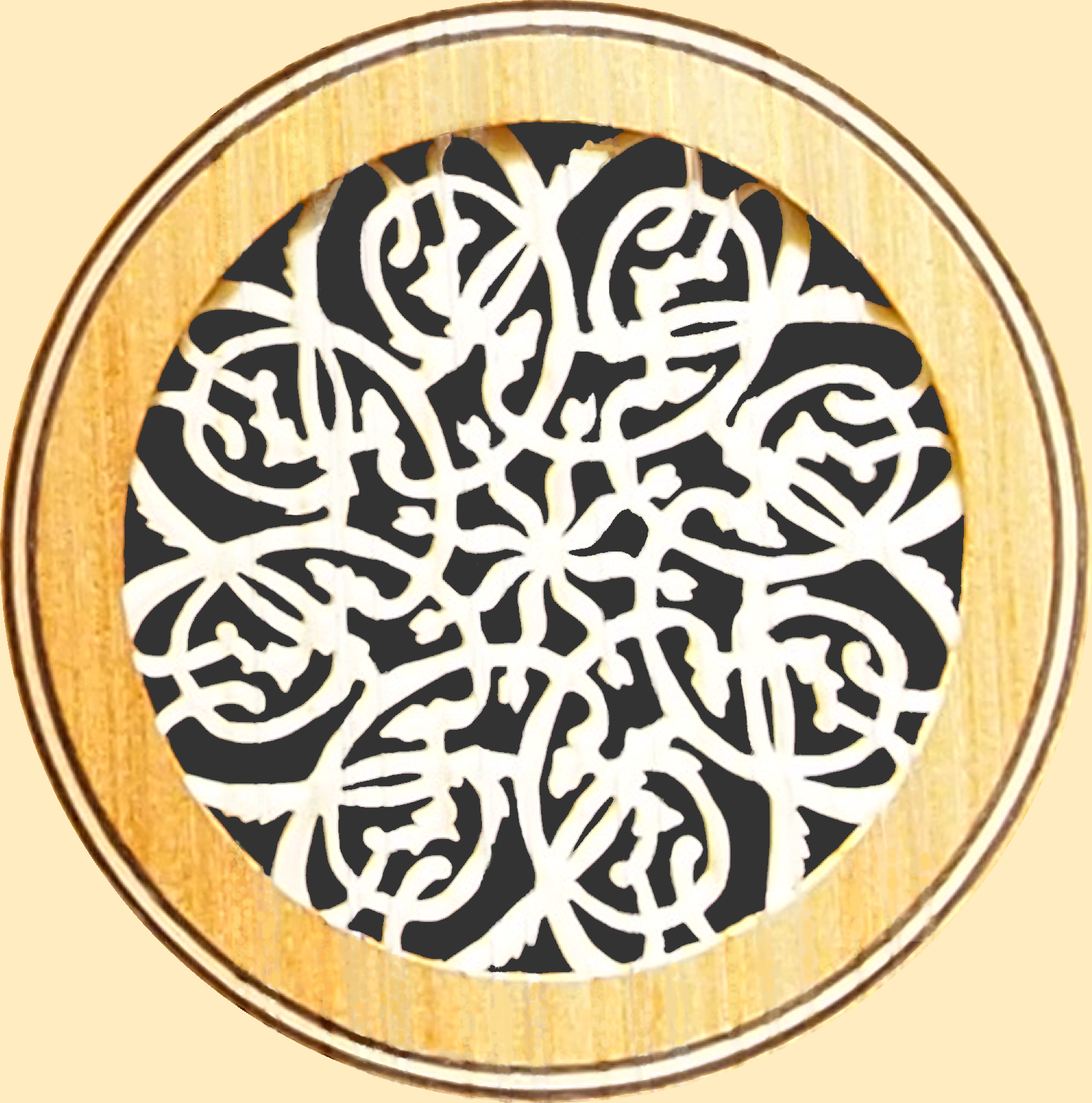
Close-up of oud shams

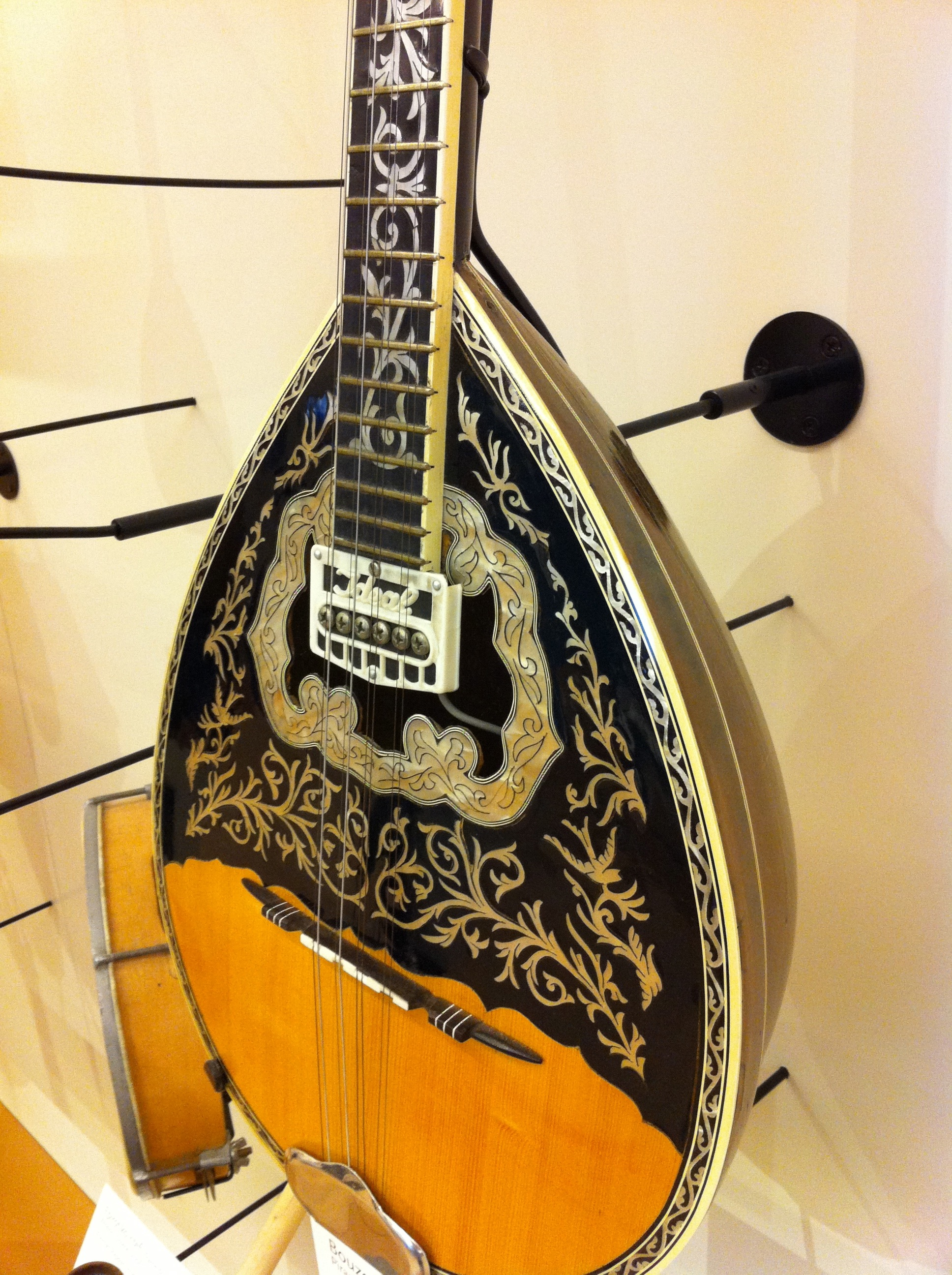
Modern bouzouki with inlaid rosette and scratch plate.
