= Knotts =

Knotts is a surname. Notable people with the surname include:

- Armanis F. Knotts (c. 1860–1937), American politician and lawyer
- Don Knotts (1924–2006), American comedic actor
- Gary Knotts (born 1977), American baseball player
- Howard Knotts, American flying ace during World War I
- Jake Knotts (born 1944), American politician
- Ricky Knotts (1951–1980), American ASA and NASCAR driver

== See also ==
- United States v. Knotts, a 1983 United States Supreme Court case
- Knott's (disambiguation)
- Knott (disambiguation)
