= Charles Cooper Nott =

Charles Cooper Nott may refer to:

- Charles C. Nott Sr. (1827–1916), Chief Justice of the United States Court of Claims
- Charles Cooper Nott Jr. (1869–1957), Assistant District Attorney and Judge of the New York General Sessions Court
