= Sidney Knott =

South African cricketer (1933–2020)

Personal information
- Born: 12 August 1933; Alice, Cape Province, South Africa
- Died: 8 December 2020 (aged 87); East London, Eastern Cape, South Africa
- Batting: Right-handed
- Bowling: Right-arm fast
- Relatives: Donald Knott (son)

Domestic team information
- Years: Team
- 1951–52 to 1964–65: Border

Career statistics
Competition	First-class
Matches	49
Runs scored	1222
Batting average	14.37
100s/50s	0/6
Top score	79
Balls bowled	10,616
Wickets	194
Bowling average	21.59
5 wickets in innings	11
10 wickets in match	1
Best bowling	7/34
Catches/stumpings	19/0
- Source: Cricinfo, 5 December 2017

Sidney Knott (12 August 1933 – 8 December 2020) was a South African cricketer who played first-class cricket for Border from 1951 to 1964.

A fast bowler, Sidney Knott was a fixture in the Border team for ten years after making his first-class debut in the 1951–52 season at the age of 18. He had his most successful season in 1952–53, when he took 36 wickets in six matches at an average of 17.19. He also took his best innings figures in that season, 7 for 34 against North Eastern Transvaal, and his best match figures, 4 for 54 and 6 for 50 against Griqualand West.

Against Natal in East London in 1959–60 he took 5 for 40, bowling unchanged through the innings, to help dismiss Natal for 90 on the first day. Border, however, were then dismissed for totals of 16 and 18, Knott being one of the three batsmen who made a pair.
