= United States v. Karo =

- Supreme Court of the United States

Argued April 25, 1984 Decided July 3, 1984
- Full case name: United States v. Karo, et al.
- Citations: 468 U.S. 705 (more) 104 S. Ct. 3296; 82 L. Ed. 2d 530; 1984 U.S. LEXIS 148; 52 U.S.L.W. 5102

Case history
- Prior: 710 F.2d 1433 (10th Cir. 1983); cert. granted, 464 U.S. 1068 (1984).
- Subsequent: Rehearing denied, 468 U.S. 1250 (1984)

Holding
- The use of an electronic beeper device to monitor a can of ether without a warrant constituted unlawful search and seizure.

Court membership
- Chief Justice Warren E. Burger Associate Justices William J. Brennan Jr. · Byron White; Thurgood Marshall · Harry Blackmun; Lewis F. Powell Jr. · William Rehnquist; John P. Stevens · Sandra Day O'Connor

Case opinions
- Majority: White, joined by Burger, Blackmun, Powell, Rehnquist, O'Connor (parts Parts I, II, IV)
- Majority: White, joined by Burger, Brennan, Marshall, Blackmun, Powell, Stevens (Part III)
- Concurrence: O'Connor (in part and in judgment), joined by Rehnquist
- Concur/dissent: Stevens, joined by Brennan, Marshall

Laws applied
- U.S. Const. amend. IV

United States v. Karo, 468 U.S. 705 (1984), was a United States Supreme Court decision related to the Fourth Amendment protection from unreasonable search and seizure. It held that use of an electronic beeper device to monitor a can of ether without a warrant constituted an unlawful search. However, the Court upheld the conviction of Karo and his accomplices, stating that the warrant affidavit contained enough information not derived from the unlawful use of the beeper to provide sufficient basis for probable cause.

== Background ==
Drug Enforcement Administration agents installed an electronic beeper in a can of ether with the consent of the owner, a government informant. The marked can was sold along with a shipment of 50 gallons of ether to the respondents, who intended to use the ether for the extraction and production of cocaine. Having tracked the can of ether as it was moved between various residences and commercial storage lockers, the federal investigators determined the location of the can and obtained an arrest warrant. Respondent Karo and his accomplices were arrested for possession of cocaine with intent to distribute.

Karo's attorneys petitioned to have various portions of the evidence suppressed because they were the "tainted fruit" of an unlawful search. In United States v. Knotts, the Court held that the monitoring of a beeper did not violate the Fourth Amendment when it revealed no information that could not have been obtained through visual surveillance.

== Opinion of the Court ==
The Supreme Court held that the use of the beeper to conduct surveillance on Karo and his accomplices constituted an unlawful search and seizure in violation of the Fourth Amendment. However, they determined that since the affidavit which led to the issuance of the arrest warrant contained a significant amount of evidence not obtained through use of the beeper (such as the smell of ether emanating from the storage locker and visual tracking of the cans of ether in automobiles), the arrest warrant was valid. Thus, Karo's conviction was upheld.

The majority stated that the installation of the beeper in the can of ether did not constitute "search" or "seizure" by definition. Rather, the Fourth Amendment was not implicated until the beeper was turned on and used to track the ether shipment on private property.

== See also ==
- List of United States Supreme Court cases, volume 468
- Carpenter v. United States, 585 U.S. ____ (2018) – Supreme Court ruling that the Government's acquisition of a weeks worth location from cell-site records is a Fourth Amendment search.
