= Bert Knott =

English footballer

Personal information
- Full name: Herbert Knott
- Date of birth: 5 December 1914
- Place of birth: Goole, England
- Date of death: June 1986 (aged 71)
- Place of death: Spilsby, England
- Position: Inside forward

Senior career*
Years	Team	Apps	(Gls)
–1932	Goole Town		
1932–1936	Arsenal	0	(0)
1932–1933	→ Hampstead (loan)		
1933–1934	→ Golders Green (loan)		
1934–1935	→ Margate (loan)		
1935–1936	→ Margate (loan)		
1936–	Brentford	0	(0)
–1937	Stourbridge		
1937–1938	Walsall	9	(2)
1938–1940	Brierley Hill Alliance		
1940	Reading		
1940–1945	Hull City		
1945–1946	Bradford (Park Avenue)	0	(0)
1946–1947	Hull City	6	(1)
1947	Margate		
1947	Hinckley Athletic		
- * Club domestic league appearances and goals

Herbert Knott (5 December 1914 – June 1986) was an English professional footballer who played in the Football League for Walsall and Hull City as an inside forward.

== Career statistics ==
Appearances and goals by club, season and competition
Club	Season	League			FA Cup		Other		Total	
Club	Season	Division	Apps	Goals	Apps	Goals	Apps	Goals	Apps	Goals
Hampstead (loan)	1932–33	Athenian League	7	6	―		7 (Note: 5 appearances and 6 goals in Amateur FA Senior Cup, 1 appearance in FA Amateur Cup, 1 appearance in Middlesex Senior Charity Cup)	9	14	15
Golders Green (loan)	1933–34	Athenian League	19	26	―		12 (Note: 4 appearances and 4 goals in Middlesex Senior Charity Cup, 4 appearances and 2 goals in Middlesex Senior Cup, 3 appearances in FA Amateur Cup, 1 appearance in London Senior Cup)	9	31	33
Golders Green (loan)	Total		26	32	―		19	18	45	50
Hull City	1946–47	Third Division North	6	1	1	0	―		7	1
Career total			32	33	1	0	19	18	52	51

== Honours ==
Margate

- Kent League First Division: 1946–47
