= United States v. Knotts =

- Supreme Court of the United States

Argued December 6, 1982 Decided March 2, 1983
- Full case name: United States v. Knotts
- Citations: 460 U.S. 276 (more) 103 S. Ct. 1081; 75 L. Ed. 2d 55; 1983 U.S. LEXIS 135

Case history
- Prior: 662 F.2d 515 (8th Cir. 1981); cert. granted, 457 U.S. 1131 (1982)

Holding
- A radio transmitter may be used without a warrant to aid the police in their physical pursuit of a suspect.

Court membership
- Chief Justice Warren E. Burger Associate Justices William J. Brennan Jr. · Byron White; Thurgood Marshall · Harry Blackmun; Lewis F. Powell Jr. · William Rehnquist; John P. Stevens · Sandra Day O'Connor

Case opinions
- Majority: Rehnquist, joined by Burger, White, Powell, O'Connor
- Concurrence: Brennan, joined by Marshall
- Concurrence: Blackmun, joined by Brennan, Marshall, Stevens
- Concurrence: Stevens, joined by Brennan, Marshall

Laws applied
- U.S. Const. amend. IV

United States v. Knotts, 460 U.S. 276 (1983), was a United States Supreme Court case regarding the use of an electronic surveillance device. The defendants argued that the use of this device was a Fourth Amendment violation. The device in question was described as a beeper that could only be tracked from a short distance. During a single trip, officers followed a car containing the beeper, relying on beeper signal to determine the car's final destination. The Court unanimously held that since the use of such a device did not violate a legitimate expectation of privacy there was no search and seizure and thus the use was allowed without a warrant. It reasoned that a person traveling in public has no expectation of privacy in one's movements. Since there was no search and seizure there was not a Fourth Amendment violation.

== Background ==
Minnesota law enforcement agents suspected that one of the defendants was purchasing chloroform for the manufacture of methamphetamine, an illegal drug, and arranged with the manufacturer to have a radio transmitting beeper placed within the drum of chloroform the next time it was purchased. Following the purchase, the drum was placed into a vehicle driven by another defendant. Police followed the defendants' vehicle after the purchase, maintaining visual contact for most of the journey, however they had to use the beeper to find the cabin where the defendants stopped. The cabin was owned by Leroy Carlton Knotts, the respondent in this case. Following visual surveillance of his cabin, the authorities acquired a warrant to search the premises, and used the evidence found therein to convict Knotts.

== Decision ==
The Court ruled that a "person traveling in an automobile on public thoroughfares has no reasonable expectation of privacy in his movements from one place to another.” Such information—the starting point, the stops one made, as well as the final destination—was voluntarily conveyed to anyone. There was no search and seizure and hence no Fourth Amendment violation because this information could be gathered by the public through observation. The police used visual surveillance to gather the majority of this information, just because the final location of the automobile was learned through the use of the beeper and not visually, did not make the surveillance illegal. There was no indication that the beeper was used to gather information from within the private area of Knotts' cabin.

== Recent development ==
Nearly three decades later, the Court decided United States v. Jones (2012), a case concerning the federal government's installation of a Global Positioning System (GPS) tracking device on a suspect's vehicle and its use to continuously monitor that vehicle's location for 28 days. The Court voted 9–0 against the government. The five justice majority opinion was based exclusively on a finding of trespass in the GPS installation. Because of the trespass, it was unnecessary to consider whether there was a violation of an expectation of privacy based on using the GPS for long term, continuous surveillance. However in the two concurring opinions, five of the Court's justices did find that there was a violation of such an expectation. It is likely that in an identical, but with an absence of trespass, case, they would be a majority ruling against the government. This ruling would narrow Knotts' broad rule that one does not have an expectation of privacy when traveling public streets, by excluding long-term surveillance.

== See also ==
- List of United States Supreme Court cases, volume 460
- Olmstead v. United States (1928)
- Kyllo v. United States (2001)
- United States v. Karo (1984)
- Katz v. United States (1967)
- United States v. Garcia (2d Cir. 2007)
- United States v. Pineda-Moreno (9th Cir. 2010)
