= Freddie Knott =

English cricketer

Personal information
- Full name: Frederick Hammett Knott
- Born: 30 October 1891; Tunbridge Wells, Kent
- Died: 10 February 1972 (aged 80); Horsell Birch, Woking, Surrey
- Batting: Right-handed
- Bowling: Right-arm leg-break
- Relatives: John Knott (brother)

Domestic team information
- Years: Team
- 1910–1914: Kent
- 1911–1914: Oxford University

Career statistics
Competition	First-class
Matches	44
Runs scored	1,800
Batting average	25.71
100s/50s	3/8
Top score	116
Balls bowled	120
Wickets	4
Bowling average	25.75
5 wickets in innings	0
10 wickets in match	0
Best bowling	3/65
Catches/stumpings	32/1
- Source: CricInfo, 4 June 2016

Frederick Hammett Knott MC (30 October 1891 – 10 February 1972), known as Freddie Knott, was an English amateur cricketer. Knott played for Oxford University Cricket Club and Kent County Cricket Club in the years before the First World War. He played occasionally after the war, including once for Sussex in 1926.

Knott was considered one of cricket's brightest schoolboy talents at Tonbridge School but had a more disappointing time at Oxford. He also played varsity rugby union and was a fine all-round sportsman, later becoming a scratch golfer. He served in the British Army in both World Wars and won the Military Cross after being wounded in Macedonia in 1917.

== Early life ==
Knott was born in Tunbridge Wells, the eldest child of the Reverend Frederick George Knott and his wife Alice. His father was the first Headmaster at Skinners' School in the town. Knott attended Tonbridge School between 1905 and 1910 where he played cricket, captaining the school team in his final year, as well as rugby union and racquets and represented the school in gymnastics. He was a number of school exhibition scholarships and went up to Brasenose College, Oxford in 1910.

Knott was described by Wisden as a "wonderful cricketer" whilst a schoolboy. He was considered a considerable talent with Charles Toppin writing that "seldom, if ever, have the doings of a school boy caused so much interest in the cricket world". He scored over 1,000 runs in school cricket in 1910, making six centuries and averaging over 80 runs per innings and scored 155 for a Public Schools XI against MCC in under two and a half hours at Lord's. His "watchfulness and strength of his back play" were considered his greatest strengths as a batsman at school, although Toppin considered that he had "most of the known strokes at his command".

== Pre-war sporting career ==
Knott made his first-class cricket debut for Kent County Cricket Club in early August 1910, a week after playing for the Public Schools XI. Kent had a very strong batting lineup and won the County Championship in 1910. In his "trial" Knott played well and The Times wrote that he "more than fulfilled expectation", including scoring a century in his first home match against Worcestershire at Dover and he was awarded his county cap in his first season. In its review of the season the paper said that although he "must be a fine player" but suggested some ways that his technique could be improved; at the end of August the same paper had commented that "his style is not altogether convincing" despite the number of runs he had scored. He played in six of Kent's matches during the season.

Knott went up to Oxford later in 1910 and at the start of the 1911 season he was considered one of the players around whom "interest naturally centred", going up with a "great reputation" and as the "most promising freshman who had gone up to either university in a long time". Plum Warner picked him out as one of the young players who could "keep up the reputation of English cricket in the near future" in that season's edition of Wisden, but Knott failed to live up to his potential in 1911. He made his first-class debut for the university team against Kent but was disappointing in his first season, doing "hardly anything" and failing to win a blue.

It was at rugby that Knott was more successful in his first year at Oxford, winning a blue for the University team and playing for The Rest against England in January 1911. He won further rugby blues in each season from 1911 and 1913 and played in the England team against The Rest in 1912, although he did not win an England cap. Knott played at fly-half in the Oxford team alongside Ronald Poulton at scrum-half, one of the most "exciting and influential" players of the time.

After his disappointing 1911 season, Knott "redeemed to some extent his reputation" in 1912 and was back in the university team, playing in the University Match. He maintained his place in the team and was captain in 1914, although he played rarely for Kent in these seasons and only made 11 appearances for the county team in total, six of which had come during 1910. He never fulfilled his potential as a schoolboy and was considered "that sad disappointment at Oxford" by Sydney Pardon in his editor's notes in Wisden in 1920.

In all Knott made 40 appearances in first-class matches before the outbreak of the First World War, 29 for the university. On graduating he took up a position as a teacher at Marlborough College in August 1914.

== Military service ==
Knott was the last member of his Brasenose common room to enrol in the military, joining the Wiltshire Regiment in December 1914. He was commissioned as a temporary second lieutenant, joining the 7th (Service) Battalion of the regiment which had formed at Devizes, near to where he was teaching at Marlborough. After serving briefly in France in the autumn of 1915, the 26th Division, which the 7th Wiltshire's formed part of, moved to Salonika to form part of the British Salonika Army.

He had been promoted to temporary lieutenant and in September 1916 became a temporary captain. After two periods of illness and having been employed primarily defensively, the 7th Wiltshires took part in the Second Battle of Dorian in April 1917. Every officer in Knott's company was wounded in the attack and he was shot in the left arm, suffering radial nerve damage which significantly effected his ability to play cricket after the war. He was evacuated and recuperated in England before being posted to the 3rd Wiltshires based at Sittingbourne in Kent in April 1918 before resigning his commission in April 1919 due to his wounds. He was awarded the Military Cross (MC) in the 1918 New Year Honours and was mentioned in dispatches for his services in the war.

== Later life ==
Knott returned to teaching after the war, working as a preparatory school teacher at Eastbourne, Haywards Heath and Bexhill-on-Sea between 1920 and 1932. He then became secretary of Worplesdon Gold Club and then NZ Gold Club – he was a scratch player. His wounds prevented his return to "serious cricket", although he played amateur matches for teams such as the Yellowhammers, which he had been a founder member of at Tonbridge School with Leonard Marzetti, and made a further four first-class appearances, three for teams raised by H. D. G. Leveson Gower and once for Sussex County Cricket Club in 1926 and played one match for Kent's Second XI in 1921.

He lived in Surrey for most of the inter-war period with his wife Joan whom he had married in 1922. The couple had two sons. At the outbreak of the Second World War Knott was working for a company which dealt with Morris Motors and MG Cars. He joined the Royal Army Service Corps and served as an instructor throughout the war with the rank of temporary major.

Knott died after a short illness in February 1972 at Woking aged 80. His brother, John Knott, also played for Oxford and Kent in the inter-war years.
