= John Nott (physician) =

English physician and classical scholar

John Nott (1751–1825) was an English physician and classical scholar.

== Life ==
Born at Worcester on 24 December 1751, he was son of Samuel Nott, a German courtier in favour with George III. He studied surgery in Birmingham, under the instruction of Edmund Hector; in London under Sir Cæsar Hawkins, with whose family he was connected; and in Paris. About 1775 he went to the continent of Europe with an invalid gentleman, and stayed there for two years, returning to London. In 1783 he travelled to China, as surgeon in an East India vessel, and during his absence of three years learnt the Persian language; and soon after returning to England he accompanied his brother and his family on a journey abroad for their health, and did not return until 1788.

Nott was still without a degree in medicine, and, on the advice of Richard Warren, he became an extra-licentiate of the College of Physicians of London on 8 October 1789. On Warren's recommendation he attended Georgiana Cavendish, Duchess of Devonshire and her sister Lady Duncannon, as their physician, to the continent, and continued in that post until 1793. He then settled at Hotwells, Bristol, and remained there.

For the last eight years of his life Nott suffered from hemiplegia, and was confined to his house. He died in a boarding-house, Dowry Square, Clifton, Bristol, on 23 July 1825, and was buried in the old burial-ground at Clifton.

== Works ==
Nott was the author of:

- Alonzo; or the Youthful Solitaire: a tale (anon.), 1772.
- Leonora; an Elegy on the Death of a Young Lady (anon.), 1775.
- Kisses: being an English Translation in Verse of the Basia of Joannes Secundus Nicolaius, with Latin Text and an Essay on his Life, 1775.
- Sonnets and Odes of Petrarch, translated (anon.), 1777; reprinted in January 1808, as by the translator of Catullus.
- Poems, consisting of Original Pieces and Translations, 1780.
- Heroic Epistle in Verse, from Vestris in London to Mademoiselle Heinel in France (anon.), 1781.
- Propertii Monobiblos, or that Book of Propertius called Cythnia, translated into English verse, 1782.
- Select Odes from Hafiz, translated into English verse, 1787.
- Chemical Dissertation on the Thermal Water of Pisa, and on the neighbouring Spring of Asciano, with Analytical Papers [by Henri Struve] on the Sulphureous Water of Yverdun, 1793. This was the substance of an Italian treatise by Giorgio Santi, professor of chemistry in Pisa University: Nott had spent two winters in Pisa.
- Of the Hot-Well Waters near Bristol, 1793.
- A Posologic Companion to the London Pharmacopœia, 1793; 3rd ed. 1811.
- The Poems of Caius Valerius Catullus in English Verse, with the Latin text versified and classical notes, 1794, 2 vols.
- Belinda; or the Kisses of Bonefonius of Auvergne, with Latin text, 1797.
- The Nature of Things. The First Book of Lucretius, with Latin text, 1799.
- Odes of Horace, with Latin text, 1803, 2 vols.
- Sappho, after a Greek Romance (anon.), 1803.
- On the Influenza at Bristol in the Spring of 1803, 1803.
- Select Poems from the Hesperides of Herrick, with occasional remarks by J. N. [1810]; criticised by Barron Field in the Quarterly Review for 1810.
- Songs and Sonnets of Henry Howard, earl of Surrey, Sir Thomas Wyatt, and others [1812].
- The Gulls Hornbook, by T. Decker, with notes of illustration by J. N., 1812.

Nott contributed to the Gentleman's Magazine, and to other journals, literary and medical. Nott's verse renderings of the poems of Catullus, Propertius, and of the Basia of Johannes Secundus, were reprinted in Bohn's Classical Library. His translation of Catullus was the first English translation of the complete works of the poet.

Nott seems to have assisted John Mathew Gutch in preparing a reprint of George Wither's works. A few trial copies were issued by Gutch in 1820, in 3 vols. Charles Lamb possessed a copy of these Selections from the Lyric and Satiric Poems of George Wither, interleaved with manuscript notes by Nott that irritated him.

== Family ==
Nott's nephew, executor and heir was the Rev. George Frederick Nott.

== Notes ==
Attribution

This article incorporates text from a publication now in the public domain: Lee, Sidney, ed. (1895). "Nott, John". Dictionary of National Biography. Vol. 41. London: Smith, Elder & Co.
