= Jon Knott =

American baseball player (born 1978)

- Left fielder
- Born: August 4, 1978 (age 47); Manassas, Virginia, U.S.
- Batted: Right Threw: Right

MLB debut
- May 30, 2004, for the San Diego Padres

Last MLB appearance
- July 22, 2007, for the Baltimore Orioles

MLB statistics
- Batting average: .194
- Hits: 6
- Runs batted in: 5
- Stats at Baseball Reference

Teams
- San Diego Padres (2004, 2006); Baltimore Orioles (2007)

Jonathan David Knott (born August 4, 1978) is an American former professional baseball outfielder. He played in Major League Baseball for the San Diego Padres and Baltimore Orioles.

== Career ==
After graduating in 2001 with a Master of Business Administration degree from Mississippi State University, Knott was signed by Mal Fichman as an amateur free agent with the San Diego Padres. He made his major league debut on May 30, 2004. He became a free agent on December 12, 2006, after he was not offered a contract by the Padres. He signed a minor league contract with the Baltimore Orioles nine days later.

In 2006, Knott led the Pacific Coast League in home runs and RBI 32 and 113, respectively. Knott was the first Portland Beavers player to top the PCL in home runs since 1991 and he was the first Portland batter to win the RBI title in the leagues modern era.

Knott was recalled to the Orioles on June 23, 2007, to replace the injured Miguel Tejada. He was optioned back to the Norfolk Tides on June 29. He was recalled again on July 14, this time to occupy the roster spot vacated when third baseman Melvin Mora went on the disabled list. Knott was designated for assignment by the Orioles on September 9, 2007, and became a free agent at the end of the season.

On January 6, 2008, he signed a minor league deal with the Minnesota Twins. Knott opened the 2008 season with the Twins' Triple-A team, the Rochester Red Wings. He played in 17 games for the Red Wings, batting .182 with a home run and three RBI. He was traded to the Philadelphia Phillies during the season and became a free agent after the season ended. He was signed by the independent Atlantic League's Camden Riversharks on May 29, 2009. On August 25, 2009 Knott was signed by the Milwaukee Brewers and assigned to their Triple-A affiliate, the Nashville Sounds. He filed for free agency after the season.
