= John Knott (cricketer) =

English cricketer (1901–1988)

Personal information
- Full name: Charles Harold Knott
- Born: 20 March 1901; Tunbridge Wells, Kent
- Died: 18 June 1988 (aged 87); Tonbridge, Kent
- Batting: Right-handed
- Bowling: Right-arm leg-break
- Relatives: Freddie Knott (brother)

Domestic team information
- Years: Team
- 1921–1939: Kent
- 1922–1924: Oxford University

Career statistics
Competition	First-class
Matches	136
Runs scored	5,633
Batting average	31.46
100s/50s	9/31
Top score	261*
Balls bowled	1,129
Wickets	24
Bowling average	27.50
5 wickets in innings	0
10 wickets in match	0
Best bowling	4/24
Catches/stumpings	66/–
- Source: CricInfo, 4 June 2016

Charles Harold Knott (20 March 1901 – 18 June 1988), known as John Knott, was an English amateur cricketer who played in the inter-war period. Knott played mainly for Kent County Cricket Club and Oxford University, making a total of 136 first-class cricket appearances during his career.

Knott attended Tonbridge School and made his first-class cricket debut for Kent in 1921 after completing school, appearing in a County Championship against Nottinghamshire. He attended Oxford University, gaining a cricket Blue and playing in three varsity matches between 1922 and 1924. He continued playing for Kent during his years at university before becoming a teacher at Tonbridge where he was master-in-charge of cricket, coaching, amongst others, Colin Cowdrey.

Knott was considered a powerful batsman who could drive effectively. He played for Kent mainly during the school holidays when not working. His brother, Freddie Knott, had played cricket for Kent before World War I. Knott died in 1988. At the time of his death he was the oldest living Kent player and the oldest to have gained a cricket Blue at Oxford.

== Bibliography ==
- Carlaw, Derek (2020). Kent County Cricketers, A to Z: Part Two (1919–1939) (PDF). Cardiff: ACS.
