= Gibson (guitar company) =

American musical instrument manufacturer

Coordinates: 36.1298758°N 86.7257458°W

Gibson, Inc.

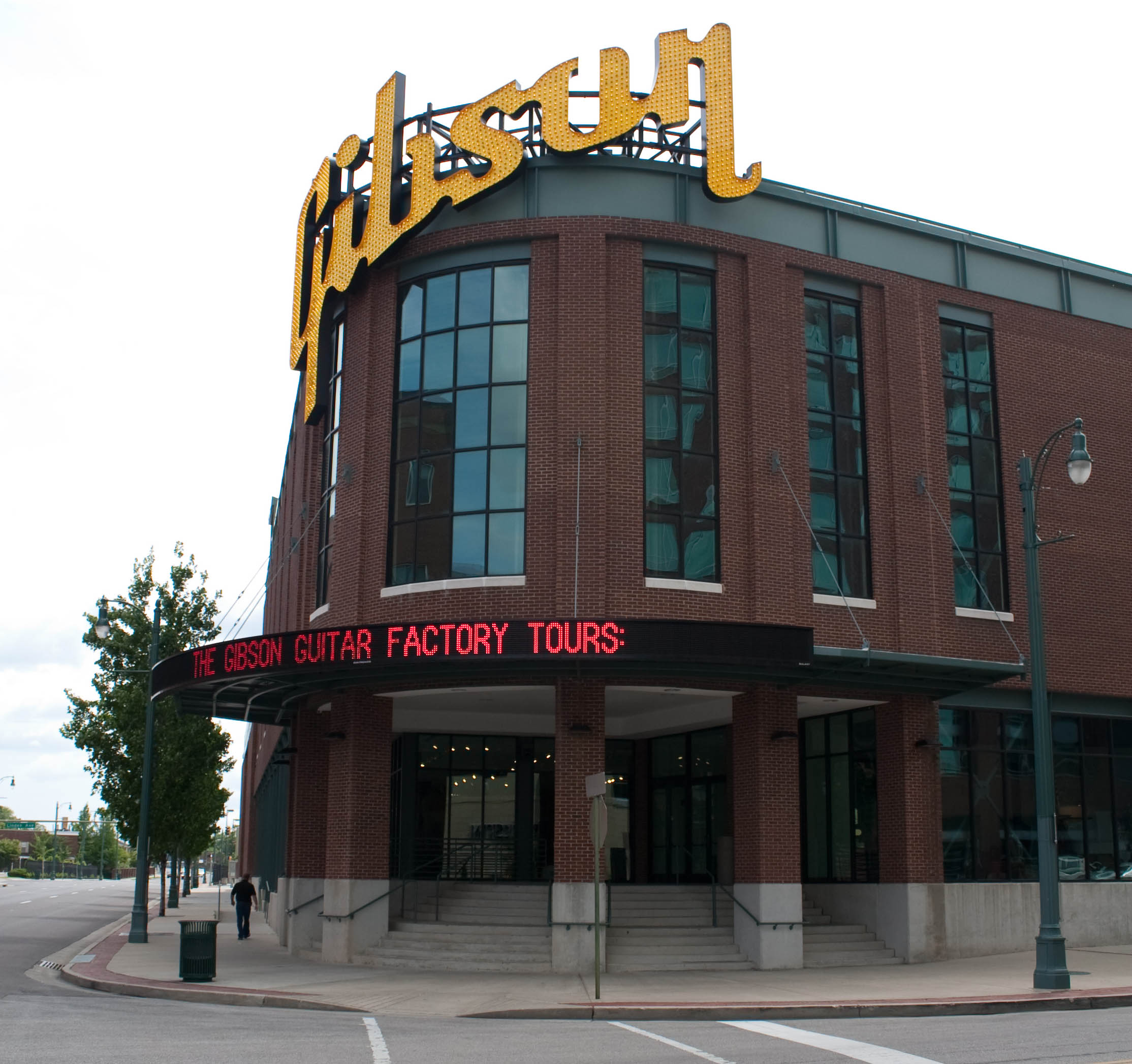
- Gibson Guitar Factory in Memphis, Tennessee in May 2009
- Formerly: Gibson Guitar Corp. and Gibson Brands, Inc.
- Type: Private
- Industry: Musical instruments
- Founded: 1894; 132 years ago in Kalamazoo, Michigan
- Founder: Orville Gibson
- Headquarters: Nashville, Tennessee, United States
- Area served: Worldwide
- Key people: Cesar Gueikian (Member of the Board of Directors) Anne Rohosy (interim president and CEO)
- Products: Electric and acoustic guitars, basses, strings
- Brands: List: KRK; Epiphone; Maestro; Kramer; Steinberger; Gibson Amplifiers; Dobro; Kalamazoo; Original; Orville; Tobias; Baldwin Signature Series; Slingerland; Talent; Chibson
- Owner: KKR & Co. Inc.
- Subsidiaries: List: Baldwin; Epiphone; Kramer; KRK Systems; Mesa Boogie; Steinberger; Tobias; Chibson
- Website: gibson.com

Gibson, Inc. (formerly Gibson Guitar Corporation and Gibson Brands Inc.) is an American manufacturer of guitars, other musical instruments, and professional audio equipment from Kalamazoo, Michigan, and now based in Nashville, Tennessee.

Orville Gibson started making instruments in 1894 and founded the company in 1902 as the Gibson Mandolin-Guitar Mfg. Co. Ltd. in Kalamazoo, Michigan, to make mandolin-family instruments. Gibson invented archtop guitars by constructing the same type of carved, arched tops used on violins. By the 1930s, the company was also making flattop acoustic guitars, as well as one of the first commercially available hollow-body electric guitars, used and popularized by Charlie Christian. In 1944, Gibson was bought by Chicago Musical Instruments (CMI), which was acquired in 1969 by Panama-based conglomerate Ecuadorian Company Limited (ECL), that changed its name in the same year to Norlin Corporation. Gibson was owned by Norlin Corporation from 1969 to 1986. In 1986, the company was acquired by a group led by Henry Juszkiewicz and David H. Berryman. In November 2018, the company was acquired by a group of investors led by private equity firm Kohlberg Kravis Roberts (KKR).

Gibson sells guitars under a variety of brand names and builds some of the world's best-known guitars. Gibson was at the forefront of innovation in acoustic guitars, especially in the big band era of the 1930s; the Gibson Super 400 was widely imitated. In 1952, Gibson introduced its first solid-body electric guitar, the Les Paul, which became its most popular guitar to date—designed by a team led by Ted McCarty.

In addition to guitars, Gibson offers consumer electronics through the Gibson Pro Audio division, which includes KRK.

On May 1, 2018, the company filed for Chapter 11 bankruptcy protection, and announced a restructuring plan to return to profitability by closing down unprofitable consumer electronics divisions such as Gibson Innovations. The company exited Chapter 11 bankruptcy in November 2018.

In January 2020, the company launched Gibson TV, an online television network focused on guitars and music culture.

== History ==
=== Gibson Mandolin-Guitar Manufacturing ===
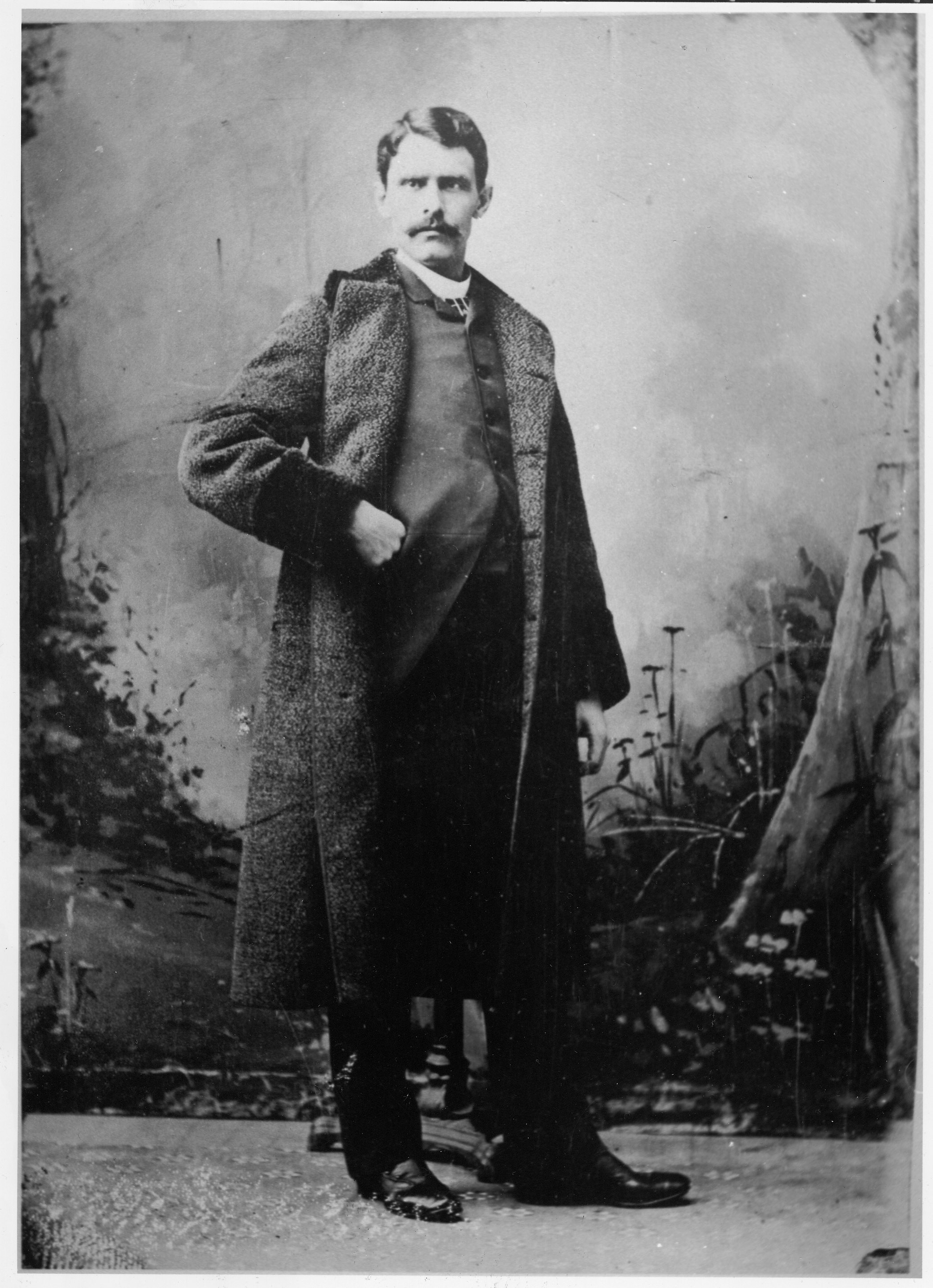
Orville Gibson, founder

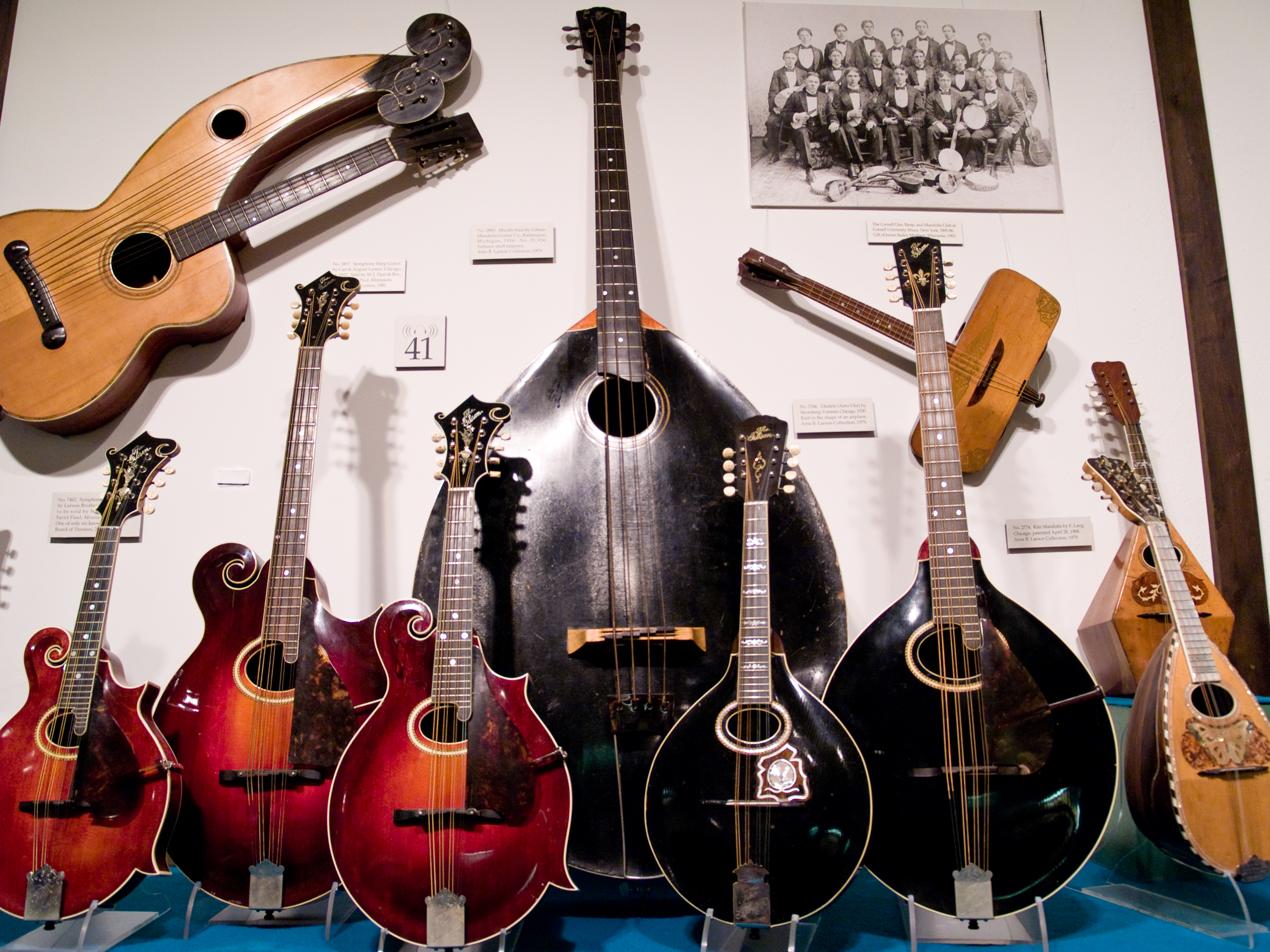
Gibson line of Mandolin orchestra instruments, early 1900s.

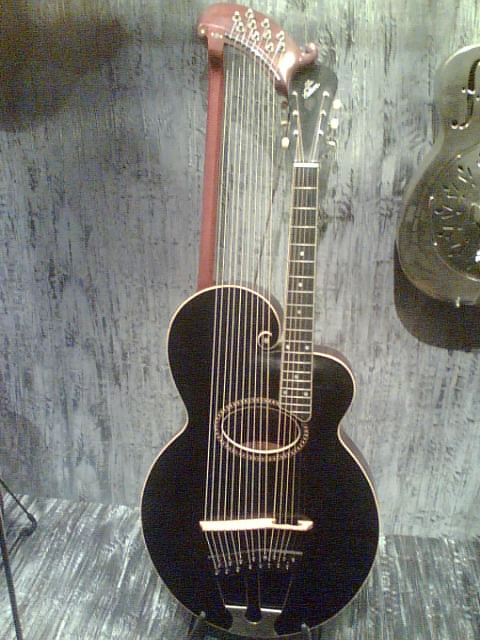
Harp guitar (c. 1912).

Gibson patented a single-piece mandolin design in 1898 that he believed provided a unique sound quality. Orville Gibson began to sell his instruments in 1894 out of a one-room workshop in Kalamazoo, Michigan. In 1902, the Gibson Mandolin-Guitar Mfg. Co. Ltd. was incorporated to market the instruments. Initially, the company produced only Orville Gibson's original designs. The company moved into the Gibson, Inc. Factory and Office Building in 1917. Orville died in 1918 of endocarditis (inflammation of the inside lining of the heart chambers and valves).

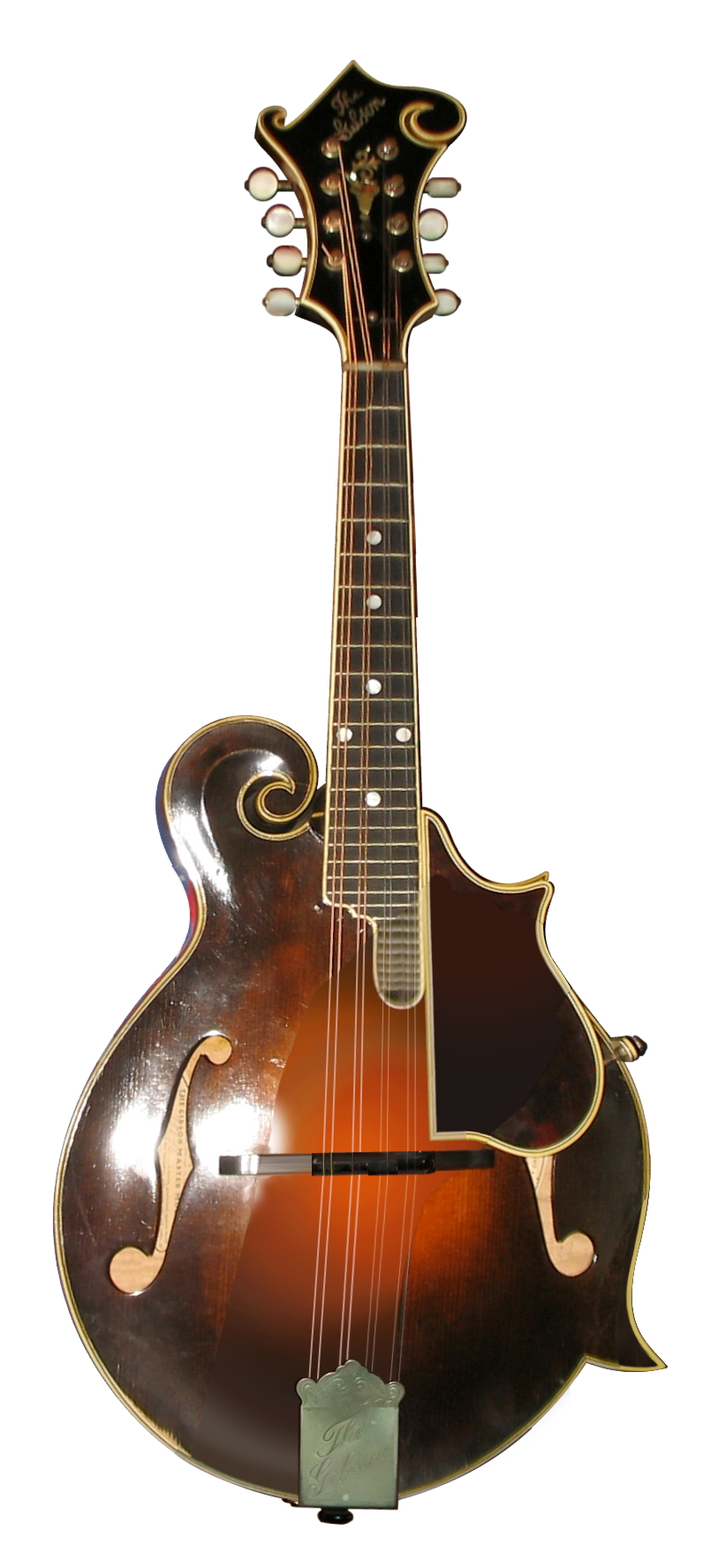
1924 F-5 mandolin (with f-holes)

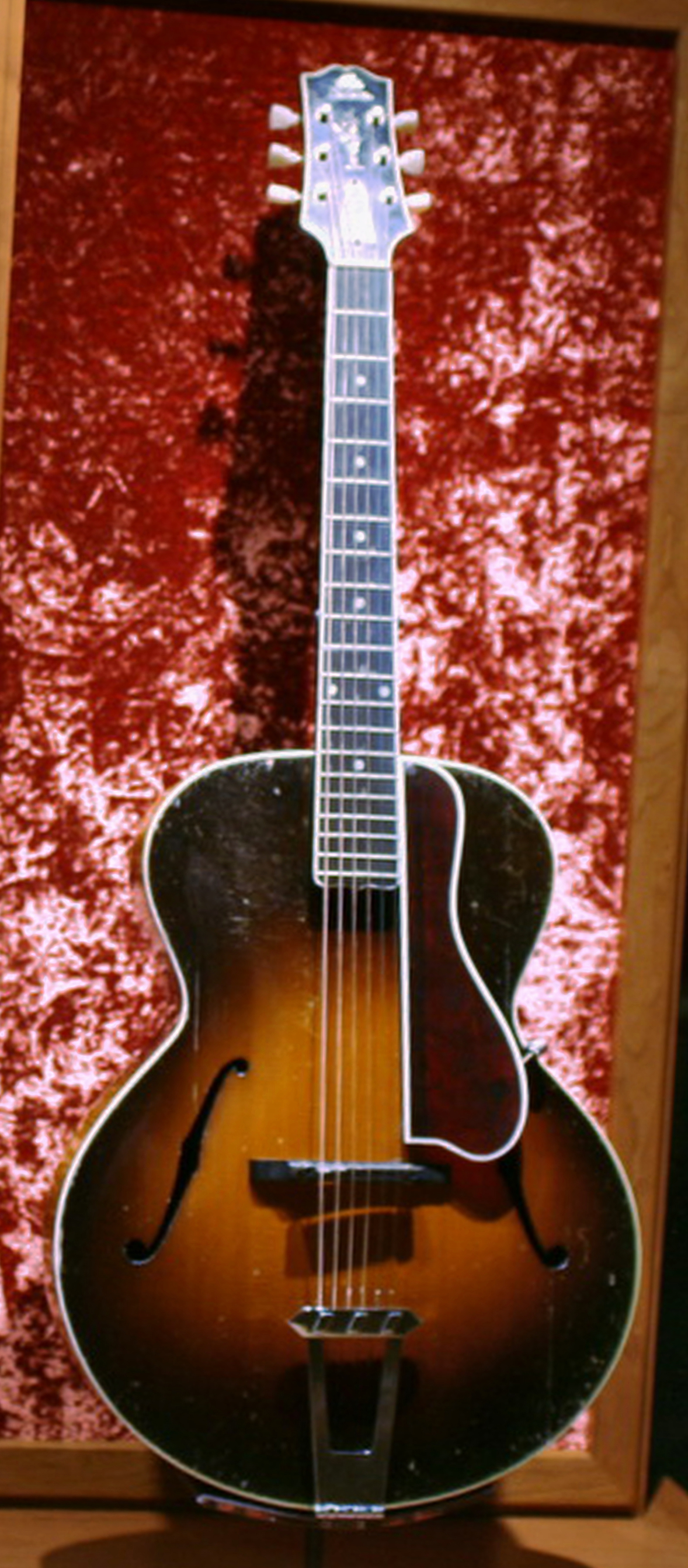
1928 L-5 acoustic guitar

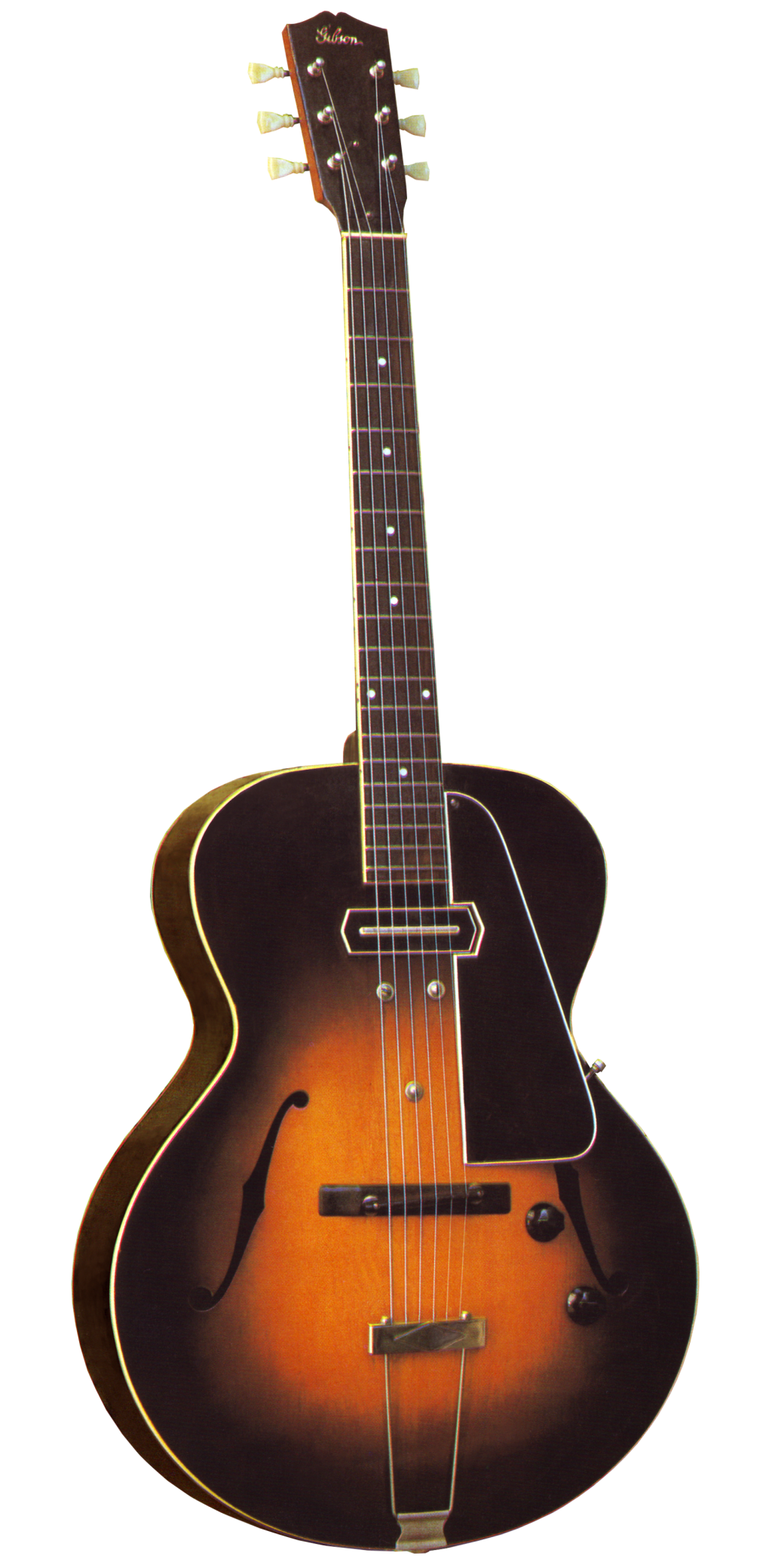
ES-150 electric guitar (1936–1957)

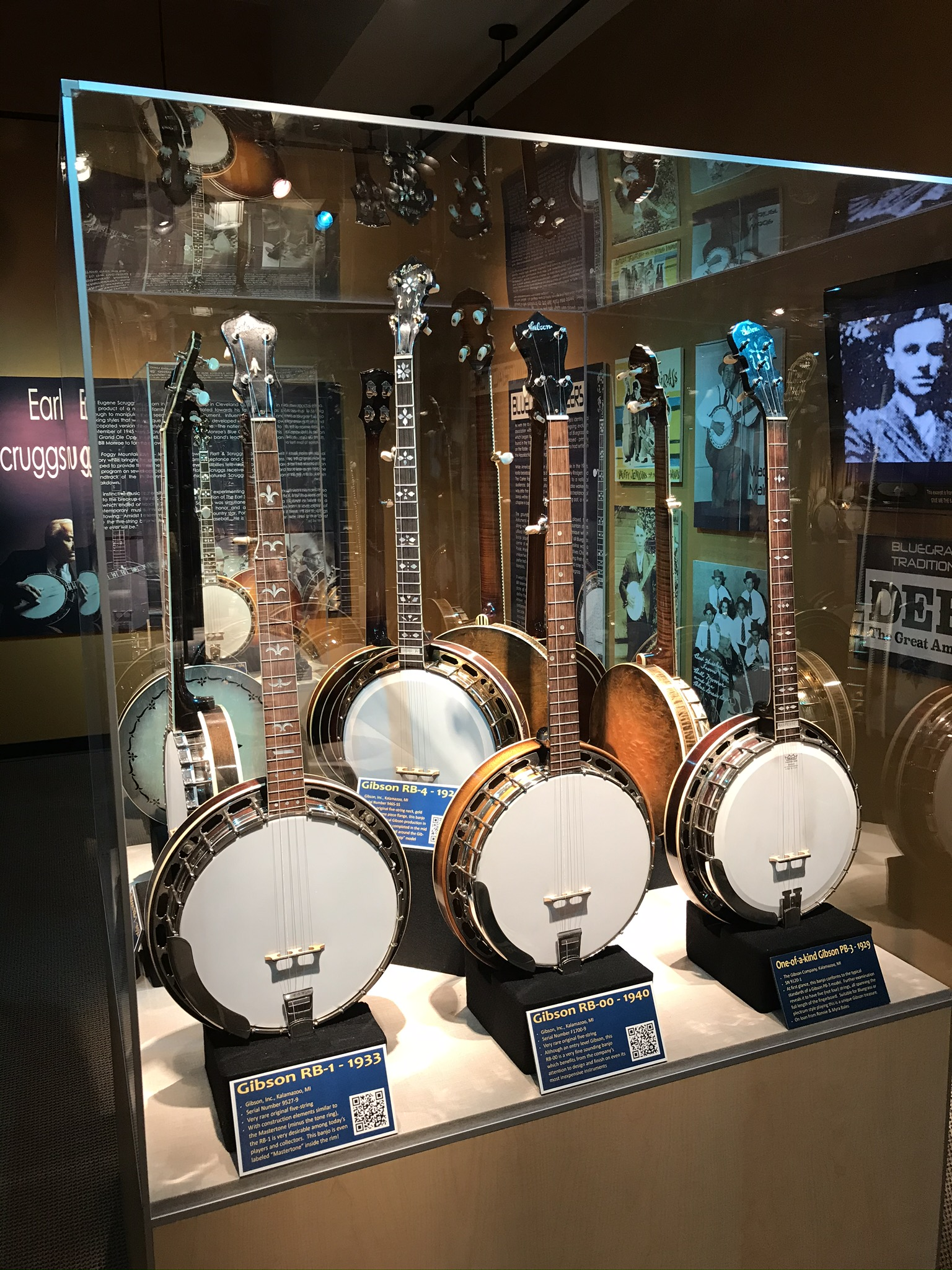
Prewar Gibson banjos: RB-1 (1933), RB-00 (1940), PB-3 (1929)

The following year, the company hired designer Lloyd Loar to create newer instruments. Loar designed the flagship L-5 archtop guitar and the Gibson F-5 mandolin that was introduced in 1922, before leaving the company in 1924. In 1936, Gibson introduced its first "Electric Spanish" model, the ES-150, followed by other electric instruments like steel guitars, banjos and mandolins.

Following Loar, Guy Hart was the next major figure to influence the company. Musician-writer Walter Carter called the next two decades "The Guy Hart Era" and spelled it out in his definitive history of the company:.

"Guy Hart ran Gibson from 1924-1948 -- the most important period in the company history since the debut of Gibson instruments at the turn of the century and, moreover, the period of greatest innovation for the guitar since the emergence of the six-string guitar in the late 1700s. As the guitar rose to prominence, so did Gibson. Under Hart's management, Gibson developed the Super 400 … still considered the best of their kind … the flattop line and the SJ-200 [that] put Gibson in a class by itself [and] Gibson's prominent place in the electric guitar market."

During the global economic depression of the 1930s Hart "kept the company in business and kept the paychecks coming for the workers," in part by introducing a line of high-quality wooden toys. "And as the country began its economic recovery in the mid 1930s, he ... opened new markets overseas." Then in the 1940s he led the company through World War II by converting the factory to wartime production, winning an Army-Navy "E" award for excellence. After the war he returned the factory to instruments before he retired.

During World War II, instrument manufacturing at Gibson slowed due to shortages of wood and metal, and Gibson began manufacturing wood and metal parts for the military. Between 1942 and 1945, Gibson employed women to manufacture guitars. "Women produced nearly 25,000 guitars during World War II yet Gibson denied ever building instruments over this period", according to a 2013 history of the company. This denial was contradicted by historical statements. Gibson folklore has also claimed its guitars were made by "seasoned craftsmen" who were "too old for war". In 2023, a 1943 Gibson Southern Jumbo was listed for sale with an asking price of $18,500.

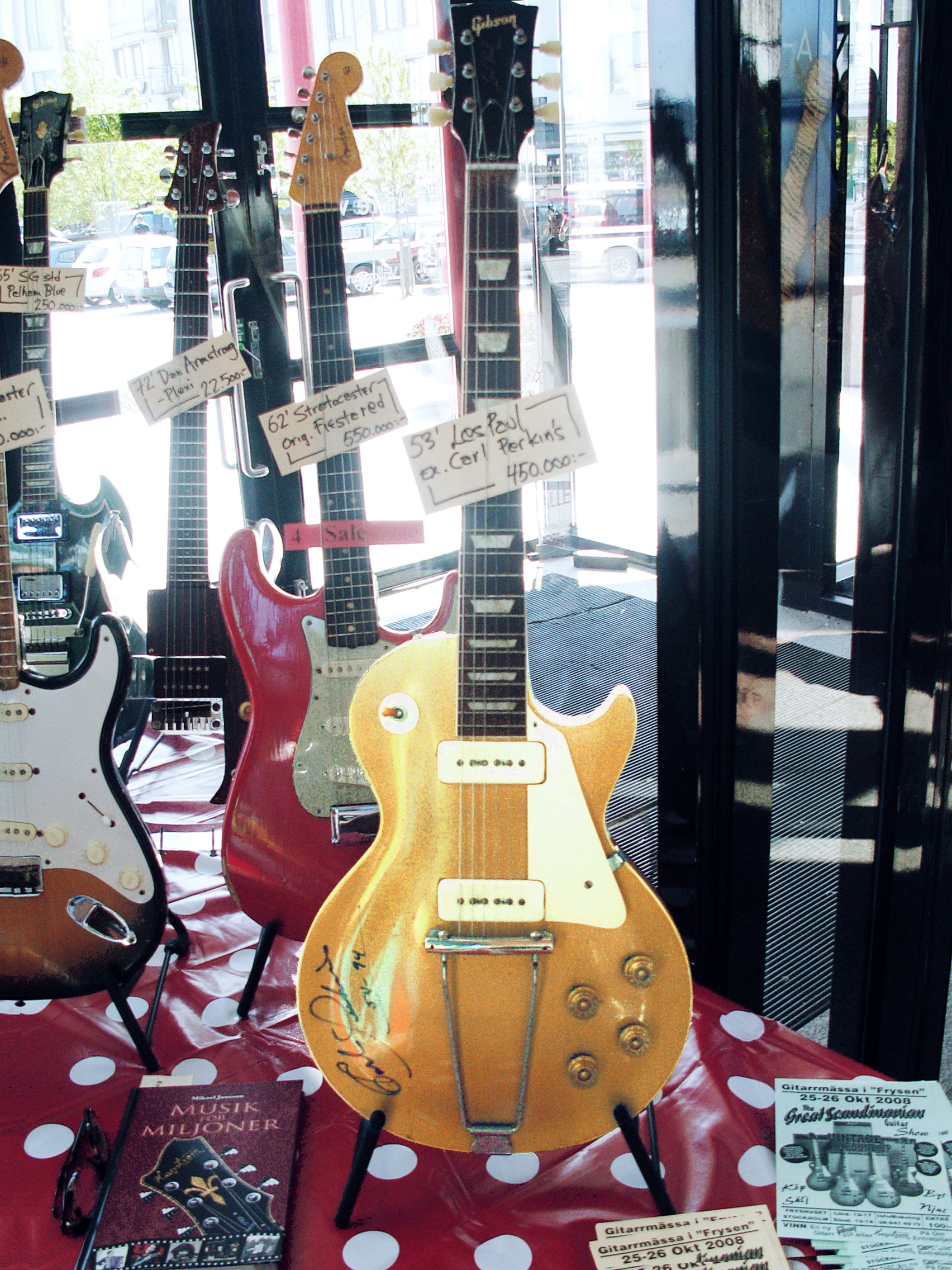
1953 Les Paul Goldtop

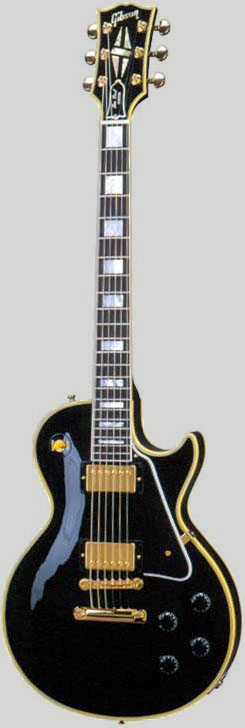
Les Paul Custom

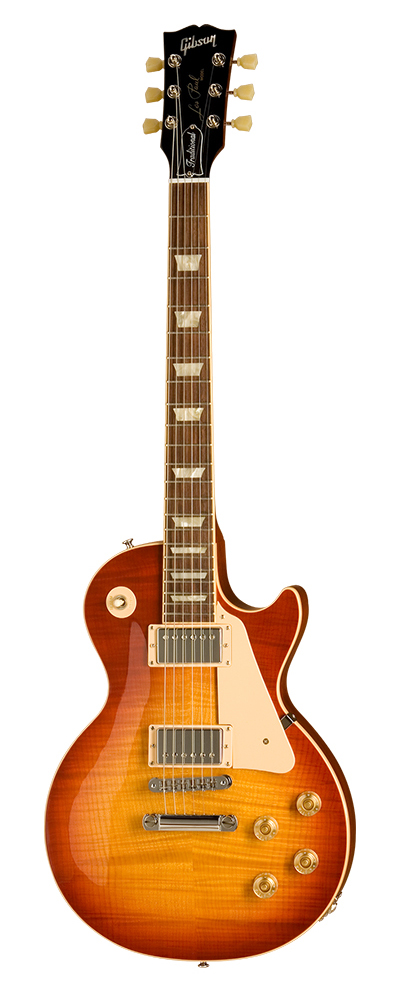
Les Paul Standard

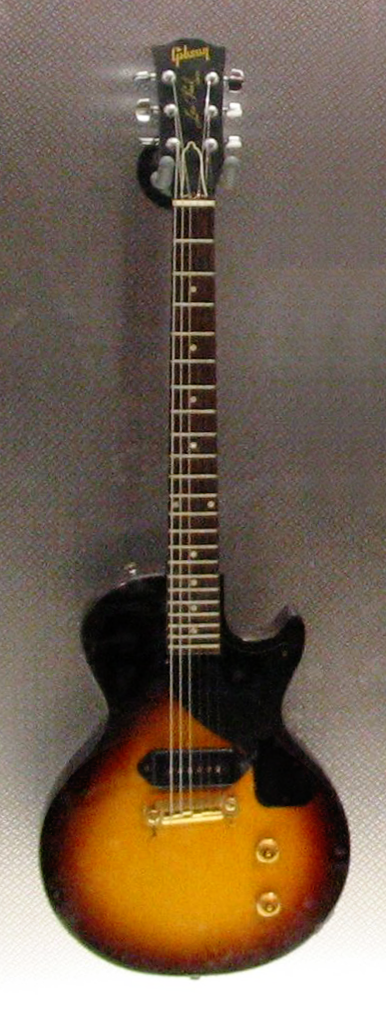
Les Paul Junior

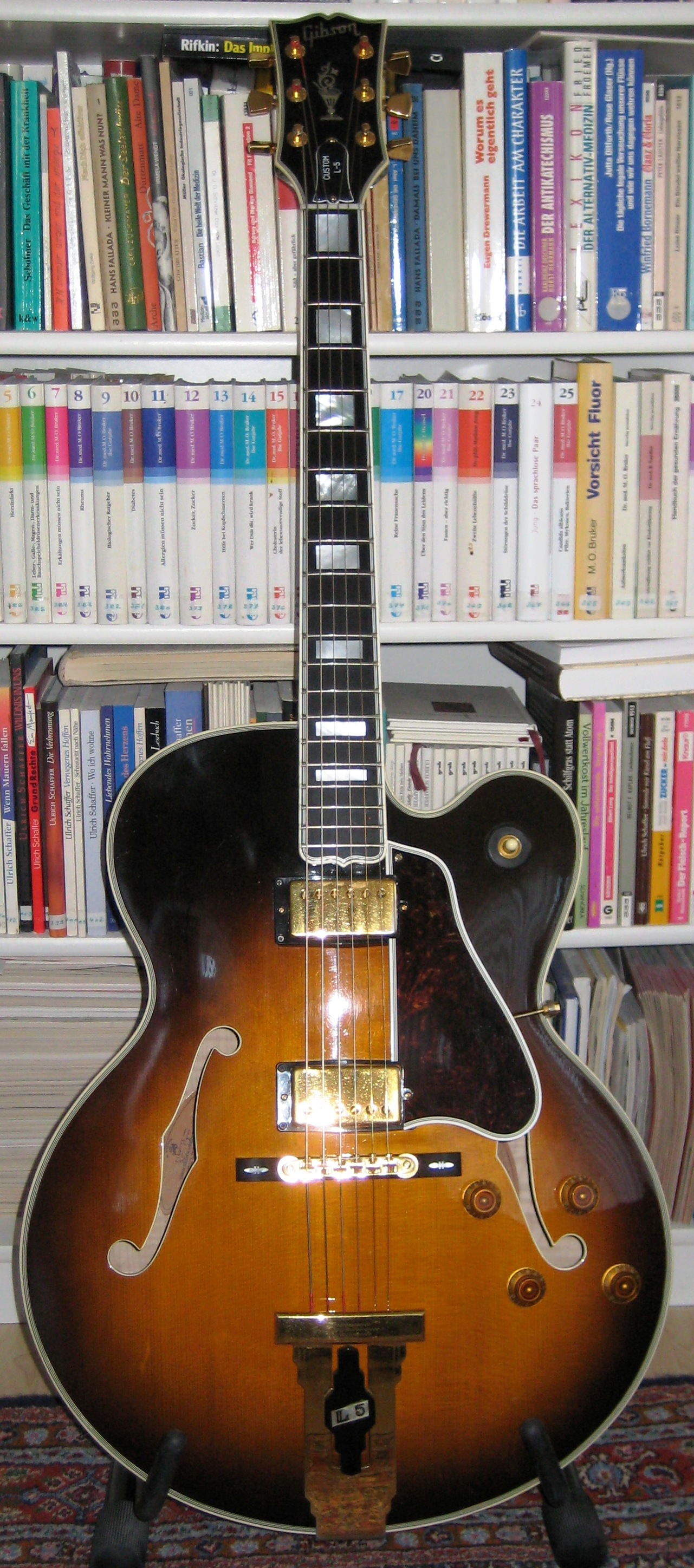
L-5 CES

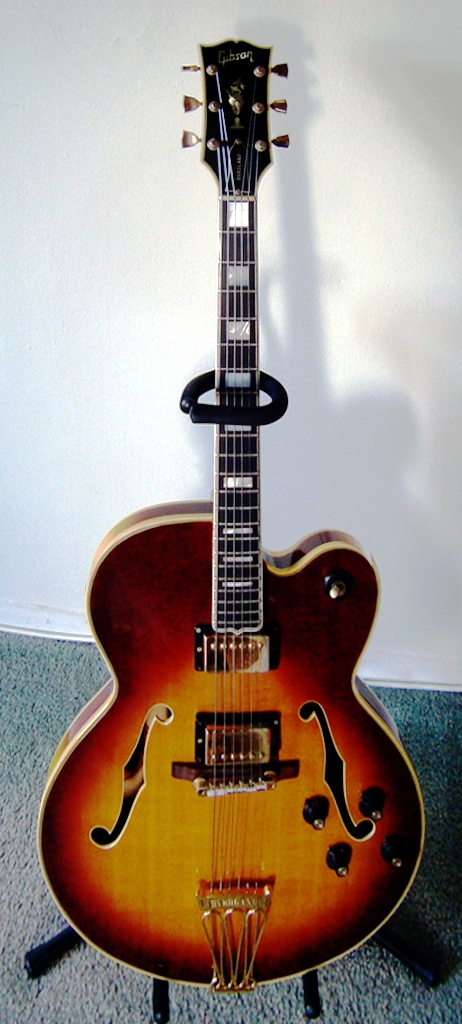
Byrdland

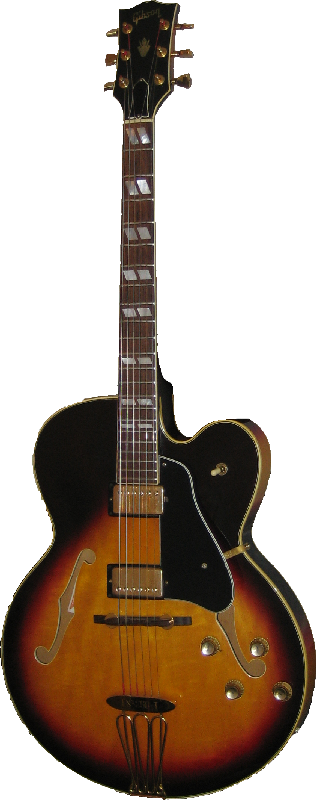
ES-350T

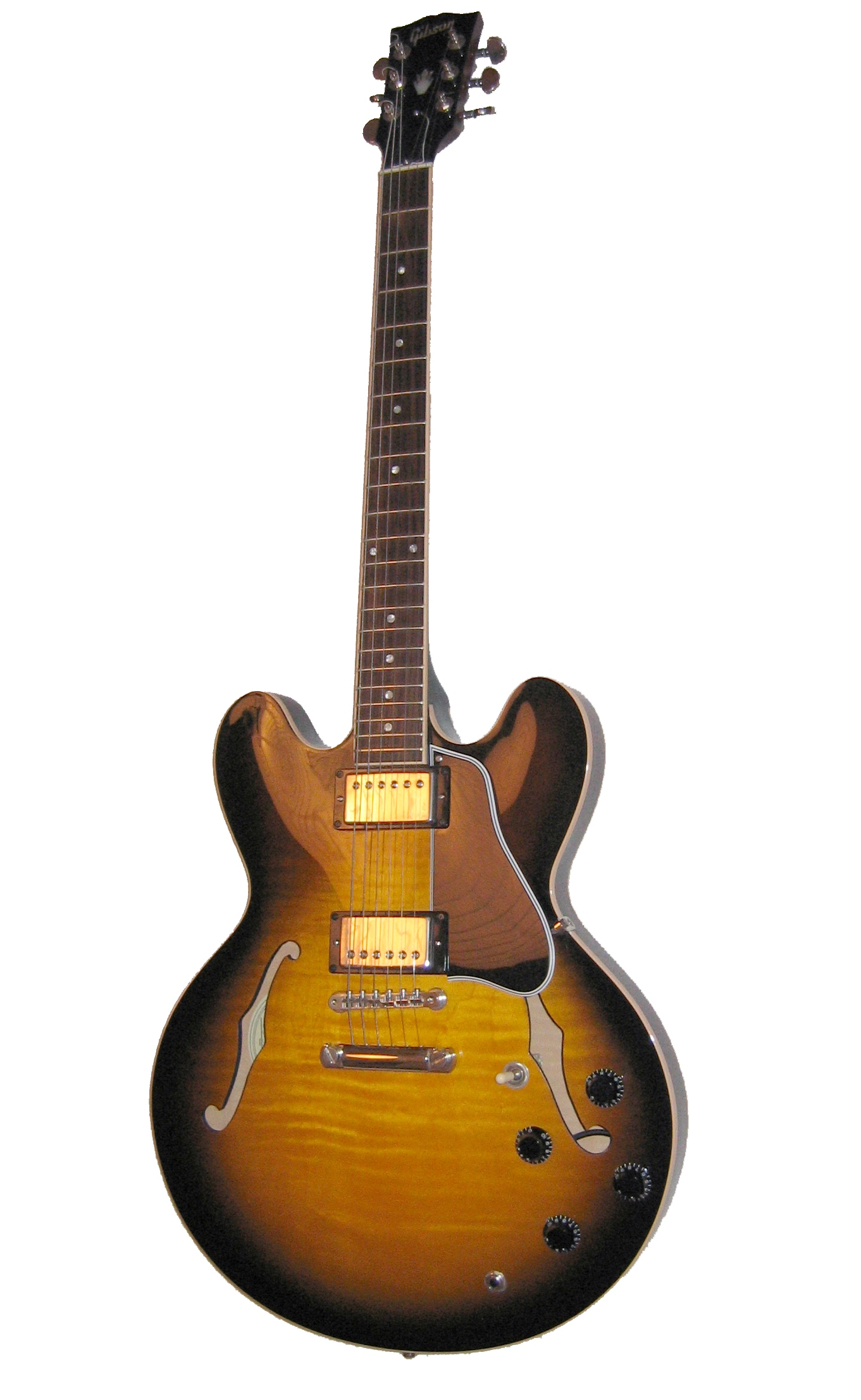
ES-335T

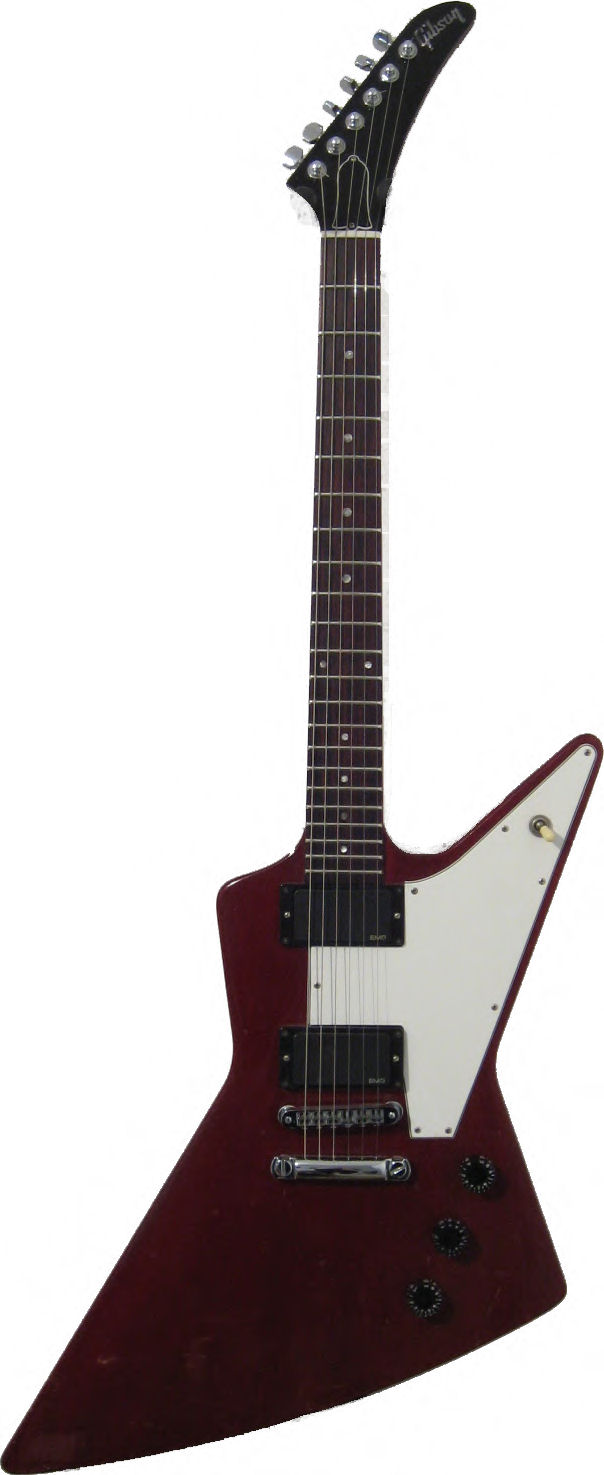
Explorer

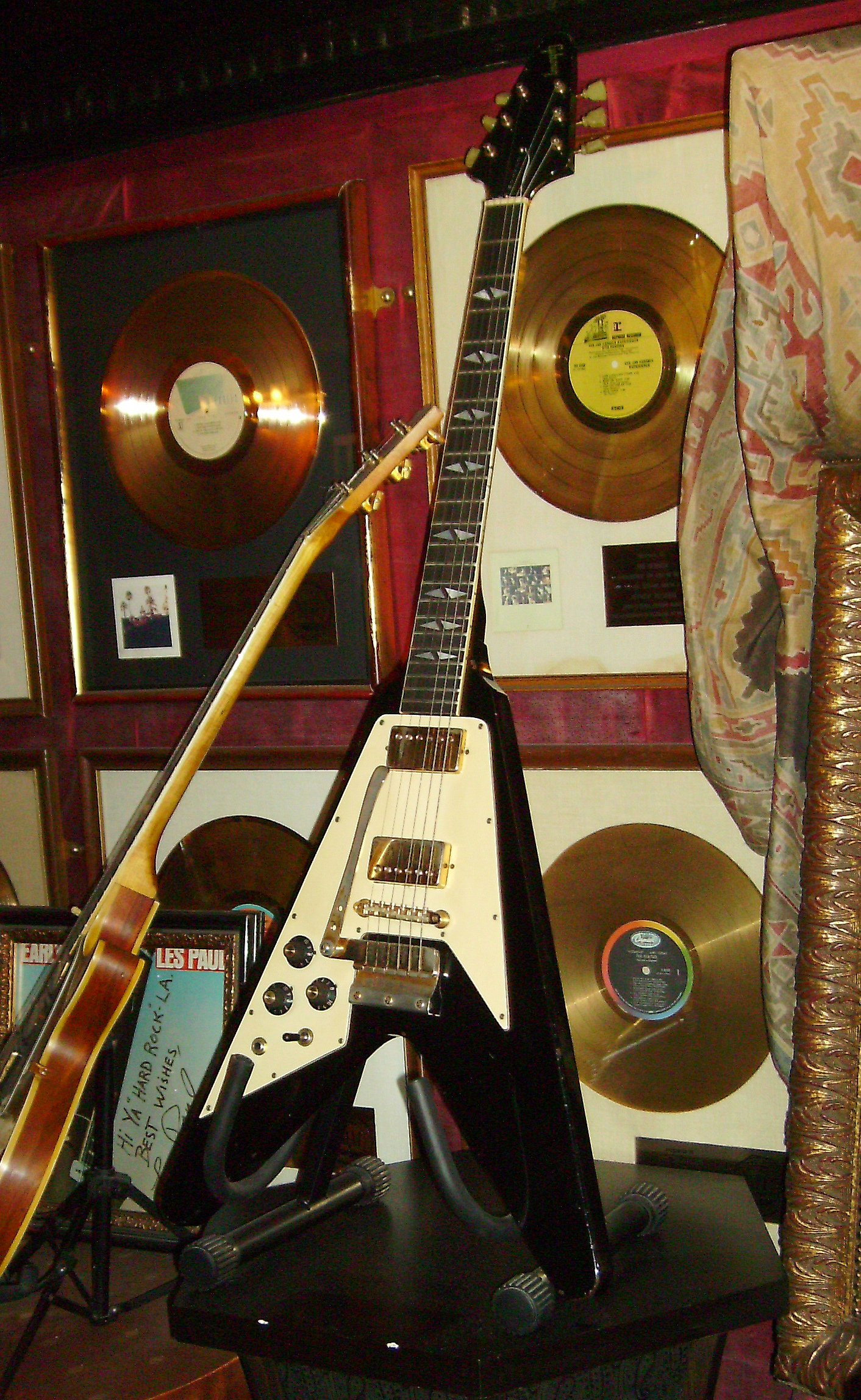
Flying V

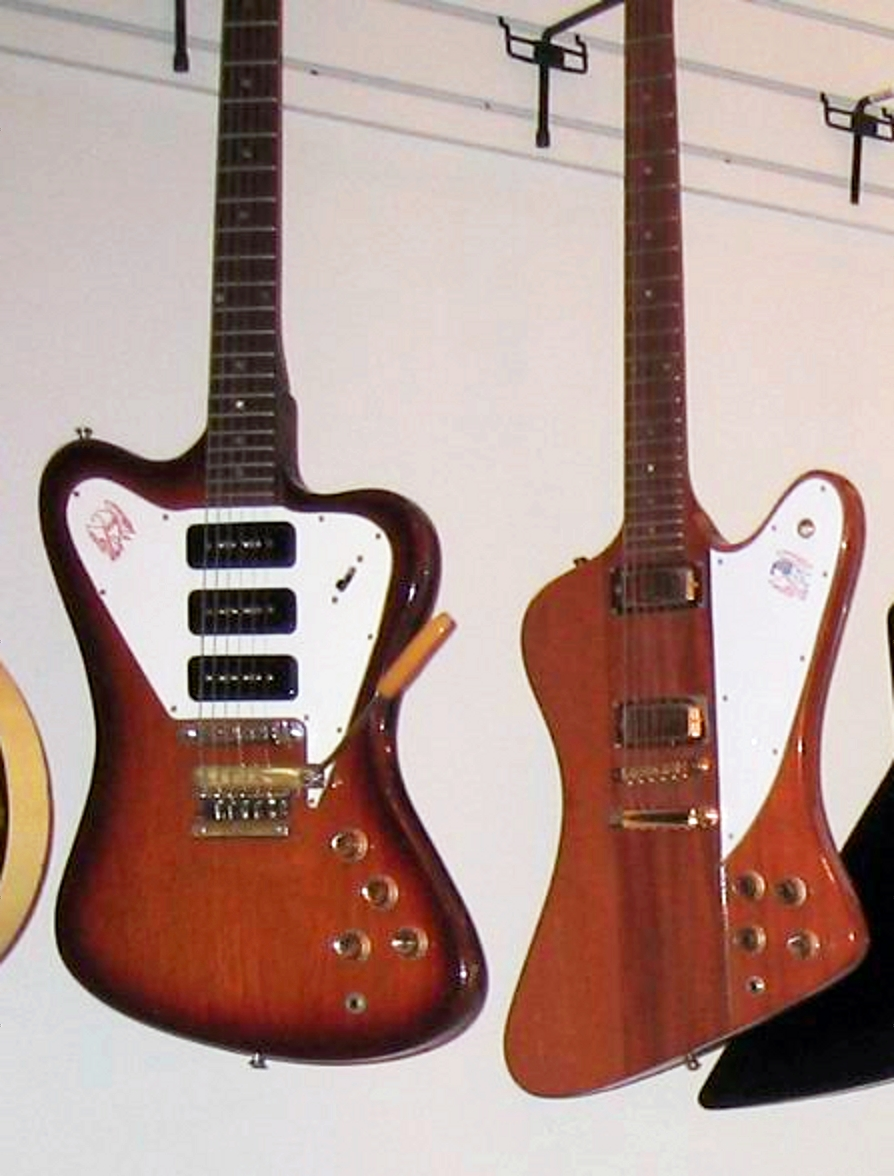
non-reverse (left) & reverse Firebird

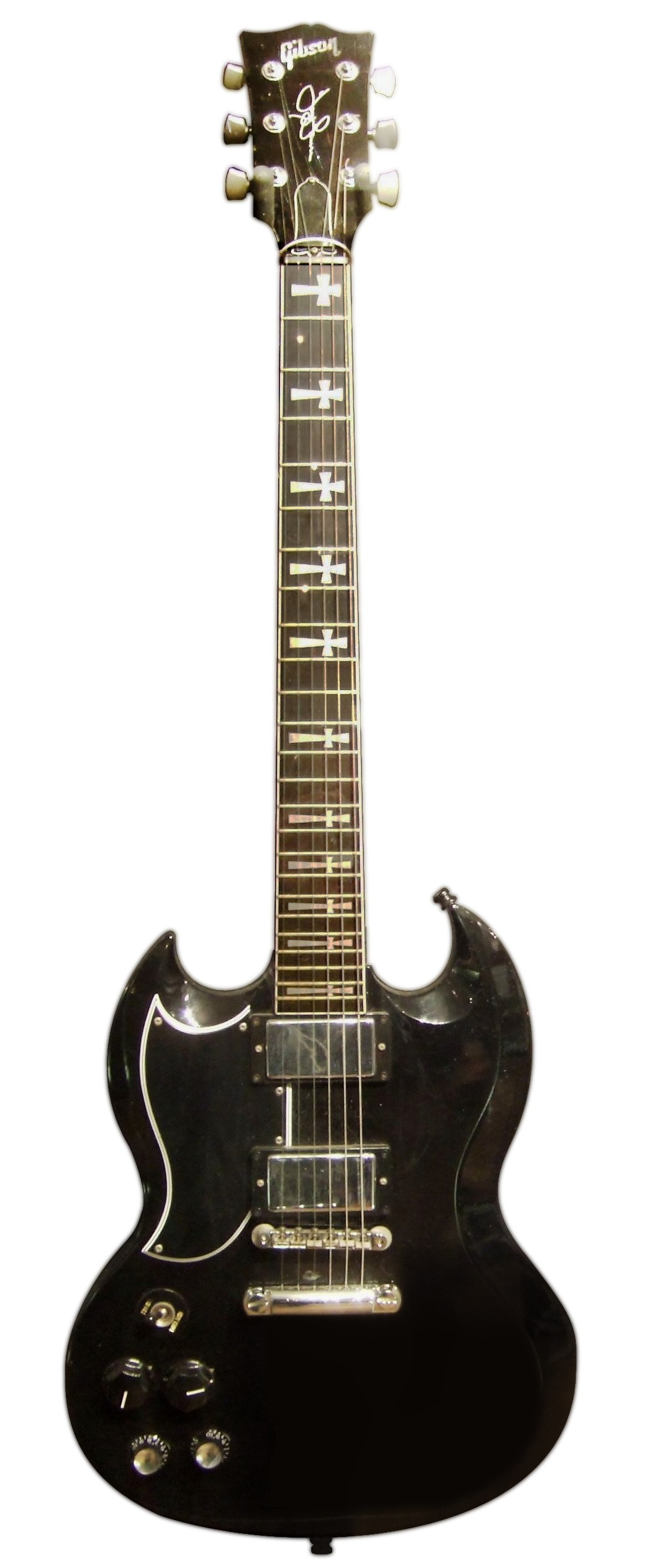
SG

=== Chicago Musical Instruments ===
In 1944, Gibson was purchased by Chicago Musical Instruments. The ES-175 was introduced in 1949. Gibson hired Ted McCarty in 1948, who became president in 1950. He led an expansion of the guitar line with new guitars such as the "Les Paul" guitar introduced in 1952, endorsed by Les Paul, a popular musician in the 1950s. The guitar was offered in Custom, Standard, Special, and Junior models.

In the mid-1950s, the Thinline series was produced, which included a line of thinner guitars like the Byrdland. The first Byrdlands were slim, custom built, L-5 models for guitarists Billy Byrd and Hank Garland. Later, a shorter neck was added. Other models such as the ES-350T and the ES-225T were introduced as less costly alternatives. In 1958, Gibson introduced the ES-335T model. Similar in size to the hollow-body Thinlines, the ES-335 family had a solid center, giving the string tone a longer sustain.

In the 1950s, Gibson also produced the Tune-o-matic bridge system and its version of the humbucking pickup, the PAF ("Patent Applied For"), first released in 1957 and still sought after for its sound.

In 1958, Gibson produced two new designs: the eccentrically shaped Explorer and Flying V. These "modernistic" guitars did not sell well initially. It was only in the late 70s when the two guitars were reintroduced to the market that they sold well. The Firebird, in the early 60s, was a reprise of the modernistic idea, though less extreme.

In the late 1950s, McCarty knew that Gibson was seen as a traditional company and began an effort to create more modern guitars. In 1961 the body design of the Les Paul was changed due to the demand for a double cutaway body design. The new body design then became known as the SG (for "solid guitar"), due to disapproval from Les Paul himself. The original Les Paul design returned to the Gibson catalog in 1968.

Gibson's production mix in the 1960s had to respond to a changing buyer's market. In 1969, Gibson executive Julius Bellson noted that "Four years ago, electric guitars account for almost 70 per cent of our guitar sales. Today their sales are below 50 percent."

=== Norlin Corporation and move to Nashville ===
On December 22, 1969, Gibson parent company Chicago Musical Instruments was taken over by the South American brewing conglomerate ECL. Gibson remained under the control of CMI until 1974 when it became a subsidiary of Norlin Musical Instruments. Norlin Musical Instruments was a member of Norlin Industries which was named for ECL president Norton Stevens and CMI president Arnold Berlin. This began an era characterized by corporate mismanagement and decreasing product quality.

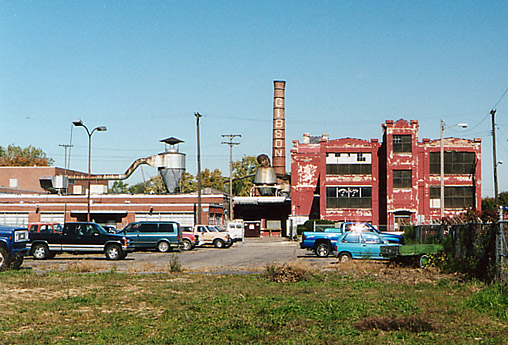
Gibson left Kalamazoo in 1984, and their previous factory became Heritage Guitars

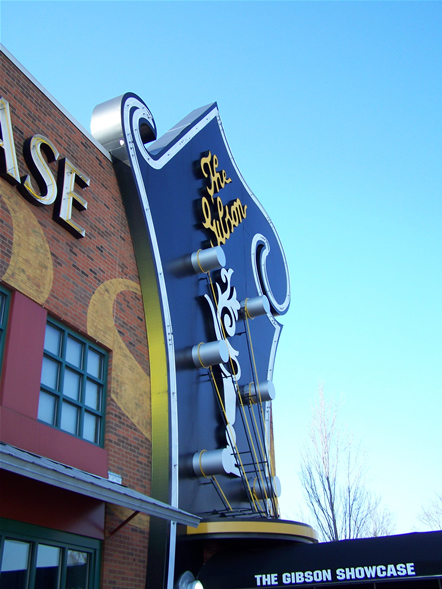
Gibson Showcase at Nashville

Between 1976 and 1984, production of Gibson guitars was shifted from Kalamazoo to Nashville, Tennessee. The Kalamazoo plant kept going for a few years as a custom-instrument shop, but was closed in 1984; several Gibson employees led by plant manager Jim Duerloo, plant superintendent Marv Lamb and J.P. Moats established Heritage Guitars in the old factory, building versions of classic Gibson designs.

=== Juszkiewicz, Berryman, and Zebrowski ===
The company was within three months of going out of business before it was bought by Henry E. Juszkiewicz, David H. Berryman, and Gary A. Zebrowski in January 1986. Gibson's wholesale shipments in 1993 were an estimated $70 million, up from $50 million in 1992. When Juszkiewicz and Berryman took over in 1986, sales were below $10 million. New production plants were opened in Memphis, Tennessee, as well as Bozeman, Montana. The Memphis facility was used for semi-hollow and custom shop instruments, while the Bozeman facility is dedicated to acoustic instruments.

Gibson purchased Garrison Guitars in 2007. In mid-2009, Gibson reduced its work force to adjust for a decline in guitar industry sales in the United States.

In 2011, Gibson acquired the Stanton Group, including Cerwin Vega, KRK Systems and Stanton DJ. Gibson then formed a new division, Gibson Pro Audio, which will deliver professional grade audio items, including headphones, loudspeakers and DJ equipment. In June 2020, Cerwin Vega Inc. acquired Cerwin Vega from Gibson. On May 21, 2021, Stanton was sold to inMusic.

Gibson announced a partnership with the Japanese-based Onkyo Corporation in 2012. Onkyo, known for audio equipment and home theater systems, became part of the Gibson Pro-Audio division. In 2013, Gibson acquired a majority stake in TEAC Corporation. In 2014, Gibson acquired the Woox consumer electronics brand from Royal Philips. In October 2017, Gibson announced plans to relocate its Memphis operations to a smaller location and plans to sell the Memphis property. Gibson opened its Memphis facility 18 years before, which occupies just a portion of a massive 127,620 square foot complex. According to the Memphis Daily News, Gibson planned to search for a new facility for its Memphis operations and would stay in the current spot for the next 18 to 24 months. The facility, which sits across from the FedExForum along South B.B. King Boulevard, was listed for $17 million.

Since its opening, the Gibson Memphis shop mostly focused on building hollow and semi-hollowbody guitars, such as the famed ES series. Presumably, this shuffling of assets was meant to address Gibson's well-publicized financial troubles.

Gibson issued a press release about the move, with former CEO Henry Juszkiewicz stating:

"We are extremely excited about this next phase of growth that we believe will benefit both our employees, and the Memphis community. I remember when our property had abandoned buildings, and Beale Street was in decline. It is with great pride that I can see the development of this area with a basketball arena, hotels, and a resurgent pride in the musical heritage of the great city of Memphis. We continue to love the Memphis community and hope to be a key contributor to its future when we move nearby to a more appropriate location for our manufacturing based business, allowing the world the benefit of our great American craftsmen."

In December 2017, the Gibson Guitar Factory building in downtown Memphis was sold for $14.1 million to Somera Road, an investment company in New York. Two years later Gibson closed the Memphis factory and moved hollow-body production to Nashville. It also moved its Nashville headquarters to Cummins Station in 2019.

In 2019, Gibson founded the Murphy Lab, a division within the Custom Shop that specializes in creating aged replicas of classic Gibson guitar models. Led by luthier and guitar restoration expert Tom Murphy, the Murphy Lab released its first collection of guitars in March 2021.

In 2021, Gibson announced that Lzzy Hale was being named the first female Gibson brand ambassador.

==== Bankruptcy ====
On May 1, 2018, the company filed for Chapter 11 bankruptcy protection. As part of its debt restructuring, the company closed and liquidated the unprofitable Gibson Innovations division, which was focused on selling audio equipment outside of the U.S., allowing Gibson to focus on its most profitable ventures, such as musical instruments. The production of Gibson and Epiphone branded guitars was not interrupted by the bankruptcy. Additionally, $135 million was provided by existing creditors to provide liquidity to maintain existing operations.

Following the restructuring, Henry Juszkiewicz stepped down as Chief Executive Officer and became a consultant to the company. On October 23, 2018, Gibson appointed James "JC" Curleigh as its new President and Chief Executive Officer as part of a new management team overseeing the company's post-bankruptcy operations. Gibson successfully emerged from Chapter 11 bankruptcy in November 2018.

=== Kohlberg Kravis Roberts ===
In July 2021, Gibson announced the launch of Gibson Records, a record label focused on releasing "guitar-centric music, across genres", with its first album being the fourth studio album from Slash feat. Myles Kennedy & The Conspirators, 4.

=== Cesar Gueikian ===
In May 2023, Cesar Gueikian, who had joined Gibson in 2018 as Chief Merchant Officer and later served as Brand President, was appointed interim President and Chief Executive Officer following the departure of James "JC" Curleigh. On July 10, 2023, Gibson's Board of Directors confirmed Gueikian as the company's permanent President and CEO.

During his tenure, Gibson continued expanding collaborations with artists, introducing new product releases across its Gibson, Epiphone, and Kramer brands, and developing initiatives including Gibson TV, Gibson Labs, and direct-to-consumer engagement. The company also continued investing in its Custom Shop, artist partnerships, and digital media activities.

In July 2026, Gibson announced that Gueikian would step down as President and Chief Executive Officer effective July 31, 2026. The company stated that he would remain a shareholder and continue serving as a member of its Board of Directors.

== Legal actions ==
=== Origin of "lawsuit guitars" ===
In 1977, Gibson sued Hoshino Gakki/Elger Guitars for copying the "open book" headstock. The lawsuit was settled out of court, and Ibanez replaced the headstock with a revised design.

In 2000, Gibson sued Fernandes Guitars in a Tokyo court for allegedly copying Gibson designs. Gibson did not prevail.

=== PRS ===
Gibson also sued PRS Guitars in 2005, to stop them from making their Singlecut model. Initially successful, the United States Court of Appeals for the Sixth Circuit reversed the lower court's decision and ordered the dismissal of Gibson's suit against PRS.

=== FWS raids & Lacey Act violation ===
Gibson's factories were raided in 2009 and 2011 by agents of the United States Fish and Wildlife Service (FWS). In November 2009, authorities found illegally imported ebony wood from Madagascar. A second raid was conducted in August 2011, during which the FWS seized wood imports from India that had been mislabeled on the US Customs declaration. Gibson Guitar Corp. filed a motion in January 2011 to recover seized materials and overturn the charges, which was denied by the court.

The United States Department of Justice found emails from 2008 and 2009 in which Gibson employees discussed the "gray market" nature of the ebony wood available from a German wood dealer—who obtained it from a supplier in Madagascar—as well as plans to obtain the wood. It filed a civil proceeding in June 2011, the first such case under the amended Lacey Act, which requires importing companies to purchase legally harvested wood and follow the environmental laws of the producing countries regardless of corruption or lack of enforcement. Gibson argued in a statement the following day that authorities were "bullying Gibson without filing charges" and denied any wrongdoing. Arguing against the federal regulations and claiming that the move threatened jobs, Republicans and Tea Party members spoke out against the raids and supported Juszkiewicz.

The case was settled on August 6, 2012, with Gibson admitting to violating the Lacey Act and agreeing to pay a fine of $300,000 in addition to a $50,000 community payment. Gibson also forfeited the wood seized in the raids, which was valued at roughly the same amount as the settlement. However, in a subsequent statement Gibson maintained its innocence with Juszkiewicz claiming that "Gibson was inappropriately targeted" and that the government raids were "so outrageous and overreaching as to deserve further Congressional investigation." Juszkiewicz continued to state, "We felt compelled to settle as the costs of proving our case at trial would have cost millions of dollars and taken a very long time to resolve."

Gibson reclaimed some wood stock that was confiscated during the raids, and produced a new series of guitar marketed to draw attention to the raids and seizures.

In the midst of the controversy, commentators stated that the raid was a politically motivated act of retaliation by the Obama administration, since Juszkiewicz had frequently donated to Republican politicians. Chris Martin IV, the CEO of Gibson competitor C. F. Martin & Company, had donated over $35,000 to the Democratic National Committee and Democratic candidates in the same time period. Martin featured several guitars in its catalog made with the same Indian wood as Gibson. The Los Angeles Times also reported in 2012: "C.F. Martin & Co. markets a line of guitars built entirely with FSC-certified wood, and others that include certified woods."

=== Paper Jamz ===
Gibson filed a lawsuit November 18, 2010, in Federal court, the Central District of California, against WowWee USA and its Paper Jamz battery-operated guitar toys, charging trademark infringement. The lawsuit claimed the Paper Jamz toy guitars copied the looks of some of Gibson's famous guitars, the Gibson Les Paul, the Gibson Flying V, the Gibson Explorer, and the Gibson SG. On December 21, 2010, Gibson was granted a request for an injunction against WowWee and retailers in the United States which were selling Paper Jamz guitars: Walmart, Amazon, Big Lots stores, Kmart Corporation, Target Corporation, Toys "R" Us, Walgreens, Brookstone, Best Buy, eBay, Toywiz.com, and Home Shopping Network The case was dismissed with prejudice (dismissed permanently) January 11, 2011 by Federal Judge R. Gary Klausner.

=== Kiesel Guitars ===
Gibson sent a cease and desist letter to Kiesel concerning two models that Kiesel makes—the ultra V and the 'California Singlecut.' According to Jeff Kiesel, Vice President of Kiesel, the letter claims that Kiesel's design infringes upon the Flying V design of Gibson.

=== Warwick/Framus ===
German manufacturer Warwick was sued by Gibson with the claim that one of the models sold under the 'Framus' brand imitated the Flying V and that customers were being misled due to this. Gibson sought a stop on the sales of these guitars and also stated that "Warwick was unfairly exploiting the reputation of the Gibson guitars." The Hamburg regional court initially ruled in favour of Gibson in 2017. However, successive judgements from the Higher Regional Court and the Federal Supreme Court in November 2020 and September 2021 dismissed Gibson's lawsuits.

=== Dean Guitars ===
Gibson sued Dean Guitars in 2019 over trademark infringement related to several guitar shapes and names. The ruling in 2022 found that the Dean V, Dean Z, and Dean Gran Sport body shapes, as well as the Dovetail headstock design and the "Hummingbird" and "Moderne" names were infringing on Gibson's designs. The judgement awarded Gibson $4,000 in damages, far short of the $7 million alleged by Gibson.

=== Trump Guitars ===
In November 2024, Gibson sent a cease-and-desist letter to Alabama-based 16 Creative, the marketers of Trump Guitars, which had recently announced a line of electric and acoustic guitars endorsed by the president. Gibson claims the guitars infringe on their trademarks, including their classic Les Paul.

== Instruments ==
Gibson also owns and makes instruments under brands such as Epiphone, Kramer, Maestro, Steinberger, and Tobias, along with the ownership of historical brands such as Kalamazoo, Dobro, Valley Arts, and Baldwin (including Chickering, Hamilton, and Wurlitzer). It also owned Slingerland Drum Company but it was sold to Drum Workshop in November 2019. Gibson relaunched Kramer Guitars at Winter NAMM 2020 on January 16. Icon, Baretta, Pacer, Focus, and SM-1 are in the original collection with the modern collection including Assault, Striker, Nite-V, and Bass. The artists collaborations for the relaunched Kramer Guitar includes Tracii Guns 'Gunstar Voyager,' the Charlie Parra 'Vanguard' and the Dave Sabo 'Snake-Baret.

Gibson has long made authorized copies of its most successful guitar designs, under the Epiphone brand name. They are less expensive than those bearing the Gibson name. A former competitor, Epiphone, was purchased by Gibson in 1957 and now makes competitively-priced Gibson-styled models, such as the Les Paul and SG, sold under the Epiphone brand, while continuing to make Epiphone-specific models like the Sheraton, Sorrento, and Casino. In Japan, Orville by Gibson once made Gibson designs sold in that country. Gibson has sought legal action against those that make and sell guitars Gibson believes are too similar to their own.

In 1977, Gibson introduced the serial numbering system in use until 2006. An eight-digit number on the back shows the date when the instrument was produced, where it was produced, and its order of production that day (e.g., first instrument stamped that day, second, etc.). An exception is the year 1994, Gibson's centennial year; many 1994 serial numbers start with "94", followed by a six-digit production number. As of 2006, the company used seven (six since 1999) serial number systems, making it difficult to identify guitars by their serial number alone. The Gibson website provides a book to help with serial number deciphering.

In 2006, Gibson introduced a nine-digit serial number system replacing the eight-digit system used since 1977, but the sixth digit now represents a batch number.

In 2003, Gibson debuted its Ethernet-based audio protocol, MaGIC, which it developed in partnership with 3Com, Advanced Micro Devices, and Xilinx. Replacing traditional analog hook-ups with a digital connection to "satisfy the unique requirements of live audio performances". This system requires a special pickup, and cabling is provided by a standard Cat-5 Ethernet cable.

Between 2008 and 2012, the company produced the Gibson ES-359, an upscaled version of the Gibson ES-339, featuring gold hardware, a multi-ply binding on the front and back of the body, and block mother of pearl inlays on the fretboard. The Gibson ES-359 closely related to the Gibson ES-335, although the body is smaller than the ES-355, closer to the size of a Les Paul model. In terms of electronics, the ES-359 uses what Gibson calls the Memphis Tone Circuit, which preserves the high frequencies as the volume is decreased.

The Gibson "self-tuning guitar", also known as a "robot model", an option on some newer Les Paul, SG, Flying V and Explorer instruments, tunes itself in about two seconds using robotics technology developed by Tronical GmbH. Under the tradename Min-ETune, this device became standard on several models in 2014.

In 2013, Gibson introduced the Government Series of Les Paul, SG, Flying V, Explorer and ES-335 guitars which were constructed solely of tonewood the US government seized but later returned to Gibson after the resolution of the company's Lacey Act violation in 2011. The guitars were finished in "government grey" and also featured decorations which intended to draw attention to the issue of government. A year later in 2014, Gibson released the Government Series II of guitars, which were essentially the same as the first series, only finished in a new color: "government tan".

In 2021, Gibson acquired the iconic electric guitar amplifier brand, Mesa Boogie.

== Factories ==
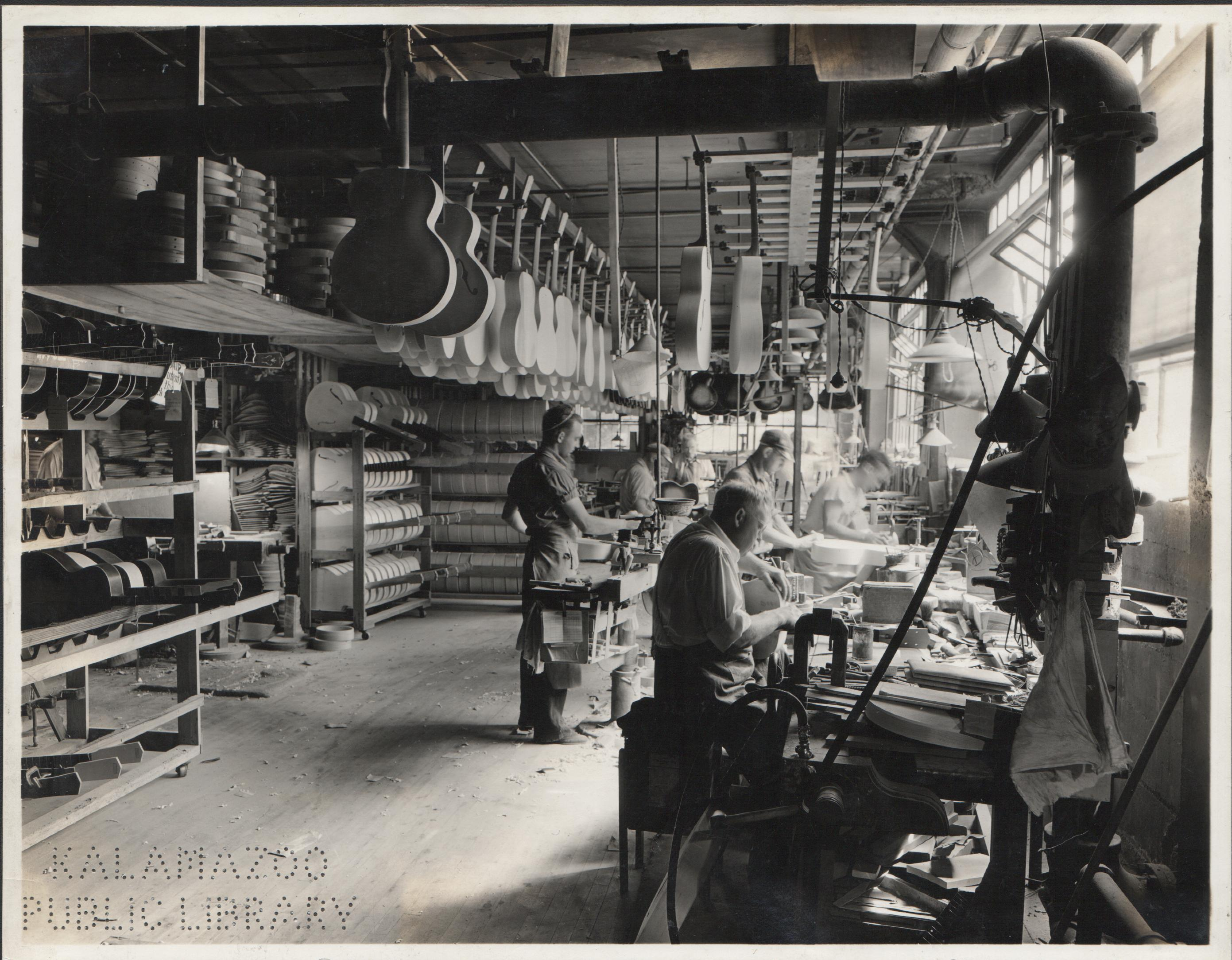
Interior of Gibson, Inc. factory on Parsons Street. 1936

All Gibson-brand guitars are currently made at two facilities, depending on the type of guitar. Electric guitars such as the Gibson Les Paul, Gibson ES-335, and the Gibson SG are made in Nashville, Tennessee. Until 2019, Semi-acoustic guitars, such as the Gibson ES Series, were made in Memphis, Tennessee, but that operation moved to Nashville during the company's restructuring as they emerged from bankruptcy protection.

Full acoustic guitars such as the Gibson J Series are made in Bozeman, Montana. In 2021–2022, Gibson expanded the Bozeman facility from 23,000 square feet (2,100 m^{2}) to 48,000 square feet (4,500 m^{2}). The new expansion will be providing 100-200 new job opportunities in the area. The Factory itself has been in Bozeman since the 1980s.

While all Gibson-branded guitars have always been built in the United States, either at these two or other prior facilities, other brands owned by the Gibson corporation may be made in other facilities, such as Epiphone-branded guitars, which are mostly built in a facility in Qingdao, China.

Below are some of the facilities used to produce Gibson instruments, along with years of their operation:

| Address | Years of Operation | Notes |
|---|---|---|
| 114 So. Burdick, Kalamazoo, MI. | 1896–1897 | This was the "business location" of "O. H. Gibson, Manufacturer, Musical Instruments." |
| 104 East Main, Kalamazoo, MI | 1899–1902 | This was Orville Gibson's residence, and he built instruments on the 2nd floor of this location. |
| 114 East Main, Kalamazoo, MI | 1902–1906 | The "Gibson Mandolin-Guitar Manufacturing Co, Ltd." was established in 1902. This building, said to be infested with cockroaches, was probably the former Witmer Bakery. |
| 114 East Exchange Place, Kalamazoo, MI | 1906–1911 | Located quite close to the previous location, in Kalamazoo's business district. |
| 521–523 East Harrison Court, Kalamazoo, MI | 1911–1917 | Located about .5 miles from previous location. The building was next to the Michigan Central Railroad, and stood for many decades, until it came down in the late 20th century. |
| 225 Parsons St, Kalamazoo, MI, 49007 | 1917–1984 | Also located next to railroad tracks, this facility had major expansions in 1945, 1950, and 1960. Various brands were produced there, including Gibson, Epiphone, (1957–1970) and Kalamazoo. During the depression of the 1930s, children's toys were produced there, and during WW2 it produced materials to support the war effort in addition to producing guitars. Between 1974 and 1984 Gibson moved its manufacturing out of this facility to Tennessee. Most of this move happened in 1974, leaving only acoustic and some semi-acoustic production for this plant. In 1985, Heritage Guitars began production, renting part of this facility. |
| 416 East Ranson, Kalamazoo, MI | 1962–? | Located six blocks south of 224 Parsons St., according to Julius Bellson's book, this building housed the Gibson Electronics Division. The building is still standing as of 2020. |
| Corner of Fulford and Alcott, Kalamazoo, MI | 1964–1970 | Located on the east side of Kalamazoo, according to Julius Bellson's book, this 60,000 sq. ft. building known as Plant 3 was the home of amplifier production, the String Division and pick-up production from 1964 to 1970. The building is still standing as of 2020. |
| 641 Massman Drive, Nashville, TN, 37210 | 1975–present | This is Gibson's facility for production of their main solid body models, such as the Les Paul and the SG. |
| 1894 Orville Way, Bozeman, MT, 59715 | 1989–present | This facility is dedicated to acoustic guitar production. |
| 145 Lt. George W. Lee Av, Memphis, TN 38103 | 2000–2018 | This was Gibson's facility for production of their semi-hollowbody electric guitars. This facility shared the same building as Gibson's Retail Shop and Beale Street "Showcase" location. |

== Gibson App ==
The Gibson App (marketed as "Gibson: Learn & Play Guitar") is a mobile guitar-learning platform developed by Swedish music-technology company Zoundio AB in collaboration with Gibson Brands. It was released in 2021 for iOS and Android devices.

=== Features ===
The app offers interactive lessons with real-time audio feedback, a library of popular songs, built-in tuner and metronome functions, and personalized progress tracking. On iOS devices, it also includes a "Digital Amp" feature that emulates amplifiers and effects without the need for external hardware.

=== History ===
The platform evolved from "Amped Guitar", an app developed by Zoundio and promoted with Gibson in 2020, before being rebranded under the Gibson name the following year.

=== Reception ===
Independent reviews have noted the platform's beginner-friendly approach, structured learning paths, and placement among contemporary online guitar-lesson services.

== See also ==
- David Harvey (luthier)
- Eden of Coronet
- Jim Triggs (luthier)
- Lloyd Loar (luthier)
- List of Gibson players
