= FWM =

FWM may refer to:

- Coventry Climax FWM, a British pump engine
- The Fabric Workshop and Museum, in Philadelphia, Pennsylvania, United States
- Fairway Market, an American grocery chain
- Four-wave mixing
- "FWM", a song by American rapper Lil Yachty from the 2018 album Lil Boat 2
- "FWM", a song by Usher from the 2016 album Hard II Love
- Several speaker systems featuring wOOx Technology
