= Gibson, Inc. Factory and Office Building =

- U.S. National Register of Historic Places
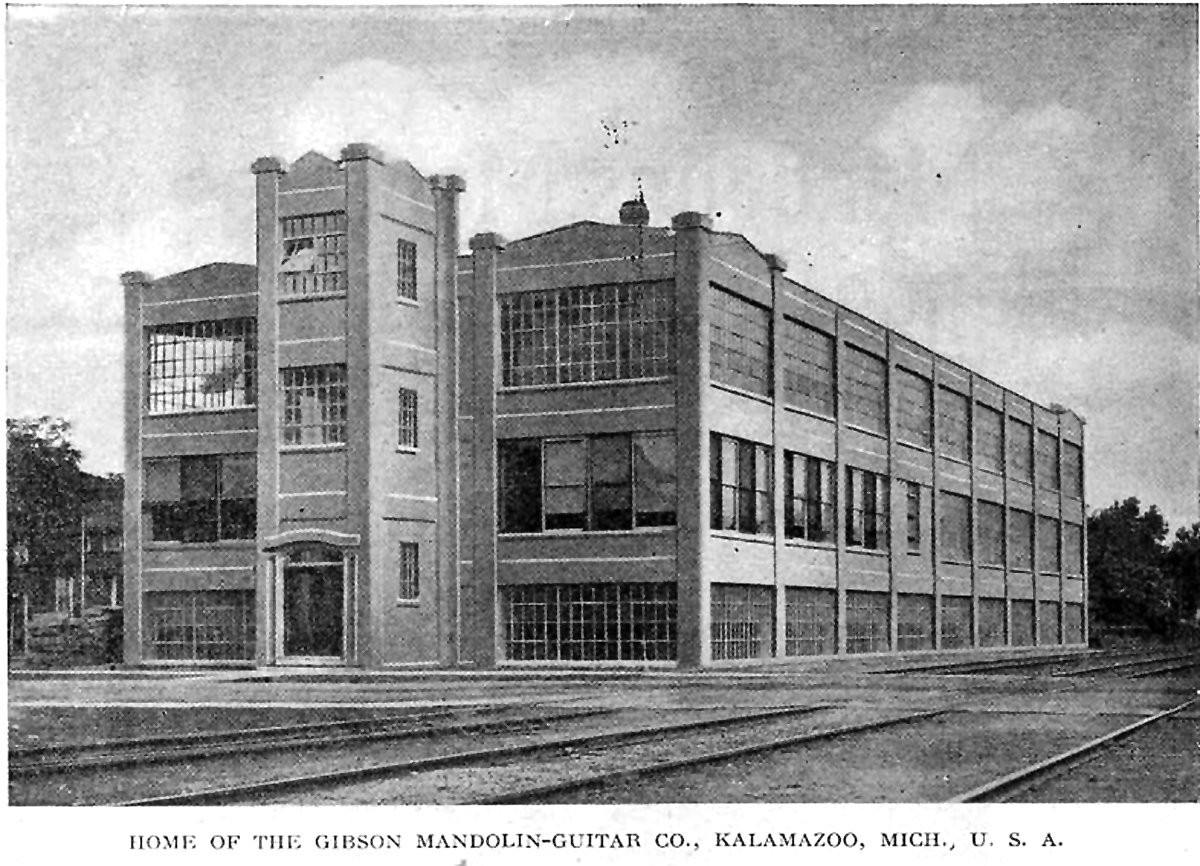
- Artist's rendering c. 1916
- Interactive map
- Location: 225 Parsons St., Kalamazoo, Michigan
- Coordinates: 42°18′4″N 85°34′51″W
- Built: 1917
- Built by: Gerard Van Eck
- Architect: George Gilbert Worden
- Architectural style: Industrial daylight style
- NRHP reference No.: 100007673
- Added to NRHP: April 29, 2022

The Gibson, Inc. Factory and Office Building is a former industrial building located at 225 Parsons Street in Kalamazoo, Michigan. It was listed on the National Register of Historic Places in 2022.

== History ==
In 1902, Orville Gibson incorporated the Gibson Mandolin Guitar Company in Kalamazoo. Production began in a former bakery located in downtown Kalamazoo. They company soon moved to a larger facility, and in 1911 moved again to a larger two-story industrial building. By this time the company employed over sixty workmen, and even the new facility was proving too small. The same year, the company purchased land on Parsons Street and hired local architect George Gilbert Worden to design a new factory and office building. However, securing permits and material was slow, and construction did not begin until 1916, with the building completed in 1917.

After World War I, interest in the mandolin declined, affecting Gibson's profits. This was exacerbated by the arrival of the Great Depression some years later. However, the company adapted and even constructed a small addition to the plant in 1935. Additional expansions were made in 1945, by the late 1940s the company was again expanding, and substantial additions to the building were made in 1950. The $400,000 brick-and-steel expansion of 1960 added an additional 60,000 square feet. In 1965, the plant was again expanded, filling the entire block. However, the market softened in the late 1960s, and in 1969 the company changed ownership.

Gibson opened a plant in Nashville, Tennessee in 1975, and over the next decade production shifted to the new plant. The Kalamazoo plant was shuttered in 1984. The 1917 building was occupied in 1985 by Heritage Guitars, a company created by former Gibson employees. They later relocated to one of the additions, and remain there as of 2021. Other small companies also use the space.

In 2021, a planned renovation of the building into a Hard Rock Hotel was announced.

== Description ==
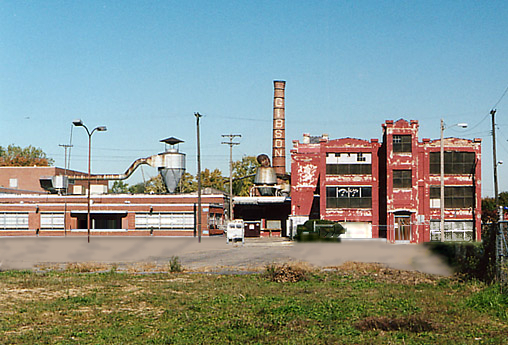
Plant in 2000

The Gibson, Inc. Factory and Office Building, consists of the original 1917 building and ten subsequent additions completed between 1917 and 1965, covering a city block. The original 1917 factory building, located in the southeast corner of the property, is a "daylight" style factory constructed of cast-in-place concrete. It is three stories tall and has a concrete and a stucco-like exterior and large steel-framed industrial windows on all sides. The remaining additions are of varied styles, most being single-story steel structures with masonry exteriors. A Modern Movement office building was added in the 1950s.
