= Relic'ing =

Artificial aging process for electric guitars

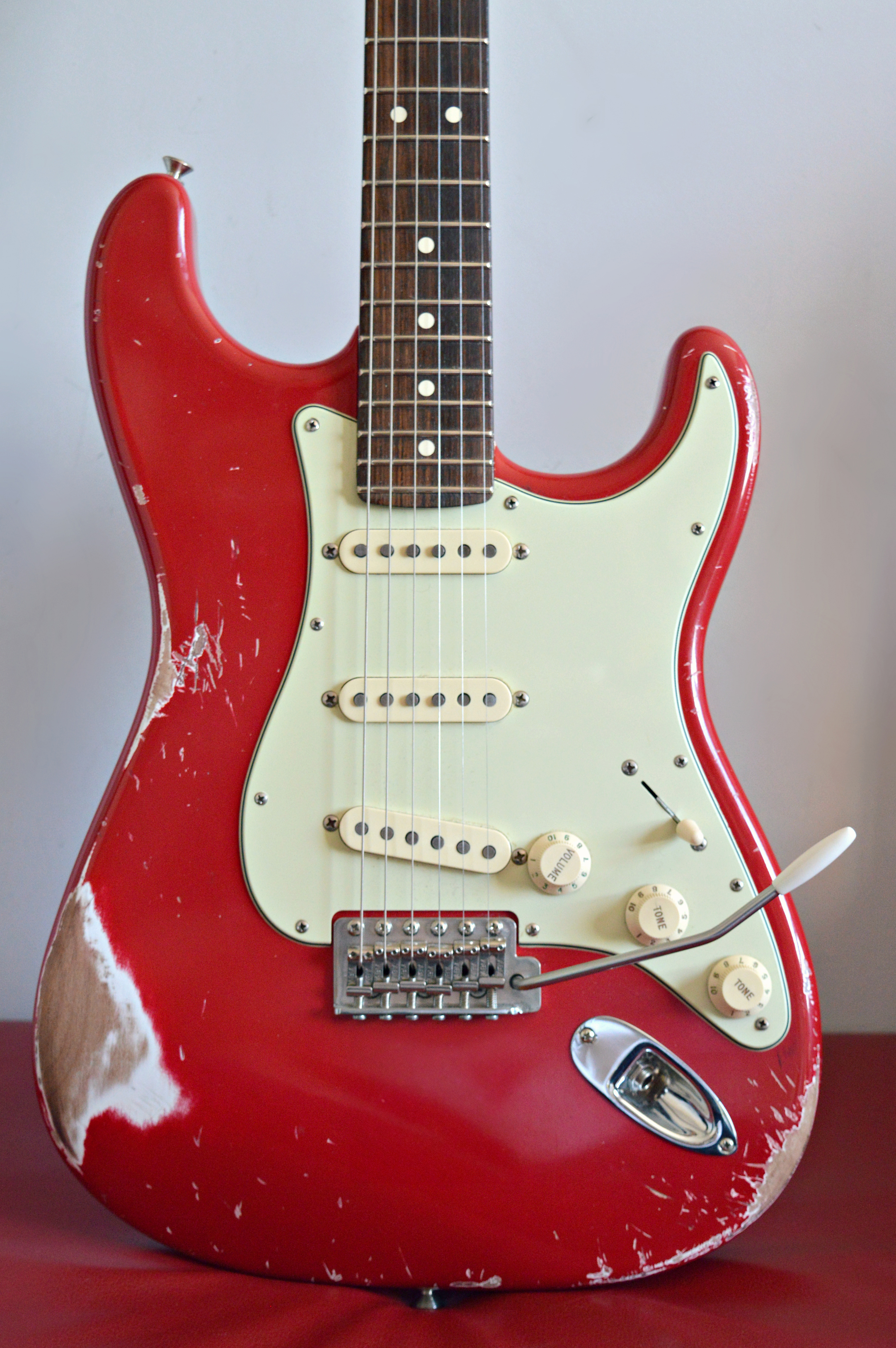
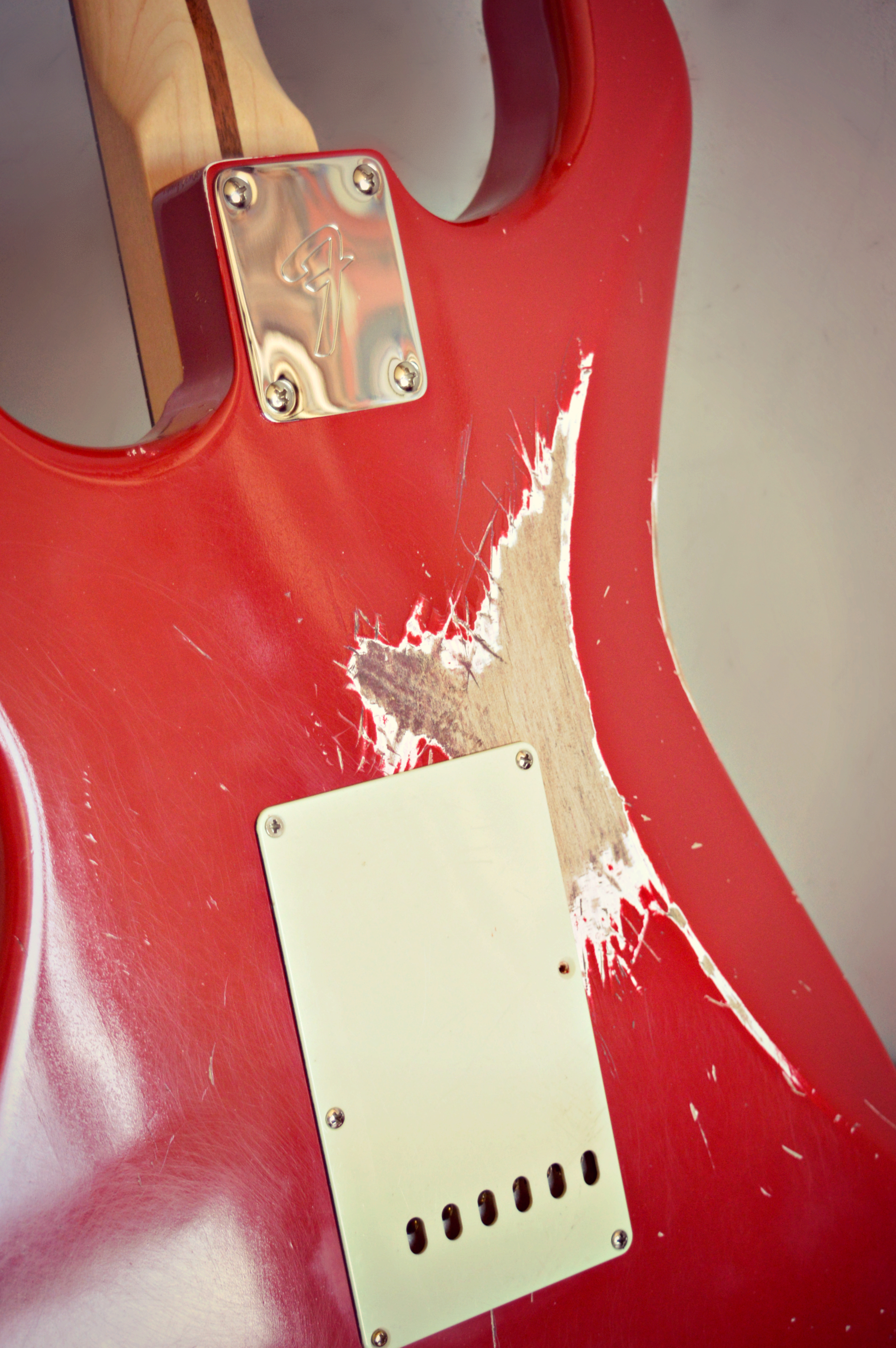
A Fender Stratocaster with relic'ing

Relic'ing (also written as relicing) is the process of distressing a guitar to mimic the worn appearance and broken-in feel of an older, vintage model. Relic'ing is done to both new guitars by their manufacturer, typically as "aged" replicas of models from sought-after years, and to used guitars by their owners as a popular DIY project. Types of wear emulated can include faded or worn finishes, tarnished hardware, and scrapes, dents, and stains. There is no established methodology to intentionally aging a guitar. The process can include tools as varied as sandpaper, steel wool, bathroom cleaner, coffee, razor blades, hair dryers, and car keys, among other things.

== Purpose ==
Relic'ing is performed with the goal of creating a worn, aged appearance and feel in newer guitars. Over time, guitars change due to various factors, such as exposure to the elements, temperature changes, and sweat, resulting in paint colors fading, cellulose finishes taking on a patina, and hardware becoming tarnished. Friction from contact with a player's body can also wear away paint, sometimes exposing the underlying wood, while the player's hands traveling up and down the neck can thin the finish and "roll" the fretboard edges, resulting in a smoother feel. Relic'ing seeks to replicate many of these effects.

Tom Murphy of Gibson's Custom Shop theorized the popularity of relic'd guitars is due to the increasing scarcity and high prices of vintage guitars, while Guitar World wrote that they are an attractive alternative to getting the look and feel of vintage guitars without the risk of being sold an expensive guitar of questionable authenticity. Gibson has also noted that while relic'ing is largely superficial, there can nonetheless be a psychoacoustic effect, with relic'ing providing a "vibe and character" that affects how players hear the guitar.

=== Criticism ===
For many vintage guitar enthusiasts, the visible wear-and-tear of a guitar having been played for decades creates in it a prestige that relic'ing cannot capture. Relic'ing, they say, is inherently aesthetic, and critics have equated it to buying pre-ripped jeans. Premier Guitar likewise noted that there is a "sincerity" to a guitar naturally coming by its blemishes and highlighted the irony of guitarists going to great lengths to fake an authentically worn look through purely inauthentic means. One luthier in a Guitar World article said purchasing relic'd guitars was an example of players "hear[ing] with their eyes." Music Radar, however, noted that while the aged appearance of relic'd guitars is what detractors of the practice typically focus on, the "broken-in" feel of these guitars is often their primary attraction for buyers. Guitar World later argued that relic'ing had "gone too far", as manufacturers were increasingly imitating unrealistically severe amounts of wear and tear; the piece noted that most vintage instruments are prized and well-cared-for by their owners and thus typically exhibit only light to moderate effects of aging.

== History ==
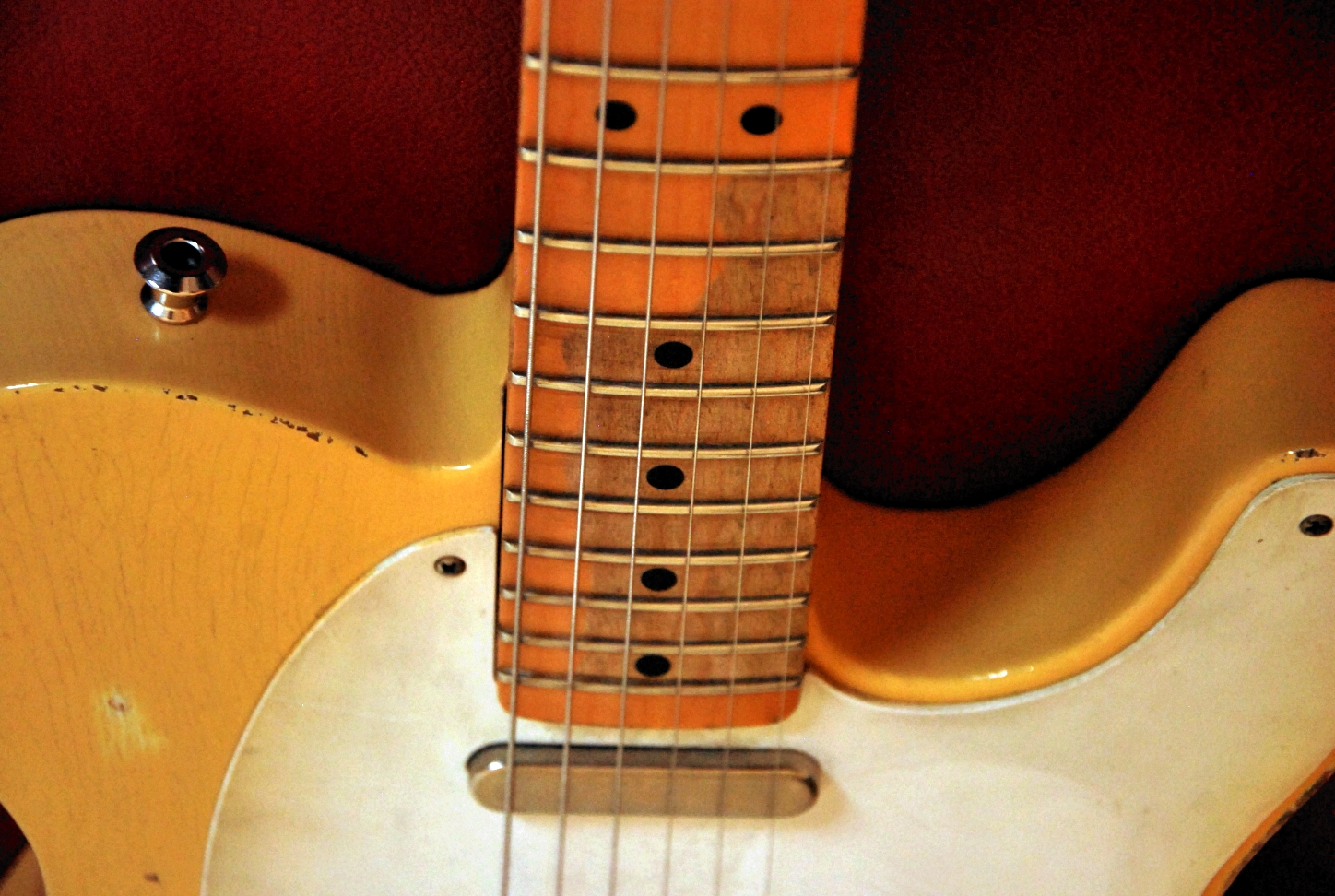
Close-up of a Fender "Road Worn" series '52 Telecaster reissue.

Adrian Belew suggested he had owned the first relic'd guitar—a brown sunburst Fender Stratocaster—while in Frank Zappa's band in the 1970s. Dismayed by its unsightly finish, Belew turned the guitar over to his friend Seymour Duncan, who proceeded to "age" the guitar through methods such as rubbing motor oil into the neck, dragging it across a lawn, and lighting it on fire. Similarly, Julian Lage recalled aging a Telecaster when he was younger—"before relic'ing was a thing"—via means like working nail polish remover into the frets and throwing the guitar against a curb.

In the 1980s, relic'ing began gaining traction in repair shops. Luthiers realized it looked unappealing to replace worn or broken parts with new ones on older guitars and began aging replacement parts for a consistent look. One such luthier, Tom Murphy, predicted aging entire guitars would become a trend and began exploring such techniques himself. Although his early work was "crude and primitive," other luthiers were impressed by the results when Murphy displayed his aged guitars at trade shows and demand for relic'd instruments started growing.

Fender began developing the idea of relic'ing guitars as part of the production process in 1989 after J.W. Black, a builder in the company's Custom Shop, saw an aged Strat a friend had made and showed it to his boss, John Page. Black suggested producing a "Relic" line of guitars from the Custom Shop and Page agreed. One of the first relic'd instruments the Custom Shop produced was a "beat up" bass for Keith Richards, who gifted it to Don Was after Was had mused over why armoires could be antiqued but guitars could not. For the 1995 NAMM show, Fender made two 1950s-era relic'd models, a "Nocaster" and a blonde-bodied "Mary Kaye" Strat. The guitars initially fooled attendees, who thought the guitars were original. Enthusiasm over the concept led to high demand from the Custom Shop, which began producing their "Relic" line with a Nocaster and '50s and '60s-era Strat models, and then later a '60s Jazz Bass. Fender has since expanded their relic'ing into multiple guitar lines with each varying the amount of simulated wear.

Beginning in the early '90s, Gibson's own fledgling Custom Shop sought to produce its most period-accurate recreation of the 1958-1960 "Burst" Les Paul Standard. Multiple changes to earlier reissue models were implemented at the behest of Murphy, an early Custom Shop employee, resulting in the brand's "Historic Les Paul" model in 1993. Murphy left Gibson the following year to set up a vintage guitar restoration company where he established himself as a pioneer in relic'ing. In 1999, Gibson collaborated with Murphy on a "Tom Murphy Aged" line of guitars, with Murphy altering each guitar by hand at his shop. These guitars became regarded as Gibson's top-of-the-line instruments. Gibson's Custom Shop later took over the relic'ing process and produced its first in-house aged model, Eric Clapton's signature ES-335, in 2005. Since 2006, Gibson has marketed their aged finishes as "Vintage Original Spec" (VOS). Gibson often uses VOS finishes for reissues and signature models based on older guitars, such as Billy Gibbons' "Pearly Gates" 1959 Les Paul and Chuck Berry's 1955 ES-350T. In 2019, Gibson founded the Murphy Lab, a division within the Custom Shop in which Murphy and a small team of luthiers conduct the brand's relic'ing work. The Murphy Lab released its first collection of aged electric guitars two years later, and then in 2023 brought relic'ing to the brand's acoustic guitars.

Many luthiers offer relicing guitars as a service.

== Techniques ==
There is no single established method for relic'ing or aging a guitar, and many luthiers maintain their methods as a trade secret. Most relic'ing is done by hand, resulting in each guitar being unique. Luthiers use tools as varied as sandpaper, steel wool, bathroom cleaner, coffee, razor blades, and hair dryers, among other things. Tom Murphy of Gibson's Custom Shop often relies on atypical items, such as old car keys and even a railroad spike, the latter for altering the texture on the back of guitar necks. Common techniques include extensive exposure to sunlight to fade paint colors and subjecting the guitar to sharp temperature changes to create cracks in the cellulose finish, which can also be mimicked with razor blades. Aging hardware like the bridge and pickup covers can be accomplished by brushing them with steel wool or placing them in boxes with hard items like nails and shaking the box.

Relic'ing is considered a difficult process to do convincingly. In a multi-part DIY guide, Premier Guitar noted that many guitarists "overdo" relic'ing, in large part because they often have little to no experience with actual vintage guitars and are thus not familiar with the nuances of an older guitar's condition. Murphy likewise described many early relic'ing techniques as "low-tech brutality" that could easily "get a little out of hand." Guitar World noted however that techniques have since become more advanced, with tools like cooling chambers and special lacquer formulations, and described modern relic'ing as "where art collides with science."
