= Tom Murphy (luthier) =

American luthier

Tom Murphy (born 1950) is an American luthier known for his pioneering work in guitar relic'ing and his association with the brand Gibson.

== Biography ==
A native of Marion, Illinois, Murphy's desire to be a professional musician took him to Houston and Austin, and eventually Nashville, where he found work as a guitarist in touring bands for Sawyer Brown and Marie Osmond. After this, he turned his attention to building guitars.

In the late '80s and '90s, Murphy helped establish Gibson's Nashville-based Custom Shop, where he worked on improving the authenticity of the brand's reissue guitar models. Murphy eventually left to establish his own vintage guitar restoration company, Guitar Preservation , where he further developed techniques in "ageing" guitars. In 1999, Murphy began collaborating with Gibson, providing the relic'ing for their reissue guitar models in his own shop. His work played a pivotal role in legitimizing the controversial practice of relic'ing guitars, and his guitars became widely regarded among guitarists as Gibson's highest-end offerings.

In 2019, Gibson and Murphy founded The Murphy Lab, a division within the Custom Shop in which Murphy and a team of luthiers handle the brand's relic'ing process. Upon the release of the Murphy Lab's first collection of guitars, Guitar World dubbed the offerings the "pinnacle" of guitar ageing and the closest a new guitar can get to a vintage look and feel. Gibson's brand president stated that naming the lab after Murphy was a tribute to him, for how Murphy's work helped to reestablish Gibson's reputation among players, placing him among pivotal figures in Gibson's history like Ted McCarty and Seth Lover. In 2023, Gibson released a 1959 Les Paul Standard reissue produced by the Murphy Lab, dubbed by the company Murphy's "magnum opus," with each of its six new finishes named after Murphy.
