= Garrison Guitars =

Canadian guitar manufacturing company

- Type: Private (1999–2007); Subsidiary (2007–10)
- Industry: Musical instruments
- Founded: 1999; 27 years ago
- Founder: Chris Griffiths
- Fate: Acquired by Gibson in 2007; Closed in 2010; 16 years ago
- Headquarters: St. John's, Newfoundland and Labrador
- Area served: Worldwide
- Products: Electric and acoustic guitars
- Parent: Gibson (2007–10)

Garrison Guitars was a guitar manufacturing company originally founded by Chris Griffiths in Canada in 1999. The company became a subsidiary of Gibson in 2007, and its factory in St. John's was closed in 2010. During its existence, Garrison manufactured electric and acoustic guitars, as well as all-solid wood mandolins and mandolas.

== History ==
Chris Griffiths established the company in St. John's, the capital city of the province of Newfoundland and Labrador, in 1999. In early 2001, the company opened a 20,000 square foot factory tooled with the latest robotics, laser cutting, CNC milling, and UV finishing for producing its electric and acoustic guitar models and all-solid wood mandolins and mandolas for distribution in North America, Australia, United Kingdom, Norway, Germany, the Netherlands, Spain, China, Japan and Canada.

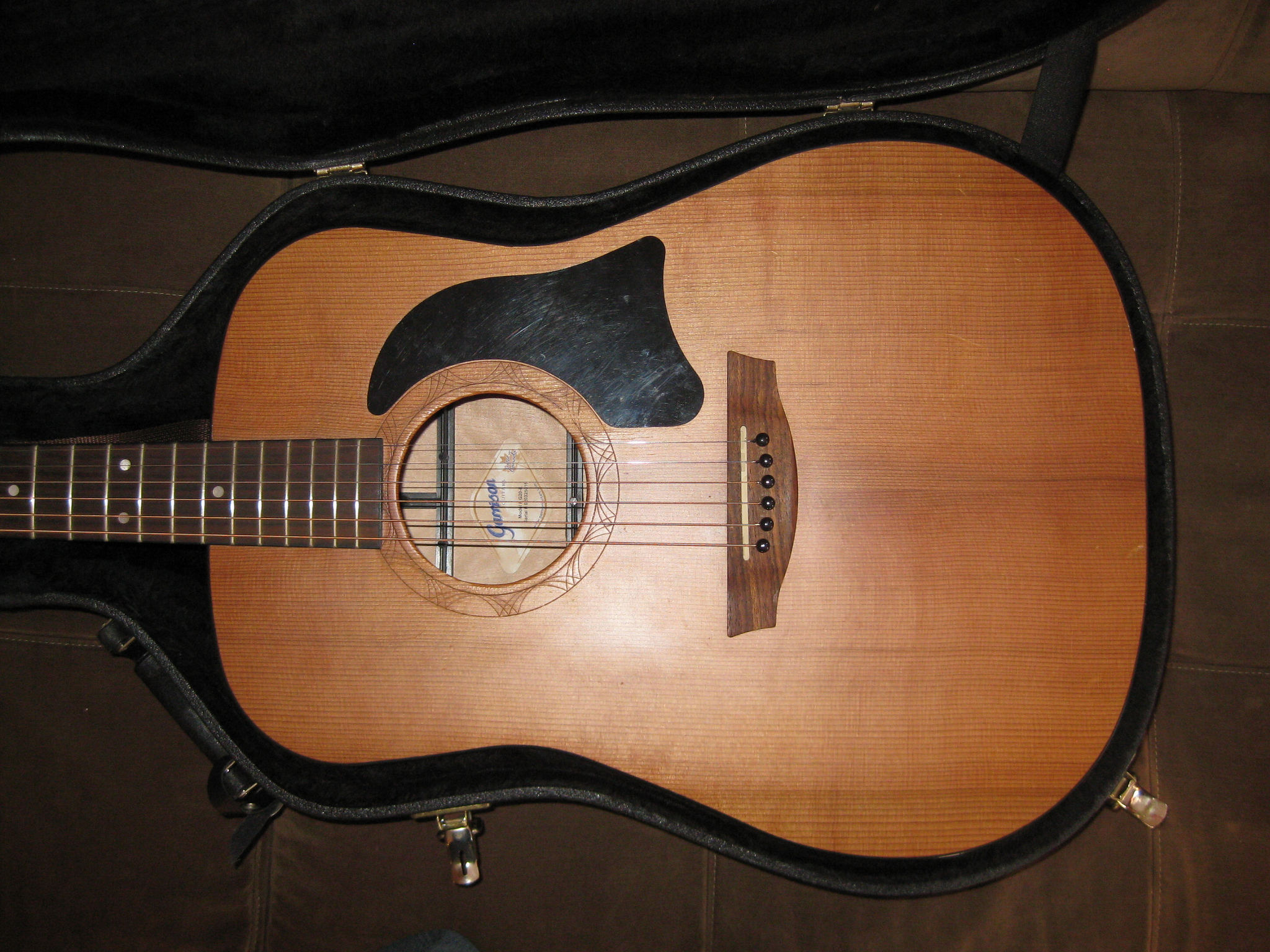
G20-E acoustic model

Garrison Guitars and its founder won awards for innovation, business planning, export growth, leadership and entrepreneurship. Garrison Guitars was awarded a "Golden Axe Award" for Best Value by Harmony Central in 2000. Founder Chris Griffiths was also awarded the Manning Innovation Award in 2003.

Garrison Guitars were crafted using innovations including the Griffiths Active Bracing System (GABS), a revolutionary method of guitar construction that took over six years to perfect. The single unit brace combined all the acoustic guitar's top braces into a single unit to allow for resonance to have an uninterrupted path of travel throughout the instrument and provided enhanced structural stability.

Offering a range of instruments at all price points, Garrison's G series featured all solid woods, hard-shell cases, bolt-on necks, and UV-finishes in a variety of wood combinations. G series guitars also included the full GABS combining front and back braces, kerfing, and neck and end blocks. The AG series was an affordable line using the patented bracing system technology only for the top, with more traditional back/side bracing and kerfing. Garrison manufactured the G series in Canada, while the AG series were designed in Canada and manufactured in China.

On July 3, 2007, Gibson Guitar Corporation announced its acquisition of Garrison Guitars. The acquisition was to "further Gibson's expansion in the acoustic guitar market offering a new series of Gibson brand acoustic guitars aimed at the median price point" by converting the Garrison factory to produce Gibson's Songmaker series of acoustic guitars. Gibson did not carry forward with the GABS in their Songmaker series, and ended production around 2010, closing down the former Garrison factory in Canada.
