= Digital Sound System 80 =

The Digital Sound System 80, short DSS80, was a three-piece PC audio system co-developed by Microsoft and Philips. It debuted at the 1998 Electronic Entertainment Expo (E³) and is most likely the only speaker system ever released by the Microsoft Corporation. It also remains one of the very few featuring Philips' wOOx subwoofer technology.

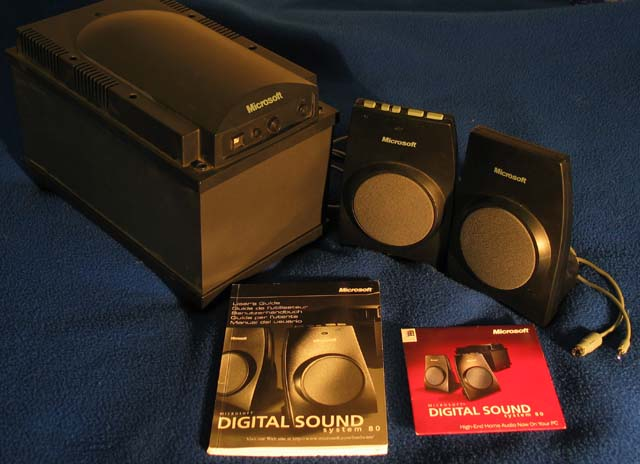
The DSS80 speaker system

The DSS80 featured technological innovations in comparison with contemporary systems. For instance, it didn't require a sound card installed but actually featured its own integrated sound hardware which could be connected via USB and allowed digital quality playback, synchronized hardware and software volume controls, the use of a 10-band graphic equalizer and Microsoft Surround Sound.

To support computers without USB, and to enable users to take advantage of present high-end sound hardware, it additionally featured 3.5mm analog line-in.

It was possible to connect the system both ways to ensure highest compatibility with both analog and digital audio content.

== Technical specifications ==
- System type: Biamplified, stereophonic speakers and dual voice coil subwoofer
- Amplification: High efficiency, class-D switch-mode power amplifier
- Rated power output (per IEC 268.3):
  - Subwoofer: 44 W
  - Left/Right Speakers: 32 W, 16 W per speaker
- Frequency response: 40 Hz to 20,000 Hz
- Transducers:
  - Subwoofer: 5.25" Dual voice coil active woofer, 6" wOOx passive radiator
  - Left/Right Speakers: 3" full range, magnetically shielded
- Power supply (subwoofer only): AC 110-220 V, 50–60 Hz, 310 mA @ 220 V
- Electronic crossover frequency (subwoofer to a speaker): 160 Hz
- Electronic crossover filter slopes:
  - Subwoofer: -18 dB/octave at 160 Hz
  - Left/Right Speakers: +12 dB/octave at 160 Hz
- Digital input sensitivity: Full Scale minus 12 dB
- Analog input sensitivity: 0.180 V rms for rated output power
- Analog input impedance: > 10 kΩ

== Control Speaker Cable Wiring information ==
Plug pattern

The plug on the Microsoft DSS80 control satellite speaker ( right speaker ) is a Mini-DIN 4 plug. It is a proprietary connector.

To say the connector is ADB (Apple Desktop Bus) is incorrect; any ADB device plugged into this port would not operate and likewise if the DSS80 were plugged into an Apple ADB port it would not function. Therefore, the only similarity is the Mini-DIN 4 connector type.

The pins on the DSS80 plug are connected to the following wires: with the index mark (labeled "B") at 12 o'clock, the pin at 2 o'clock connects to the black wire (speaker ground); the pin at 4 o'clock connects to the red wire (speaker hot); the pin at 8 o'clock connects to the yellow wire; the pin at 10 o'clock connects to the blue wire; and the ground sheath connects to the white wire. If you bypass the plug and wire the cable directly to the subwoofer, remember to mirror these connections.

The subwoofer and satellite speaker are both held together with Torx #10 screws.

== Controls and indicators ==
On top of the Right speaker are the manual controls of the DSS80. There are five pushbutton controls:

Mute on/off
Bass -
Bass +
Volume -
Volume +

There is also one indicator on the Right speaker. It shows Green when the unit is operational, Amber on stand-by and flashing Green/Amber when muted.

== Volume control issue ==
The DSS80 was afflicted with a glitch concerning the main volume control. At times, when one of the buttons was held down, the volume would quickly increase to the maximum, or decrease to the minimum setting. The only way to stop this process was to hit the mute button. These issues seem to be resolved when connected to Windows Vista and Windows 7.
