= Heritage Guitars =

American musical instruments manufacturer company

Coordinates: 42.3017302°N 85.5808211°W

Heritage Guitar

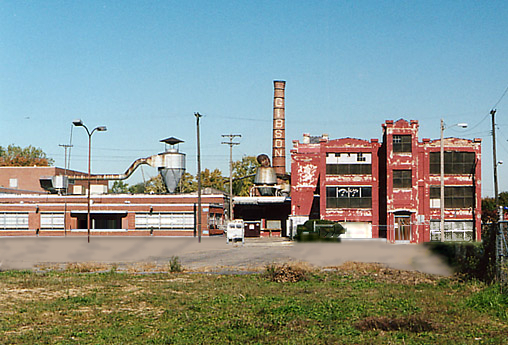
- Heritage Guitar Inc. photographed in 2000
- Industry: Musical instruments
- Founded: 1985; 41 years ago
- Founder: Jim Deurloo, Marv Lamb, and JP Moats
- Headquarters: Kalamazoo, Michigan, United States
- Products: Electric guitars
- Parent: BandLab Technologies
- Website: heritageguitars.com

Heritage Guitar is an American musical instrument manufacturer company based in Kalamazoo, Michigan, United States. The company produces a range of electric guitars, including hollow-body models.

== History ==
Heritage Guitar was founded in 1985 by three former employees of the Gibson factory, Jim Deurloo, Marv Lamb, and JP Moats. Two other former Gibson employees that took part in the company were Bill Paige and Mike Korpak.

In the early 1980s, Gibson closed its historic Parsons Street factory in Kalamazoo due to excess production, and relocated much of its production to its factory in Nashville, Tennessee. Some of the Gibson employees who did not move to Tennessee started production of guitars under a new name, "Heritage," which was likely meant to stake a claim to their guitar-making tradition. The company produced instruments in much smaller numbers than Gibson had.

The Heritage line initially consisted of electric and acoustic guitars, electric basses, mandolins, and a banjo. The line was eventually narrowed to electric guitars only. Although most of Heritage's guitars were based on Gibson designs, a few of their early guitars were based on other designs.

In 2024, Heritage launched a new budget line known as the Ascent Collection. These instruments are made in China with more affordable woods, finishes, and electronics. They also lean heavily into bolt-on neck construction, features not typically associated with the Heritage lineup.

== Current status ==
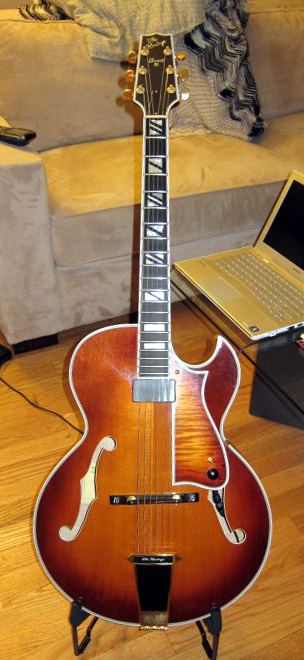
Archtop full-hollowbody

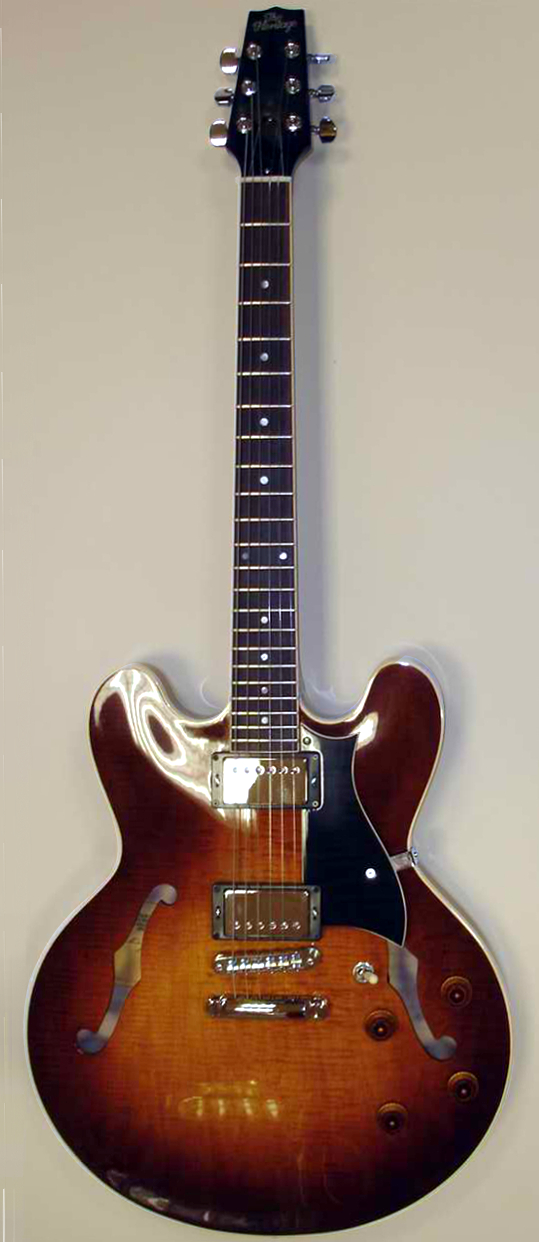
H-535 semi-hollowbody

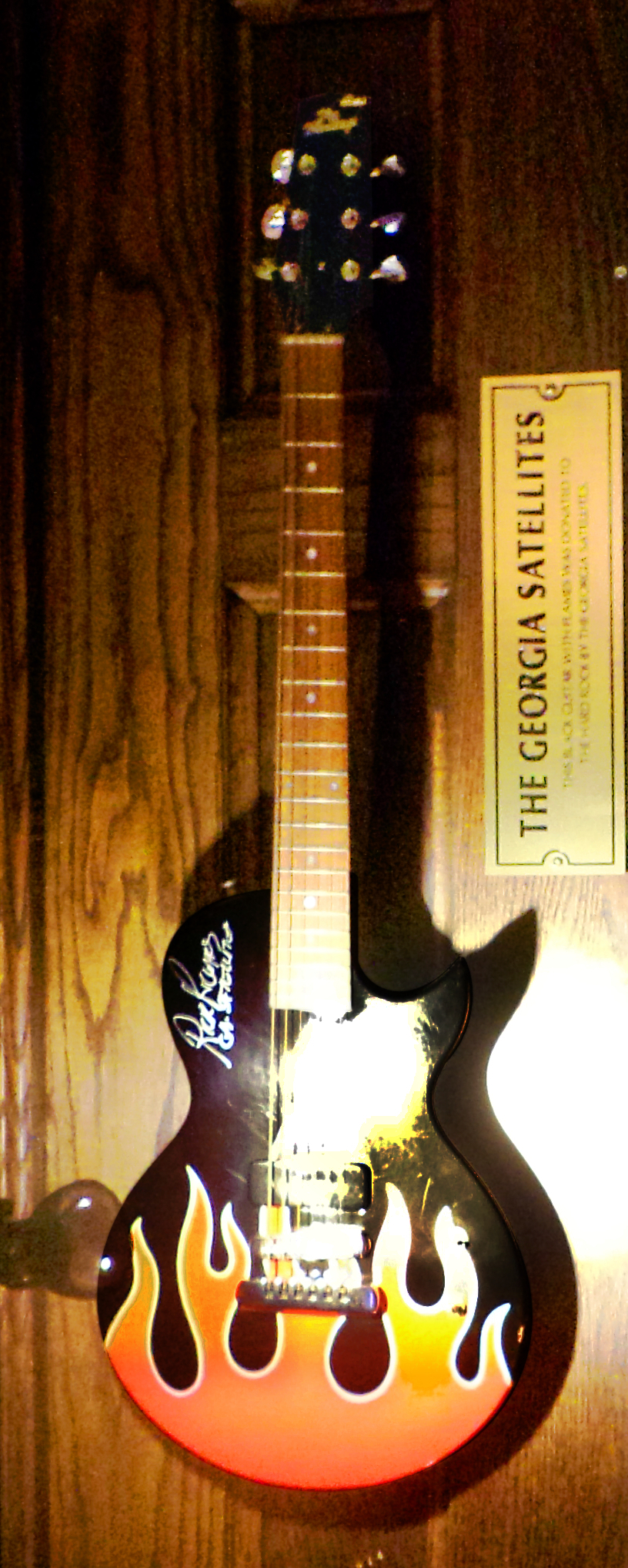
Electric

Heritage Guitars is a boutique manufacturer, making semi-hollow guitars, large jazz boxes, and solid-body electrics. Heritage guitars are said to be similar to vintage Gibson products, which the company's advocates and fans say were constructed in a much more "handmade" fashion and with more attention to detail.

The design of the Heritage H-150 solid-body guitar is modelled on the Les Paul Standard, while the H-575 resembles the ES-175 and the H-535 reinterprets the ES-335. All Heritage full-body semi-acoustics have solid wood tops, while many of the Gibson guitars of this type had laminated tops after World War II. Heritage has also introduced several new designs, such as the Millennium models, which employ a "semi-solid" chambered body that is more solid than a traditional semi-hollow design.

During the first several years of the company, Heritage advertised its guitars in guitar magazines. The marketing was handled by the former VP of Sales at Gibson, Lane Zastrow. The advertisements wrote that Heritage was making guitars on Parsons Street in Kalamazoo, without mentioning Gibson by name. In the 1990s, in an attempt to keep costs down, the company stopped advertising.

In 2016, Heritage was purchased from the founders by PlazaCorp Realty Advisors Inc., a Kalamazoo-based property development firm that had recently purchased the property housing the factory. In 2017, PlazaCorp partnered with Singapore-based tech startup BandLab Technologies to revamp marketing and distribution of the brand worldwide. Additionally, they partnered with Rolling Stone to develop the factory campus into a destination to include "a live entertainment venue, a music instrument store, a recording studio and a space for musicians to try instruments or rehearse." That same year, BandLab acquired a majority stake in the company. The following year, CNC machinery was installed and craftspeople were terminated in order to lower overhead costs.

== Endorsers ==
=== Johnny Smith ===
In 1989, jazz guitarist Johnny Smith withdrew his endorsement from Gibson and awarded it to Heritage, which began production of "Heritage Johnny Smith". The Gibson model continued in production as the "Gibson LeGrand". Smith had since moved his endorsement from Heritage to the Guild Guitar Company.

=== Alex Skolnick ===
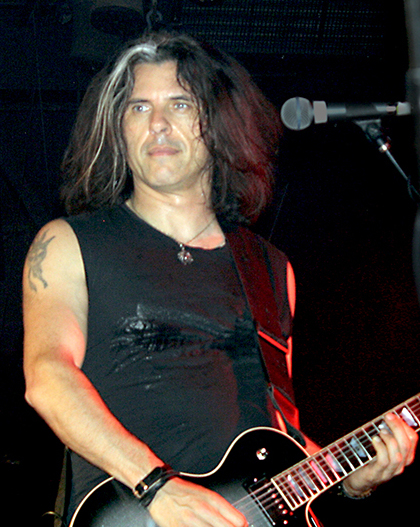
Alex Skolnick playing his signature H-150

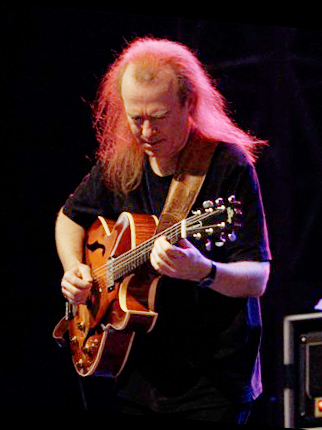
David Becker playing a H-575

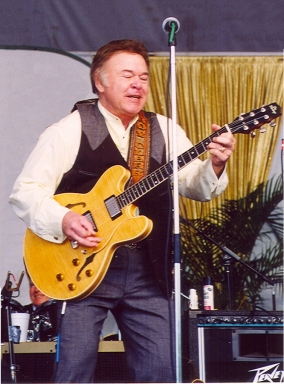
Roy Clark playing a H-535

Guitarist Alex Skolnick, of the band Testament, formerly endorsed Heritage Guitar. For a short time, the Heritage Guitar company offered an "Alex Skolnick signature model H-150". In 2013, Skolnick announced his endorsement of ESP Guitars. Skolnick is now an endorser of Godin Jazz guitars.

=== David Becker ===
Jazz guitarist, composer, and two-time Grammy nominee David Becker has been endorsing Heritage Guitar for more than 30 years. He was one of the first artists to join Heritage in 1988. The "David Becker H-575 Signature Model" features a solid spruce top, maple sides and back, and a humbucker and piezo pickup.

=== Others ===
Jazz guitarist, producer, and composer Henry Johnson was the second endorser of Heritage Guitar, beginning in 1985. Country musician Roy Clark endorsed Heritage Guitar, which make his signature model. Jazz guitarist Mimi Fox's guitars are a "Golden Eagle" and an H-575 custom with a spruce top. American jazz guitarist Kenny Burrell plays a "Heritage Super KB" hollow body through a "Heritage 1 x 12 Kenny Burrell" combo amp.

Irish rock and blues guitarist Gary Moore had a limited edition "Heritage Gary Moore" model between 1989 and 1992, limited to 150 instruments. It features prominently on the cover of his After The War album.
