= WOOx Technology =

Type of loudspeaker

wOOx Technology (rendered wOOx) is a brand created by Philips to identify loudspeaker systems that employ passive radiator technology along with active equalisation to maximize the output of the passive diaphragm. wOOx Technology optimizes the active bass driver, the passive bass radiator, and the active equalisation curve to obtain maximum low-frequency reproduction in a relatively compact configuration.

Developed by Philips, is designed to enhance bass reproduction in audio systems, providing richer and deeper sound. It achieves this through a combination of advanced speaker design and digital signal processing to deliver an improved listening experience.

== The wOOx Bass Radiator ==
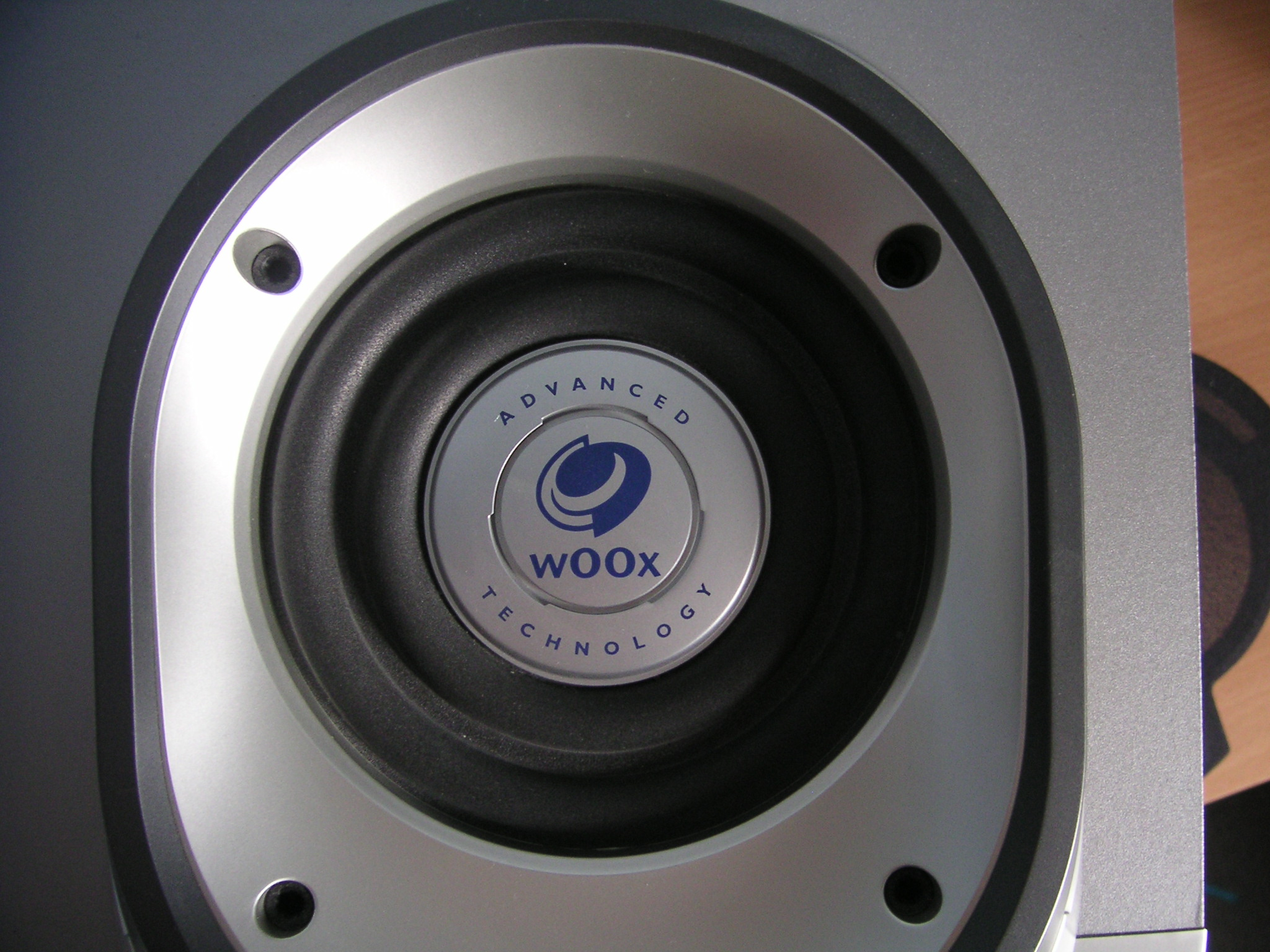
Passive radiator with wOOx Technology

The primary element of a wOOx Technology speaker system is the bass radiator. The wOOx bass radiator (referred to in marketing literature as the wOOx-Slave) is functionally indistinguishable from the typical "passive radiator" diaphragms previously employed in loudspeaker systems. Early wOOx radiators used a patented design with two foam-rubber suspension rings instead of the typical single ring, and a symmetrical sandwich construction.

Typical passive radiator theory dictates that the passive radiator should be capable of displacing at least twice the volume of air that the active driver displaces through its own stroke. To satisfy this requirement, passive radiators traditionally have a larger surface area than the active driver. The dual-suspension design of the wOOx bass radiator allows the radiator to undergo extreme excursions, so the wOOx radiator displaces the necessary air volume without being larger than the active driver, enabling easier integration into consumer electronics products. More recent embodiments of the wOOx bass radiator use a single-roll suspension.

The wOOx radiator incorporates a mass element in the center of its diaphragm, which is used to adjust the tuning frequency of the loudspeaker enclosure. In this sense, a loudspeaker enclosure with passive radiators emulates a mass-spring system, much like the Helmholtz resonator devices (bass reflex ports) more commonly used to tune loudspeaker enclosures. However, the amount of mass suspended on a passive radiator diaphragm enables extremely deep tuning frequencies to be possible in small enclosures. However, like any passive radiator system, it is possible to damage the bass radiator by driving it beyond its mechanical limits. To avoid this, some wOOx systems use an additional reflex vent, having the same tuning as the wOOx radiator. This relieves excess pressure that could tear the bass radiator apart.

== Design of the Active Driver ==
In a loudspeaker system incorporating passive diaphragms, the term 'active driver' refers to the loudspeaker driver with the voice coil, to distinguish it from the 'passive' diaphragms which have no voice coil. In loudspeaker systems that rely on resonant augmentation of the output of the active driver (these include bass-reflex systems, passive radiator systems, bandpass systems, and transmission-line systems), the resonant system absorbs the acoustic load from the active loudspeaker driver, decreasing the necessary cone excursion to achieve high output at low frequencies. However, it is advantageous to have a loudspeaker driver with a strong magnetic structure for high electrical damping of the driver cone. This supplies the maximum possible force to the loudspeaker cone and creates the maximum possible excitation of the resonant system.

The same is true for systems that use wOOx technology, in which the wOOx radiator absorbs the acoustic load from the active driver. Because the wOOx radiator is capable of greater excursion than the active driver without increasing distortion, it is desirable to excite the wOOx radiator as much as possible, to keep the excursion of the active driver at a minimum while maximizing the output of the loudspeaker system. Thus it is desirable to employ a more powerful magnetic structure. To protect the moving structure of the active driver from potential over excursion, the driver is designed with a higher degree of mechanical excursion capability.

== Active equalization ==
One benefit of the wOOx bass radiator (and passive radiators in general) when compared to the more common bass-reflex vents is that there is no possibility of air turbulence noise if the resonant system is greatly excited. As a result, additional equalization applied near the enclosure tuning frequency can increase system output without generating extraneous noises or greatly increasing cone excursion of the active driver. Many wOOx-equipped mini-stereo systems produced by Philips feature a three-level equalization control which applies additional bass equalization at frequencies which excite the wOOx bass radiator, improving the visceral 'impact' of the bass through the wOOx radiator's extreme air displacement capability. This use of active equalization to increase overall system output is the primary characteristic that differentiates wOOx technology from typical loudspeaker systems equipped with passive radiators.

== Products with wOOx ==
In addition to Philips' own use of wOOx Technology, the technology also appeared in products sold by Kenwood and Microsoft. Also, some Philips products display "wOOx²" branding, though apparently without a fundamental change to the wOOx system. The only likely difference between wOOx and wOOx² is in the amount of active equalization applied to the system.

A common marketing slogan used by Philips for products with wOOx Technology is "Hear the bass, feel the difference".

This is a list of products which feature wOOx Technology, though it is not exhaustive. Not all of these products were sold in the U.S. market.

Executive and Shelf Systems

- FW-P88
- FWC700
- FWC717
- FWC780
- FWC785
- FWV795
- FWC798
- FWC80
- FWC85
- FWC870
- FWi1000
- FWM70
- FWM75
- FWM730
- FWM777
- FWM779
- FWM922
- FWR55
- FWR88
- MC70
- MC77
- MC80

Home Theater Systems

- MX1015D
- MX1060D
- MX3700D
- LX700
- LX8000SA
- LX8200SA
- LX8300SA

Portable Music Systems

- AZ2555 CD Soundmachine
- AZ2558 CD Soundmachine

Televisions

- PF9630
- PF9731
- PFL7603
- PFK5709

Products From Other Manufacturers

- Microsoft Digital Sound System 80
- Kenwood KSC-WA62RC Powered Automotive Subwoofer
- Kenwood NV 301 Executive System
- Volvo Loudspeaker kit HT-540/640 (for Volvo V40)
- Volvo Loudspeaker kit HT-V41 (for Volvo V40)

Other Products

- SPA8210/37 Multimedia Speakers
- MMS305 PC speaker system
- MMS306 PC speaker system
- AJ300D iPod/GoGear Docking Clock Radio
