= Henri Selmer Paris =

French manufacturer of musical instruments

Henri SELMER Paris
- Company type: Private
- Industry: Musical instruments
- Founded: 1885; 141 years ago
- Founder: Henri Selmer
- Headquarters: Mantes-la-Ville, France
- Area served: Worldwide
- Key people: Thierry Oriez
- Products: Woodwind instruments: saxophones, clarinets and mouthpieces
- Number of employees: 450+ (2019)
- Website: Official website

Henri Selmer Paris is a French enterprise, manufacturer of musical instruments based at Mantes-la-Ville near Paris. Founded in 1885, it is known as a producer of professional-grade woodwind and brass instruments, especially saxophones, clarinets and trumpets. Henri Selmer Paris was family-owned until 2018, when it was sold to Argos-Wityu.

Selmer Paris saxophones have been played by many well-known artists such as Marcel Mule, Claude Delangle, Frederick Hemke, Charlie Parker, John Coltrane, Paul Desmond, Herschel Evans, Zoot Sims, Michael Brecker, Sonny Rollins, Ornette Coleman and Coleman Hawkins. Benny Goodman played a Selmer clarinet early in his career.

== History ==
=== Selmer Paris ===
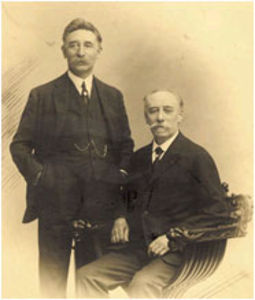
Henri & Alexandre Selmer

In the late nineteenth century, brothers Alexandre and Henri Selmer graduated from the Paris Conservatory as clarinetists. They were the great-grandchildren of French military drum major Johannes Jacobus Zelmer, grandchildren of Jean-Jacques Selmer, the Army Chief of Music, and two of 16 siblings. At the time, musical instruments and accessories were primarily hand made, and professional musicians found it necessary to acquire skills allowing them to make their own accessories and repair and modify their own instruments. Establishing Henri Selmer & Cie. in 1885, Henri began making clarinet reeds and mouthpieces.

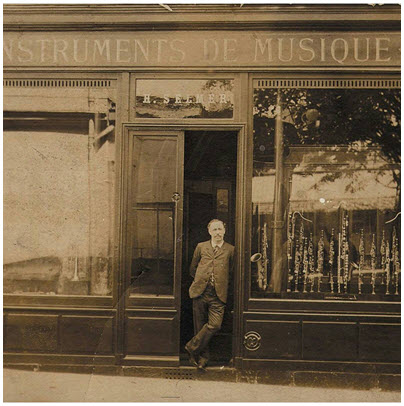
Selmer repair shop, 4 Place Dancourt, Paris, c. 1900

In 1898 Selmer opened a store and repair shop in Paris and started producing clarinets. Selmer presented clarinets at the 1904 Louisiana Purchase Exposition world's fair in Saint Louis, winning a gold medal. Alexandre Selmer established himself in New York in 1909, opening a shop that sold Selmer clarinets and mouthpieces. The H. & A. Selmer (USA) Company, originally a retail partnership between the two brothers, was incorporated to expand with H. Selmer & Cie retaining a minority interest in 1923. In 1927 H. Selmer & Cie sold their remaining stake to American partner George Bundy, and the American branch went on to acquire Vincent Bach Corporation and eventually C.G. Conn to become Conn-Selmer.

=== Selmer UK ===
A semi-independent branch of Selmer for the United Kingdom was created in 1928 under the leadership of two brothers, Ben and Lew Davis. They concentrated primarily on licensing, importing and distribution rather than manufacturing, and by 1939 had grown to become the largest company in the British musical instrument industry.

In 1935 Selmer UK began producing sound reinforcement systems under the Selmer name. They expanded their manufacturing facilities by purchasing another P.A. company called RSA in 1946. By 1951 they were manufacturing electric organs and in 1955 they gained the exclusive licensing rights to make Lowrey organs and Leslie organ speakers for the UK. They were also the primary importers and distributors for Höfner guitars, a well-known German guitar company, from the early 1950s through the early 1970s. In 1967, Höfner actually produced a small range of semi-acoustic and acoustic guitars for Selmer UK These were badged with the Selmer logo and most had a Selmer "lyre" tailpiece. Model names were the Astra, Emperor, Diplomat, Triumph and Arizona Jumbo.

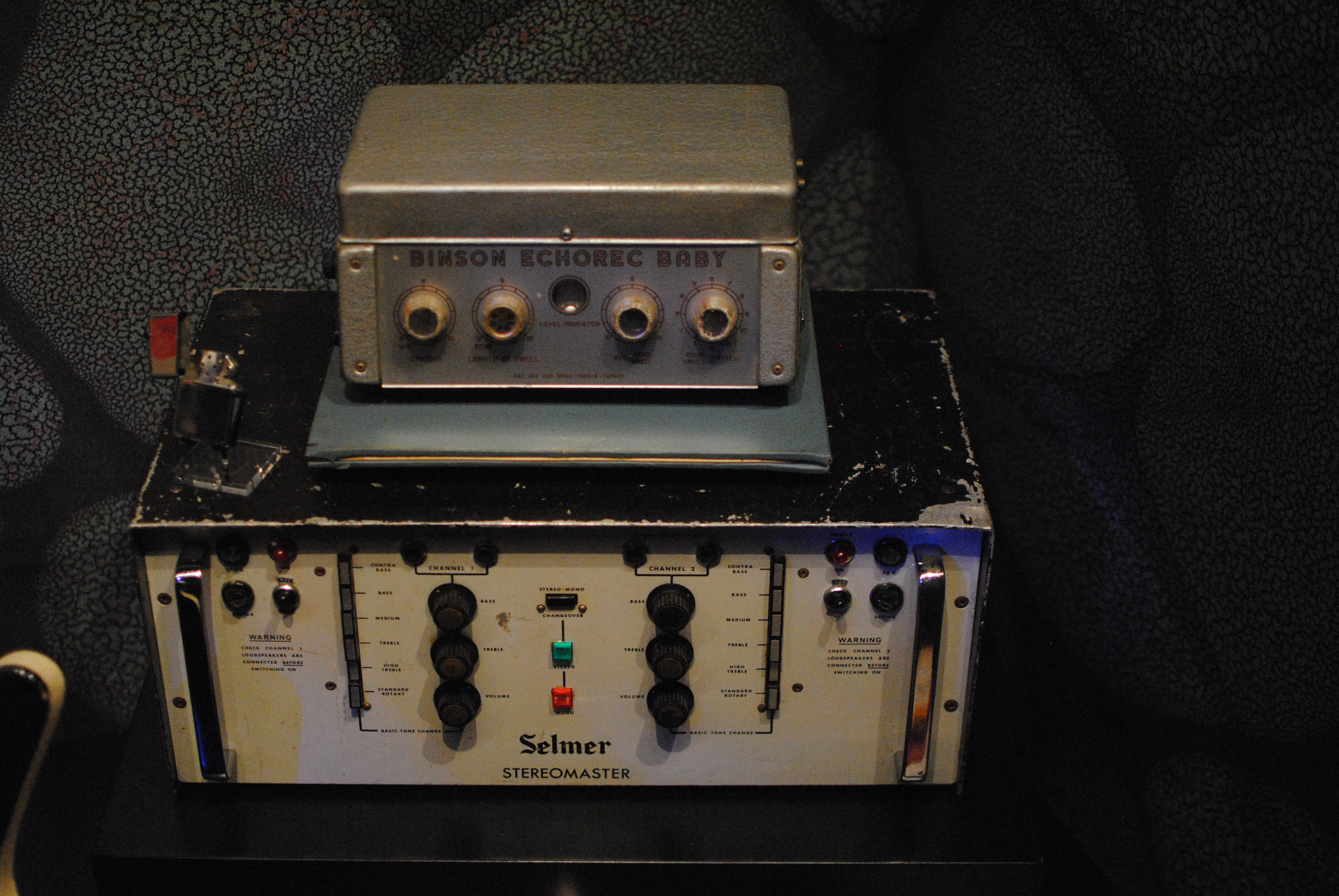
Selmer amplifier

With the growth of skiffle music and the arrival of rock and roll in the mid-1950s, Selmer UK began producing guitar and bass amplifiers. In the early 1960s, despite Selmer's apparent market domination, The Shadows' and The Beatles' endorsement of Vox amplifiers relegated Selmer guitar amplifiers to a distant second place in sales. The management of the company made various lukewarm attempts to gain endorsement from aspiring musicians but became increasingly distant from the developments in pop culture from the mid-1960s considering that its role was to support "real" or established professional musicians and not the headliners of the pop industry. This was the beginning of the end for Selmer UK.

By the early 1970s Selmer UK had been purchased by Chicago Musical Instruments, then the parent company of Los Angeles brass instrument manufacturer F.E. Olds and Gibson Guitars, which Selmer was distributing in the UK. By this time Marshall guitar amplifiers had cornered the market, and the Selmer manufacturing facility was an expensive drain on resources. During this period, the Selmer range of Treble & Bass 50 & 100 valve amplifiers appeared to be stylistic relics from pre-1959 and the decision was made to move the manufacturing facility to a disused brush and coconut matting works dating from 1914, based in rural Essex. The factory which purchased from Music and Plastic Industries. This was a disaster, coupled as it was to an uninspiring reworking of the Selmer range of speaker cabinets and the introduction of a poorly designed range of solid state power amplifiers.

After being passed around several other owners, Selmer once again found itself owned by the Gibson Guitar parent company, this time through a holding company called Norlin Music USA. The marketing policy adopted by management involved allowing its distributors to arrange short-term loans of Gibson instruments on a trial basis. This was considered an excellent marketing ploy had it been controlled but the reality of the situation was that instrument loans were made freely available to any musician and bands who made a request. The consequences were that these very expensive musical instruments were used, damaged, and returned unsold to the UK warehouse, where attempts were made to repair them with the limited facilities on hand, as the distribution agreement with the manufacturing base in Kalamazoo, Michigan, did not allow for the return of defective items. At one time in 1977 there were over one thousand damaged, broken and disassembled Gibson guitars stored in an unheated warehouse in Braintree, Essex.

The factory in Braintree also developed the manufacturing of Lowrey keyboards from KD kits exported from the Chicago manufacturing base of CMI. These instruments were technically advanced but the build quality was poor compared with keyboards which were just beginning to reach the UK and European markets from Japan. To supplement earnings the company made the decision to import a low cost Italian designed organ marketed as a Selmer product which was distributed in large numbers by catalogue sales. Again the return rate, this time due to damage in transit, was significant. In spite of a rebranding as Norlin Music (UK) the management of the company failed to address the key factors preferring to effect a range of cost-cutting measures. In 1976 Norlin Music Inc., faced with mounting debts, began dismantling Selmer UK piece by piece, until the only facility was a repair center for Lowrey organs with a single employee. This shut down in the early 1980s.

Despite being largely unknown in the U.S., Selmer guitar amplifiers from the early 1960s have begun to gain a reputation as vintage collectibles among valve amplifier enthusiasts.

=== Selmer saxophones ===
Selmer began creating saxophones in 1922, which became known as the Model 22. The saxophone was a popular choice, as Selmer created the "Balanced action", which was a prototype for modern saxophones, many saxophones today have many of the components from this formation. The bore and bell were bigger than the American saxophone, become direct competition with them as a compatible option. The Selmer Tenor Saxophone became a popular choice in Europe for jazz musicians. George Cassidy, a Northern Irish jazz musician, had become a favourite with the Selmer tenor saxophone, for its warm, rich and expressive tone. Cassidy inspired Van Morrison, his Hyndford Street neighbour to take music lessons from him based on his performances with the Selmer tenor saxophone.

=== Selmer guitars ===
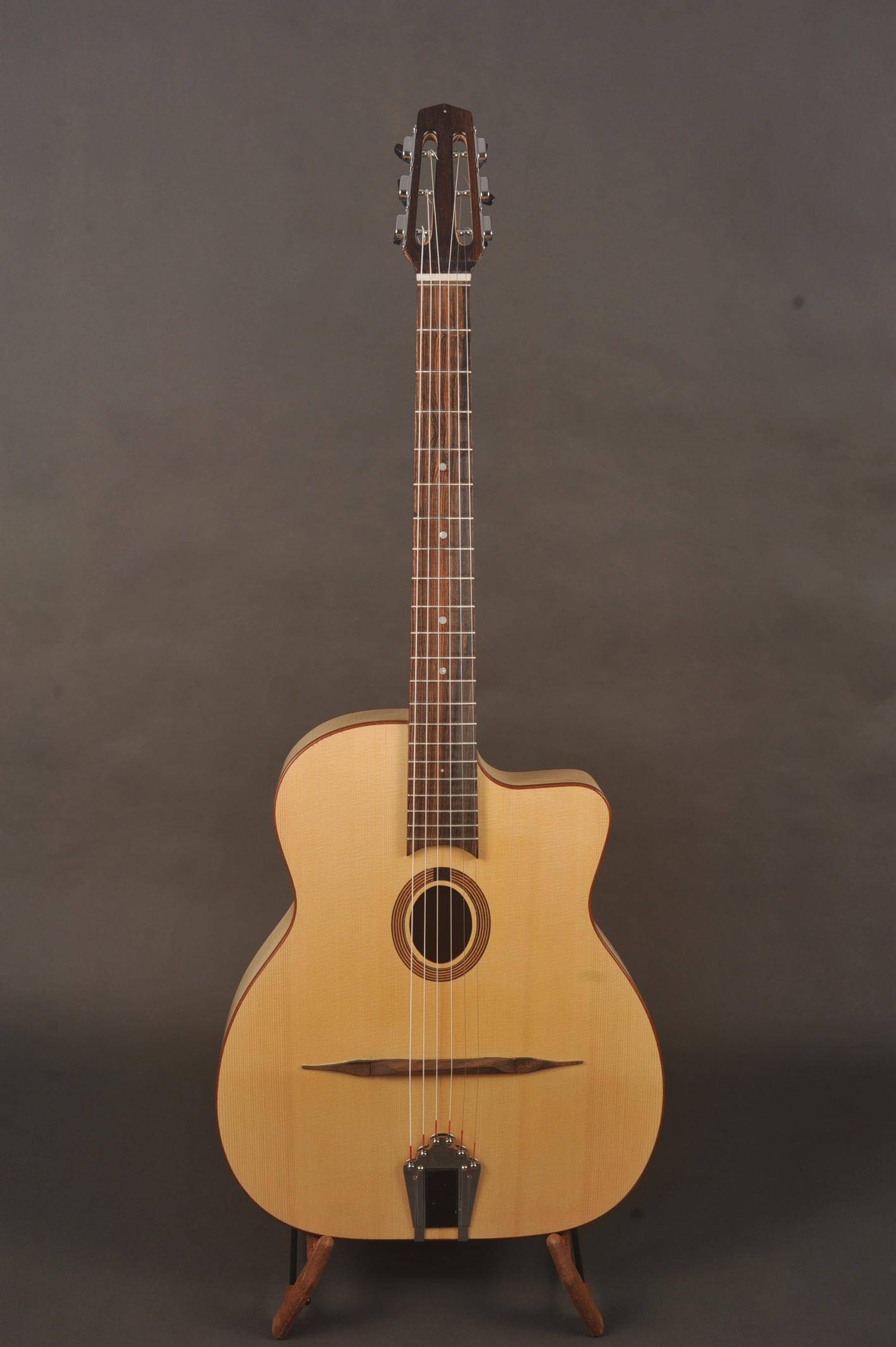
Selmer Maccaferri guitar

In 1932 Selmer partnered with the Italian guitarist and luthier Mario Maccaferri to produce a line of acoustic guitars based on Maccaferri's unorthodox design. Although Maccaferri's association with Selmer ended in 1934, the company continued to make several models of this guitar until 1952. The guitar was closely associated with famed jazz guitarist Django Reinhardt. (See also Selmer-Maccaferri Guitar and Hostetter, Paul (2018). "Is it a Maccaferri? Or is it a Selmer?". Lutherie.net.)

== Historical list of Selmer instruments ==
=== Saxophones—Paris ===
- Modèle 22 (1922–1925)
- Modèle 26 (1926–1929)
- Modèle 28 (1928–1929)
- Selmer Adolphe Sax (1929–1935)
- New Largebore (1929)
- Super "Cigar Cutter" (1930–1932)
- Super (1932–1933)
- Radio Improved (Super) (1934–1938)
- Jimmy Dorsey Model (Super) (1935–1938)
- Balanced Action (1936–1947)
- Super Action (1948–1953)
- Mark VI (1954–1975 for alto and tenor, 1954–1980 for all other types of sax)
- Mark VII (1974–1980)
- Super Action 80 (1980–1985)
- Super Action 80 Serie II (1985-)
- Serie III (1994-)
- Reference 54 / Reference 36 (2000-)
- Edition Limitée (2014–2015)
- Axos (2015-)
- Supreme (2021-)
- Signature (2023-)

=== Clarinets—Paris ===
- no model name, often called "Breveté" (1900s, 1910s and 1920s)
- no model name, often called "Déposé" (1930s, 1940s, 1950s, 1960s, and 1970s) These are often differentiated by the letter at the beginning of the serial number and referred to as "K-series", "L-series", "M-series" or "N-series". A "Déposé" from the N-series will have characteristics very different from those of one from the K-series. The Breveté mark and the Déposé mark were never meant to describe or label the clarinet; they are just French terms meaning, roughly, "certified" and "registered", respectively.
- Radio Improved or RI (ca. 1931–1934) the K series of serial numbers after K7000
- Balanced Tone or BT (ca. 1935–1953) the L, M and N series (both with and without the *BT* emblem on the top and bottom joint)
- Master Model (metal clarinet) (1927 – c. 1939)
- 55 (ca. 1939) One year only *(M serial numbers, 1st appears in 1940 Selmer brochure, 15.00 mm bore, large toneholes, Tone Control Chamber register vent, Transition to Centered Tone)
- Centered Tone (c. 1954 – 1960) large-bore clarinets. Serial# N, O, P, Q cylindrical bore 15.00 mm/15.10 mm. Serial# R & S slightly reduced bore 14.90 mm reverse-taper design
- Series 9 (1960s, 1970s and 1980s) large-bore clarinets (14.90 mm bore with Reverse Taper bore design)
- Series 9* (1960s) with undercut tone holes and reducing bore diameter. *(Undercut tone holes only in upper joint. Bore measurement 14.65 mm)
- Series 10 (1970s—cylindrical bore) *(undercut tone holes throughout both joints, small reverse-taper bore measurement 14.52 mm)
- Series 10G (1970s and 1980s {and 1990s?}) Designed by Anthony Gigliotti. In the December 1999 issue of The Clarinet, Gigliotti wrote: "The first time I went to the Buffet Crampon factory in France was in 1953 and I remember trying 55 Bb clarinets. After selecting the two best ones I then spent countless hours with Hans Moennig tuning and voicing them until I could finally try them in the orchestra. My reason for becoming involved with the Selmer Company was to make it possible for a student or professional to buy an instrument that didn't need all that work and it has resulted in the series 10G which was based on my Moennigized Buffet which I played for 27 years." (Not an exact copy of Buffet acoustically: smaller bore size, more undercutting to tone holes, tone hole placement different, with Moennig's reverse-taper barrel standard with 10G. 1st generation 10G 14.52 mm bore, 2nd generation 10G 14.60 mm bore. Selmer Paris only clarinet with "poly-cylindrical bore) Series 10G poly-cylindrical bore versus regular Series 10 & Series 10S/10SII reverse-taper bore
- Series 10S (1970s and 1980s (and 1990s?))
- Series 10S II (1970s and 1980s (and 1990s?)) Smaller bore than 10S.
- Recital (1980s–20**) *(very small revere taper bore 14.35 mm, extra thick bore walls produces dark sound)
- Odyssée
- Arthea
- Prologue I and II
- St. Louis
- Signature
- Artys
- Privilège

Selmer Paris sold less-expensive clarinets under the names Barbier, Bundy (Paris) and Raymond until ca. 1935, after which they focused exclusively on professional clarinets.

Note: Selmer Paris harmony clarinets (sizes other than B♭ and A soprano clarinet) are mostly called by their model number rather than a name, but there are, for example, RI bass clarinets and Series 9 alto and bass clarinets.

=== Guitars ===
- Maltiao
- X8J
- Series 666
- Signet series, ended in 1970
- Futurama

=== Brass instruments ===
==== Trumpets ====
- Armstrong/Balanced (1933)
- K-Modified (1954)
- Deville (1962)
- Radial 2˚ (1968)
- Series 700 (1977)
- Chorus
- Concept
- Sigma

Additional images and information can be found here.

==== Trombones ====
- Special
- K-Modified
- Bolero (1962)
- Largo (1962)

=== Other instruments ===
- Piano accordion
- Invicta
- Invicta lugano
- English Horn (Cor Anglais)- Selmer Paris

== See also ==
- Conn-Selmer, the American firm
