= Gibson Southern Jumbo =

Model of acoustic guitar

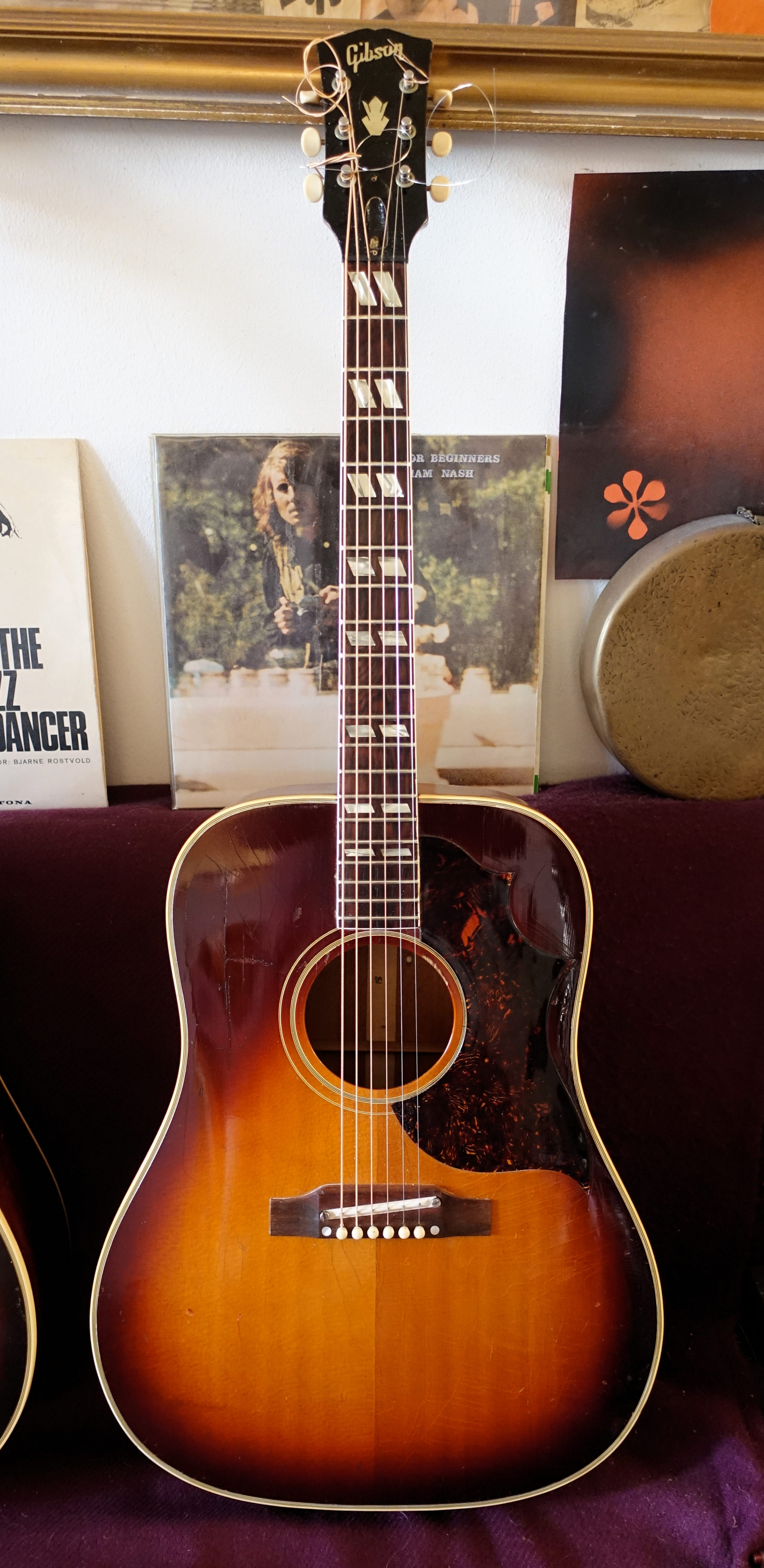
A rare 11/16 nut width 1966 version

The Gibson Southern Jumbo is a flat-top acoustic guitar model originally manufactured by the Gibson Guitar Corporation between 1942 and 1978. For the first 20 years of its manufacture it was a round-shouldered instrument, which changed to square-shouldered in 1962. Several modern reissues have been created by Gibson, based on the round-shouldered version.

== History ==
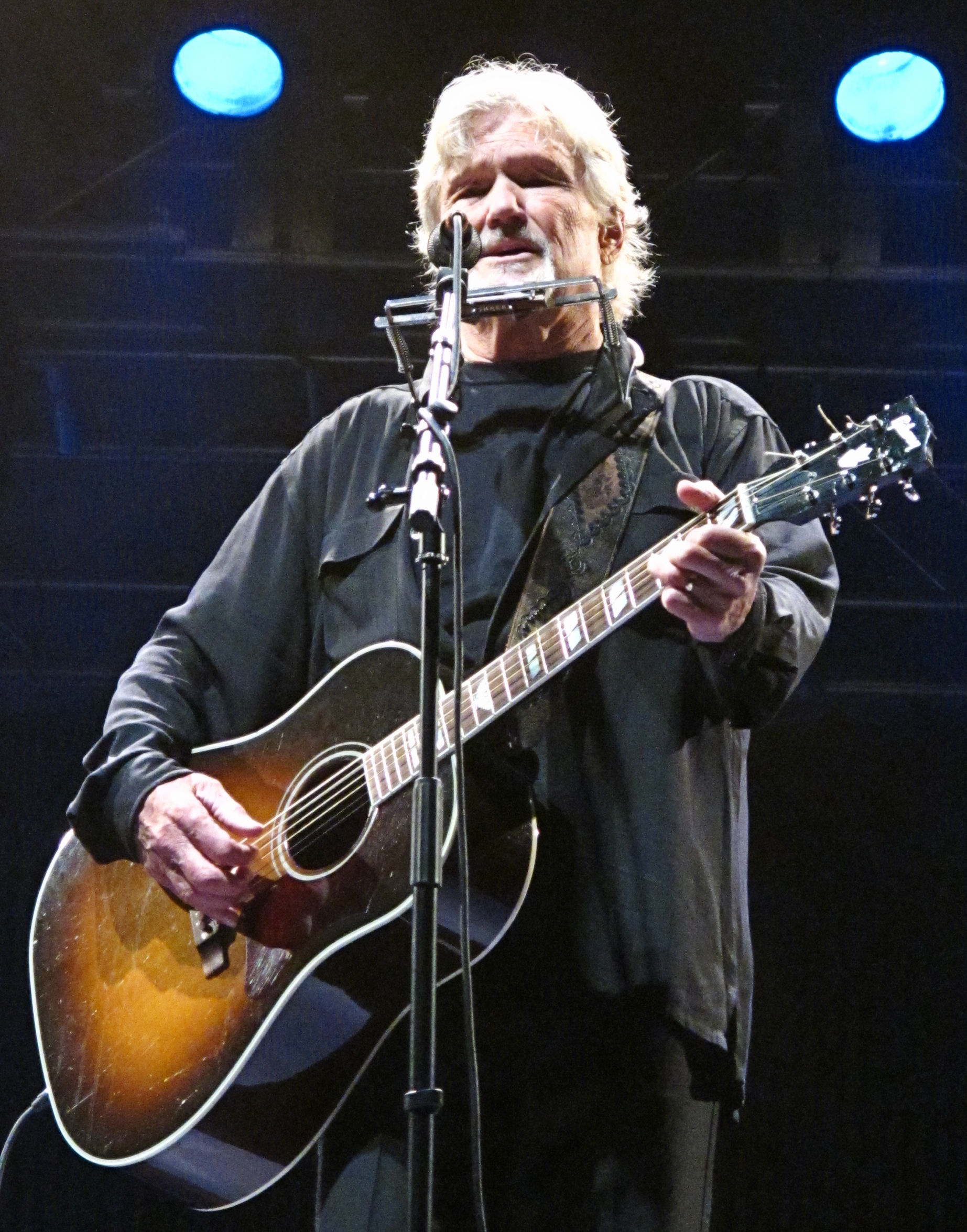
Kris Kristofferson with his reissue (or original) round shouldered SJ in Munich, 2010

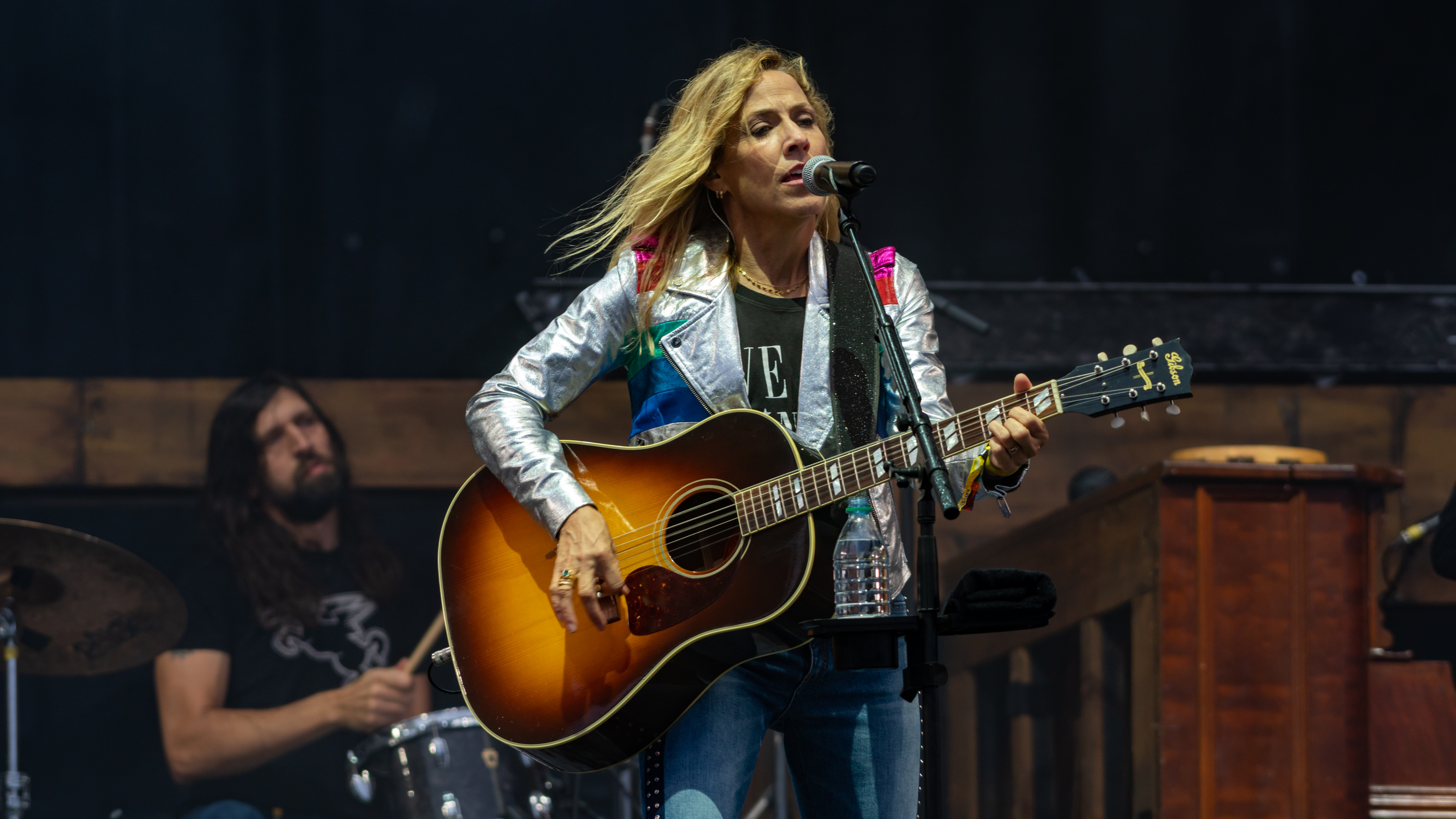
Sheryl Crow on stage in 2018, with her reissue "Special Edition Sheryl Crow" Southern Jumbo with "banner" headstock

Gibson introduced the Southern Jumbo also known as the Southerner Jumbo or SJ guitar in 1942, as a more "deluxe" version of its popular but plain J-45 model. It featured a sunburst spruce top, mahogany back and sides (a few rare early examples had rosewood back and sides, or rosewood sides only), rosewood bridge and fingerboard, with Gibson's "deluxe" split parallelogram pearl inlays. From 1947 onwards the model also featured a white bound fingerboard, in contrast to the plain (unbound) fingerboard of the cheaper J-45 and its sister (natural finish) J-50 instrument.

For the first 20 years of its existence, the Southern Jumbo - along with its later "sister model", the natural finish SJN or Country Western, introduced in 1956 - possessed a round- or slope-shouldered design, which changed for both models to the more "modern" square-shouldered design (as debuted on the 1960-introduced Hummingbird) in 1962. From 1949, in common with other Gibson and their later sister line Epiphone instruments of the 1960s, the bridge on the Southern Jumbo was of a "belly up" design, which changed to "belly down" in 1969, along with some modifications to the top bracing. In 1970, additional structural reinforcement to the top (the (in)famous double-X bracing) was introduced which, although it contributed to improved structural stability, had a deleterious effect on the tone. Along with the Country Western, the "original run" of the SJ was discontinued in 1978.

The 1960 Gibson catalog listed the (round shouldered) Southern Jumbo at $165.00 (without case), as compared to the "SJN Country Western" at $179.50, with the less deluxe J-50 and J-45 priced at $145.00 and $135.00, respectively; at the same time, the most expensive flat-top guitar in the Gibson line, the J-200N (J-200 in natural finish) was priced at $410.00. By 1967, the now square shouldered "SJN Country Western" and the SJ had the same list price of $265.00, with the J-50 and J-45 (which retained their round shoulders through this period) both at $220.00.

Both the 1942-62 (round shouldered) and the subsequent square shouldered version, at least up to 1968, are well regarded by collectors and players. Of the square shouldered version, Whitford, Vinopal & Erlewine write:

By far the most desirable of the square-shouldered SJs are those from 1962 to 1968, a period in which their bodies were lightly built, with top bracing wide-spread and set forward. The SJ/SJN stayed with the 24 3/4" scale throughout this period, though in 1965 a switch was made to a narrower neck, in keeping with the other Gibsons of the period.

Back in 1977, Tom and Mary Anne Evans in their book "Guitars - from the Renaissance to Rock" had this to say regarding a 1959, round-shouldered example of a Country Western (essentially a SJ in natural finish):

Gibson's fourteen-fret-neck Dreadnought guitars of this vintage were among the most successful ever made. With a decade and a half of aging behind them, the best have a delightful sound. Not only are the basses extremely rich, but the balance from string to string, and the carrying power of the treble, are exceptional for a Dreadnought.

Since the late 1990s, Gibson has issued a number of re-creations of the original, round-shouldered Southern Jumbo including several named after particular artists, in particular a Hank Williams Jr. edition (c. 1997), a Woody Guthrie edition, based on the 1945 model owned by the latter artist, an Aaron Lewis model (2010), a Sheryl Crow "Special Edition" based on the pre-1946 "banner" version and a Kris Kristofferson edition, current as at 2018, as well as a reissue round shouldered Southern Jumbo in both "Traditional" and "New Vintage" versions as at 2018. In 2015, Gibson also made a limited run of 65 round shouldered (original style) Southern Jumbos with a 12-fret neck (all other examples being 14-fret) and a larger, "radiused body".

== See also ==
- List of products manufactured by Gibson Guitar Corporation
