= Chris Eccleshall =

English luthier (1948–2020)

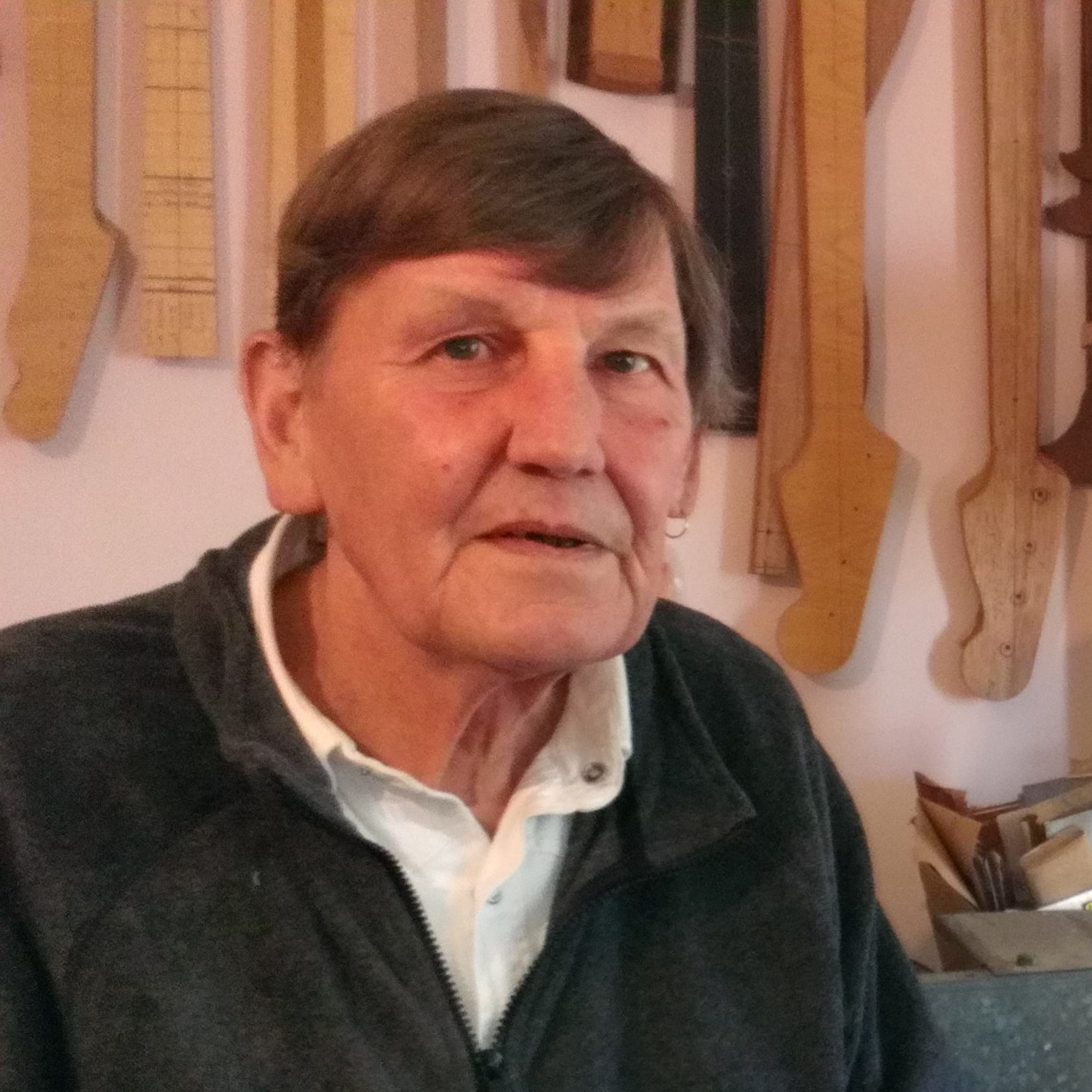
- Eccleshall in his workshop in 2014
- Born: Christopher Eccleshall; 26 May 1948; Gosport, England, UK
- Died: 13 August 2020 (aged 72); Dartington, Devon, UK
- Children: Michael Eccleshall, Morwenna Del Mar

Christopher J. Eccleshall (26 May 1948 – 13 August 2020) was an English luthier, guitar designer, guitar dealer and authorised repairer of Martin, Gibson and Guild guitars, and also received the blessing of Mario Maccaferri to make reproductions of his Selmer-Maccaferri jazz guitars.

== Biography ==
Born in Gosport, Hampshire, Eccleshall was the son of Doreen Eccleshall (née Davies) and Leslie Eccleshall.

His main business was making custom-built acoustic and electric guitars, and later a standard range of solid body electrics under the name "Electric Lady." He also made solid-bodied electric mandolins, acoustic mandolins, mandolas and bouzoukis.

Eccleshall originally trained as a violin maker with W. E. Hill and Sons of Bond Street, London, who at the time were the number one violin company in the world. He was also an engineer in the Fleet Air Arm. Later he moved to Ealing Strings on Ealing Common, London. During this time Eccleshall still found time to make and repair guitars, eventually becoming so busy, especially with work on multiple instruments owned by Rory Gallagher, that he set up his own workshop and went into making guitars full-time. British guitar makers were virtually unheard of at the time, but Eccleshall was one of the first to win recognition, along with Tony Zemaitis and John Birch. Week after week the three were involved in a competition to get their outlandish guitar designs onto Top of the Pops during the heyday of British glam rock. Although his name is better known to insiders than to the general public, Eccleshall became well established as one of the world's leading guitar makers.

Eccleshall was married to Antonia Del Mar from 1977 to 1991. The couple had two children, Michael and Morwenna. The marriage ended in divorce. Eccleshall died on 13 August 2020, at the age of 72. His survivors include his two children, a grandson, and his sister.

== Celebrity customers ==
Over the years Eccleshall's customers included Pete Townshend, Dave Davies, David Bowie, Rory Gallagher, Paul Weller, Davey Arthur (The Fureys), Sweet, The Cure, Levellers, Peter Hook of New Order, The Alarm, Echo & the Bunnymen, This Picture, The Men They Couldn't Hang, Steven Woodcock, Richard Stilgoe and Richard Digance.

== Collaborations ==
Electric Lady range

In the early 1980s Eccleshall made a licensing deal with the Japanese-made brand Kimbara to make and distribute an Eccleshall-designed Stratocaster-style guitar. Eccleshall travelled to the Japanese factory to supervise the setup and was very pleased with Japanese engineering standards. These guitars are very rare in Europe and are mostly now in Japan and America. In 1986 Eccleshall uprooted from his native Ealing to move to Dartington and a few years later moved his workshop again to Buckfastleigh. In 2008 Eccleshall and local timberman and guitarist Eddie Cameron created a series of co-designed guitars handmade by Eccleshall to a standard design and marketed under the name Electric Lady, again based on the Stratocaster but with locally sourced timber and British humbucking pick-ups. Eccleshall's last home and workshop was in Totnes.

== Training ==
Eccleshall worked with many apprentices and assistants, and trained and advised other luthiers including George Lowden and Kevin Chilcott, as well as several Japanese apprentices after his collaboration with Kimbara, throughout his career.

== Innovations ==
Eccleshall was responsible for several inventions for which he never received the credit. He claimed to have been the first to house a guitar neck's truss rod in an alloy U-channel, made the first sideless hardtail bridge for a Telecaster (without the original design's raised edges, which are intended to hold a chromed pick-up cover which hardly anyone uses), and pioneered the rectangular solid machined steel block bridge saddles which are now the standard type on modern Telecasters & Stratocasters. He also built a solid body electric sitar, not a sitar guitar but a real sitar, for the late John Perkins

== Historic guitars ==
Eccleshall was responsible for rebuilding Pete Townshend's smashed guitars until he found it too upsetting to continue. Until his death he kept an SG body with a Meher Baba sticker from that era. He was Rory Gallagher's favoured guitar technician from 1971 to 1985, rebuilding and re-fretting his battered Fender Stratocaster 18 times (and replacing the neck once), and was responsible for disabling the Strat's vibrato mechanism using a wooden block, a modification he was later also commissioned to apply to Eric Clapton's "Blackie".

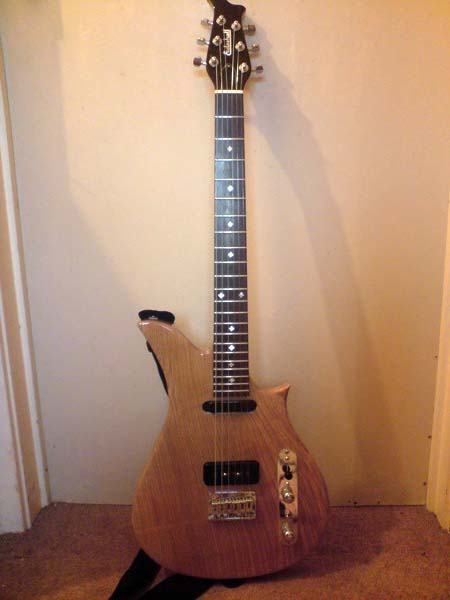
Custom-made Eccleshall Scimitar

== Original designs ==
The Eccleshall Scimitar (24.75" scale), Barracuda (25.5") and Excalibur bass have original shapes based on outward curves, rather than the inward curves of traditional electric guitars derived from the rounded classical guitar - and the pointed lower horn of the Scimitar is reminiscent of that of the Gibson mandolin.

== Variations ==
Eccleshall's C-Model acoustic guitar has a classical guitar shaped body, but for steel strings. His "Special" is a slightly larger variant of this. Many of Eccleshall's standard designs are modified versions of shapes associated with Gibson guitars. His B-Model acoustic is based on the J-200 acoustic, but is smaller. The Kestrel and Falcon electric guitars have solid bodies but with a 335 outline. The MC Model has the 175 outline but in 3/4 size with a slimline body. His 335-style bass is a unique hollow-bodied instrument used by Eddie Macdonald of The Alarm, Peter Hook of Joy Division & New Order and Simon Gallup of The Cure. Eccleshall's solid electric mandolin is used by many electric folk bands and features a pick-up hand-wound by Eccleshall.
