= Gibson Country Western =

Flat-top acoustic guitar

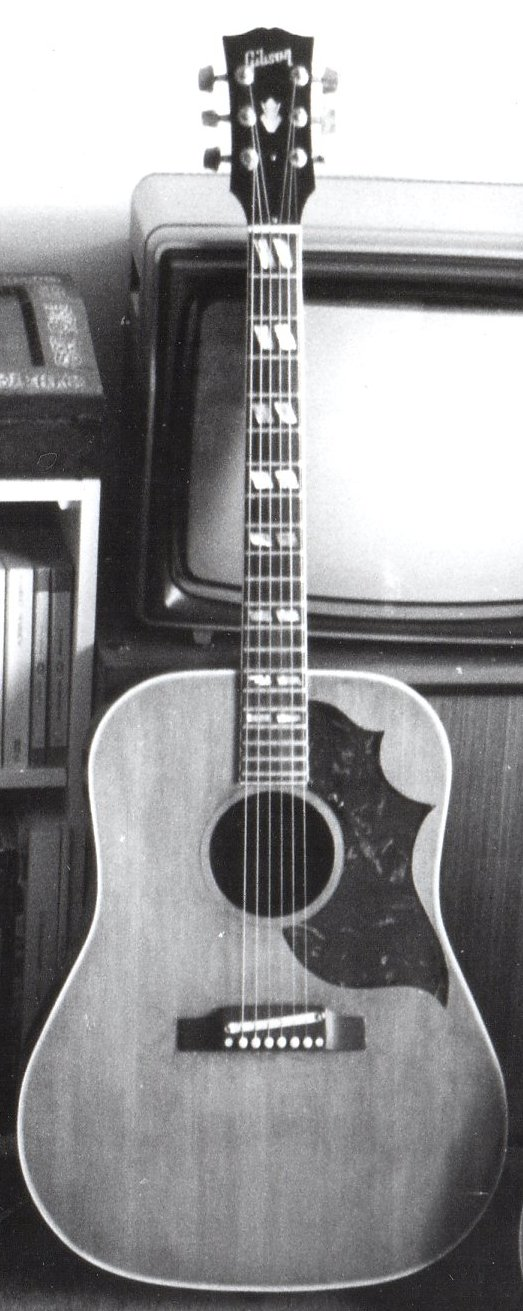
A 1964 Gibson Country Western

The Gibson Country Western is a flat-top acoustic guitar model originally manufactured by the Gibson Guitar Corporation between 1956 (or 1955) and 1978. For the first 6(7) years of its manufacture it was a round-shouldered instrument, which changed to square-shouldered in 1962. Sheryl Crow preferred the 1962 model, and uses a modern version of her 1962 instrument released under her name.

== History ==
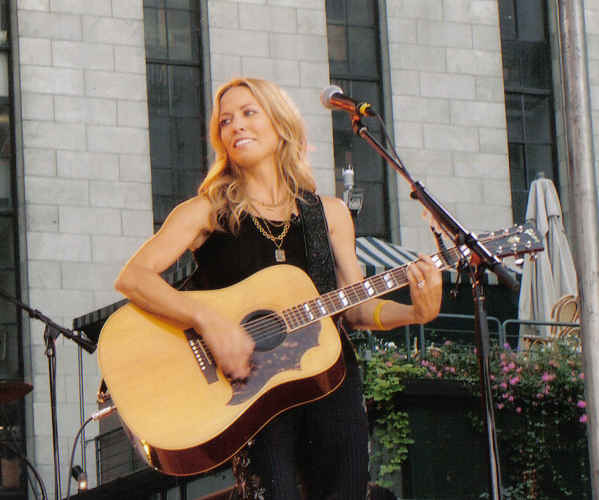
Sheryl Crow with her (1962 or reissue) Country Western guitar

Gibson introduced the Country Western guitar in 1955/1956 (sources such as "Gruhn's Guide to Vintage Guitars" say 1956, however other sources say 1955 as per this account), as a version of their pre-existing Southern Jumbo but with a natural finish, as opposed to the sunburst finish of the Southern Jumbo (SJ). Like the SJ, it featured a spruce top, mahogany back and sides, rosewood bridge and fingerboard, with Gibson's "deluxe" split parallelogram pearl inlays. From 1960 onwards the model was renamed the "SJN" (Southern Jumbo Natural) and/or the "SJN Country Western", however the name "Country Western" reappeared on the instrument label in 1962. In accounts of Gibson guitar history the model name is sometimes given as being hyphenated, i.e. Country-Western, however on the attached instrument labels it appears unhyphenated.

For the first 6 (or 7) its years of existence, the Country Western – along with its "sister model" SJ – possessed a round- or slope-shouldered design, which changed for both models to the more "modern" square-shouldered design (as debuted on the 1960-introduced Hummingbird) in 1962. In common with other Gibson and their sister line Epiphone instruments of the period, the bridge on the Country Western was of a "belly up" design, which changed to "belly down" in 1969, along with some modifications to the top bracing. In 1970, additional structural reinforcement to the top (the (in)famous double-X bracing) was introduced which, although it contributed to improved structural stability, had a deleterious effect on the tone. Along with the SJ, the "original run" Country Western was discontinued in 1978.

The 1960 Gibson catalog listed the (round shouldered) "SJN Country Western" at $179.50 (without case), as compared to $165.00 for the SJ, with the less deluxe J-50 and J-45 priced at $145.00 and $135.00, respectively; at the same time, the most expensive flat-top guitar in the Gibson line, the J-200N (J-200 in natural finish) was priced at $410.00. By 1967, the now square shouldered "SJN Country Western" and the SJ had the same list price of $265.00, with the J-50 and J-45 (which retained their round shoulders through this period) both at $220.00.

Both the 1956–62 (round shouldered) and the subsequent square shouldered version, at least up to 1968, are well regarded by collectors and players. Of the square shouldered version, Whitford, Vinopal & Erlewine write:

By far the most desirable of the square-shouldered SJs [and SJN/Country Westerns] are those from 1962 to 1968, a period in which their bodies were lightly built, with top bracing wide-spread and set forward. The SJ/SJN stayed with the 24 3/4" scale throughout this period, though in 1965 a switch was made to a narrower neck, in keeping with the other Gibsons of the period.

Back in 1977, Tom and Mary Anne Evans in their book "Guitars – from the Renaissance to Rock" had this to say regarding a 1959, round-shouldered example of a Country Western:

Gibson's fourteen-fret-neck Dreadnought guitars of this vintage were among the most successful ever made. With a decade and a half of aging behind them, the best have a delightful sound. Not only are the basses extremely rich, but the balance from string to string, and the carrying power of the treble, are exceptional for a Dreadnought.

Sheryl Crow is a notable user of the square shouldered (1962 era) Country Western, and Gibson has produced a reissue Country Western model bearing her name. A limited run of 85 instruments labelled "The January Limited Edition Country Western" was also produced in 2016.

== See also ==
- List of products manufactured by Gibson Guitar Corporation
