= Doug Ostgard =

Doug “Dougie Fresh” Ostgard
- Born: Doug Ostgard
- Genres: Jazz, Bebop, New-age
- Occupations: music instructor, composer, multi-instrumentalist, Photographer
- Instruments: Flute, Clarinet, Saxophone, Bassoon, Oboe, Recorder, Irish flute, Irish whistle, Valve Trombone
- Label: Vanza Music

Doug Ostgard is an American professional musician specializing in woodwinds. He has backed up an impressive list of showbiz greats, from Frank Sinatra, Tony Bennett and Johnny Mathis to Rosemary Clooney, Lena Horne and Ann-Margret.

Doug Ostgard is currently a woodwinds player located in Western Washington. He plays a dazzling array of instruments including saxophone, bassoon, oboe, flute, and clarinet. He has released an album entitled Silhouette in 2007 in collaboration with seven time Emmy winner and Grammy nominee Steven Ray Allen.

Doug has played in a variety of venues, such as 5th Avenue, the Paramount Theater, and a number of showrooms in Las Vegas including Caesars Palace. He was also a member of the Heart World Tour. He currently performs and teaches out of his home in Black Diamond, Washington while also teaching aspiring high school students during the school year at Bellevue Community College. He has also worked as a judge for various jazz competitions and festivals such as the Bellevue, Washington jazz festival.

== Style ==
Doug Ostgard describes his style to reflect that of Phil Woods', but his tone to reflect more of a Cannonball Adderley style. Doug currently plays on a Selmer Mark VI alto saxophone.

Doug also plays an extremely wide variety of instruments that are featured in his album "Silhouette" including an Alexander Eppler wooden flute headjoint on a Moritz Maz Mönnig wooden flute.

== Discography ==
Year	Album	Leader	Label
2007	Silhouette	Ostgard & Allen	Vanza Music
