= Gibson Advanced Jumbo =

Acoustic flattop guitar

- Manufacturer: Gibson
- Period: 1936–1938 (succeeded by the J-200)

Construction
- Body type: Dreadnought
- Neck joint: Dovetail

Woods
- Body: Sitka Spruce top Rosewood back and sides
- Neck: Mahogany
- Fretboard: Rosewood

Hardware
- Bridge: Rosewood

Colors available
- Vintage Sunburst

The Gibson Advanced Jumbo was an acoustic flattop guitar made by the Gibson Guitar Corporation. Introduced in 1936, is still considered a classic. Only 300 guitars were produced before Gibson replaced it with the Gibson J-200 Super Jumbo, but these guitars are still prized by collectors and musicians today.

== Prototype ==
In 1931 Gibson introduced its first versions of the Dreadnought acoustic guitars, branded by C. F. Martin & Company. Wider and with a more powerful sound than all the other flattop guitars on the market, they were immediately successful. The first Gibson Jumbo was similar to a Dreadnought, but had more rounded shoulders. It had a 16" body, 4 1/2" deep, with a fixed pinned bridge that had a slanted compensating saddle. The Jumbo had a sunburst finish. It was made of mahogany, and had a spruce top and a rosewood fingerboard.

== Production 1936-1938 ==
The Advanced Jumbo replaced the original Gibson Jumbo. It had rosewood back and sides, an Adirondack Spruce soundboard, a 25.5 inch scale length, and a 1.725 inch nut width. The Advanced Jumbo and the Jumbo 35 were both introduced in 1936. Both of these instruments were 16 inches (410 mm) wide, and had 14 frets clear of their bodies. The Jumbo 35 was the lower-priced model, going for just $35. The Advanced Jumbo was retailed at $80, still less than the $100 Martin D-28 Dreadnought. It was also built a bit more inexpensively than the Martin instrument. For example, the main braces did not tuck into the side bandings, which could cause problems.

The Gibson Advanced Jumbo was favored by 1930s players such as Bob Baker, a singing cowboy. A famous bluegrass player said the Advanced Jumbo blew him away the first time he ever touched one. According to one collector, "The Advanced Jumbo was probably the best flattop in Gibson's entire history, a wonderful guitar". However, production ceased after a small run of 300 guitars.

== Postproduction ==
In 1938–1939 Gibson replaced the Advanced Jumbo with the Super Jumbo 100 and Super Jumbo 200. The Super Jumbo was still being produced in 2003. Gibson's Ray Whitley-branded "Recording King", introduced in 1939, was a similar sized flattop guitar with rosewood back and sides and a sunburst spruce top. The Advanced Jumbos remain valued. Today an Advanced Jumbo would fetch about the same as a prewar Martin herringbone D-28. A price of $1,600 was asked for an Advanced Jumbo "reissue" in 1995.
