= Recording King =

Musical instrument maker and brand

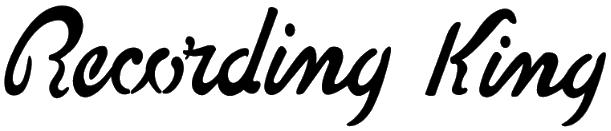
- Product type: Musical instruments
- Current owner: Music Link Corporation (c. 2010–)
- Country: United States
- Introduced: 1930s
- Discontinued: 1939; then revived in 2007
- Markets: Worldwide
- Previous owners: Montgomery Ward (1930s)
- Registered as a trademark in: 12 April 2011 (latest), United States
- Website: recordingking.com

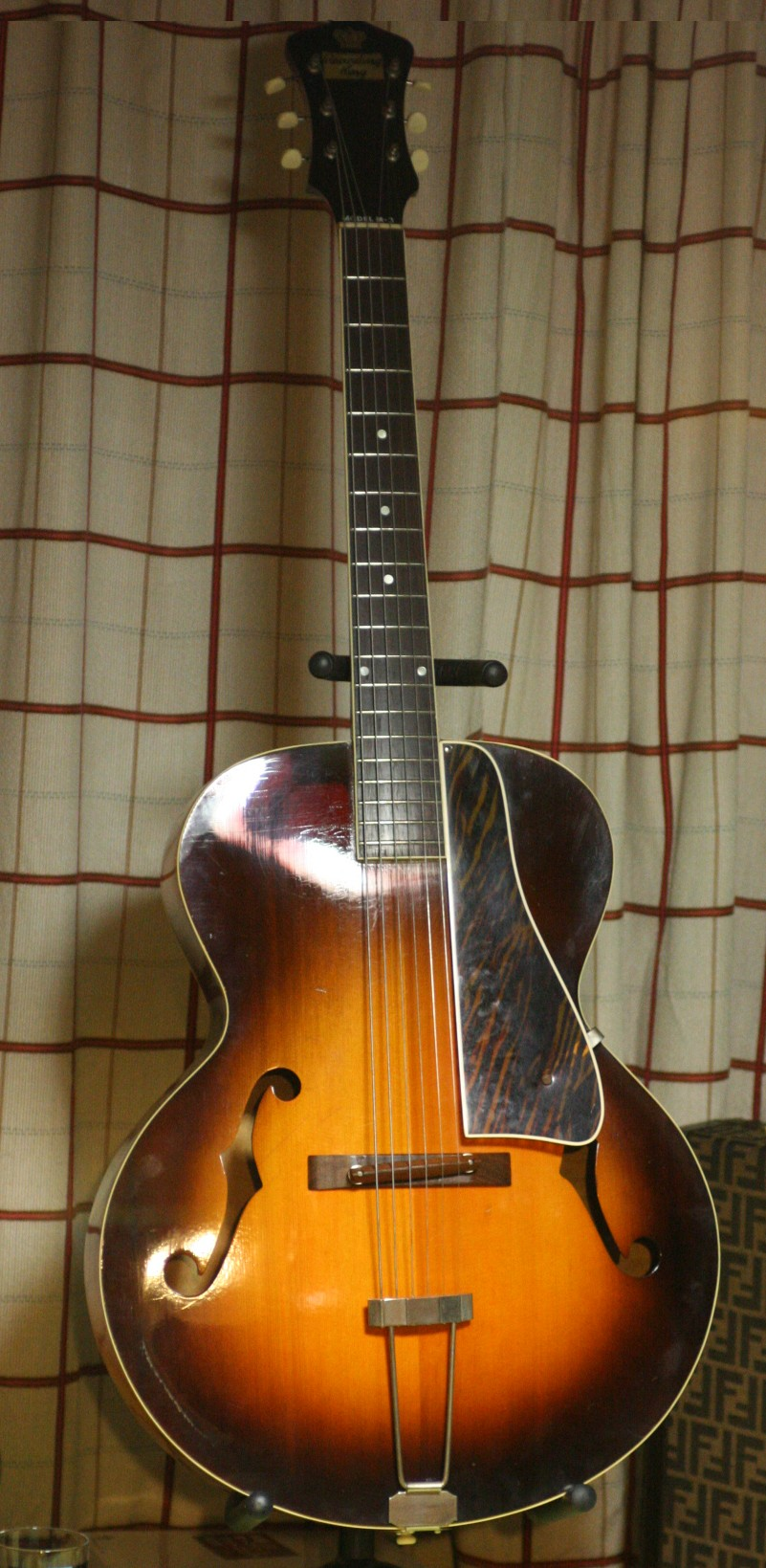
1940 Recording King archtop by Gibson

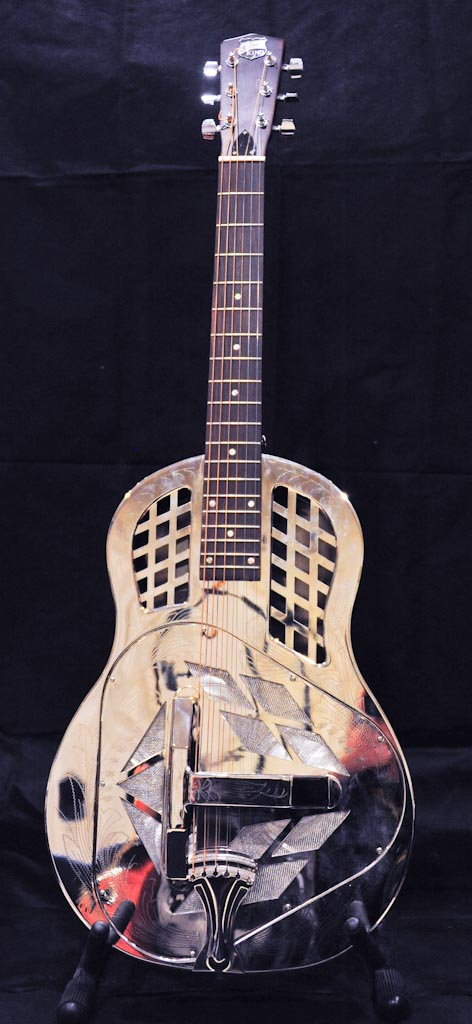
Recording King Tricone (after 2007)

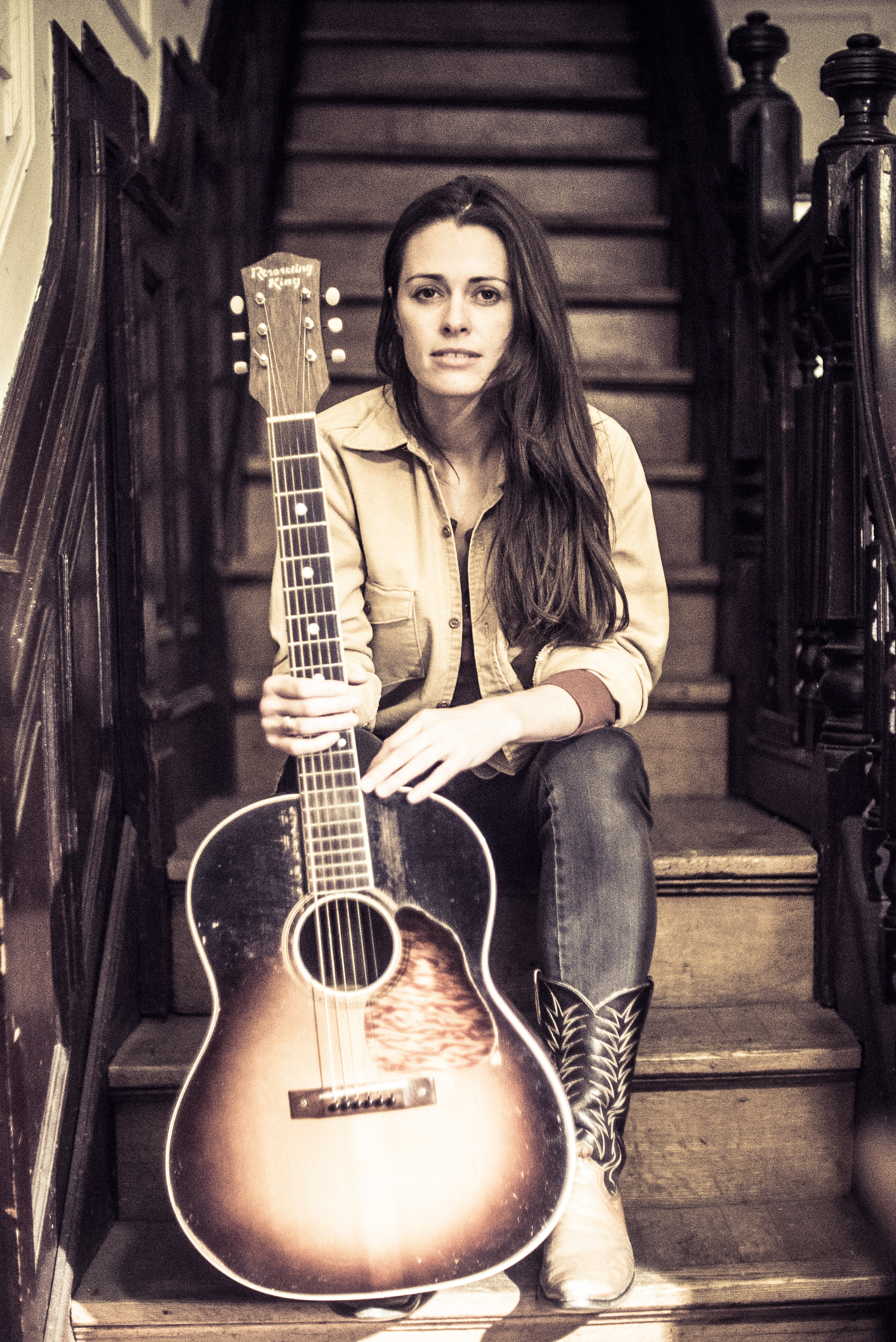
Singer songwriter Caitlin Canty writes and plays her songs with a 1930s Recording King guitar

Recording King is a musical instruments brand currently owned by The Music Link Corporation, based in Hayward, California, which also produces other musical instrument lines.

Range of products commercialised under the Recording King brand are acoustic and resonator guitars, and banjos. Their guitars are designed in America, manufactured overseas and sold worldwide.

== Brand history ==
Recording King started as a house brand for Montgomery Ward in the 1930s. Guitarist John Fahey played a 1939 model which was sold to him by Jon Lunberg in 1969 after having work performed on it by Mario Martello. The original guitar was similar to the Gibson Advanced Jumbo, discontinued in 1939. The brand was revived by Frederick Sheppard in 2001 after the death of John Fahey after which a disputed trademark claim was filed. Ownership of the trademark was then passed on to another entity who produced instruments under that name overseas.

== Musicians ==
Musicians who use Recording King guitars include Justin Townes Earle.
