= Chord Master =

Automated chording device for the ukulele

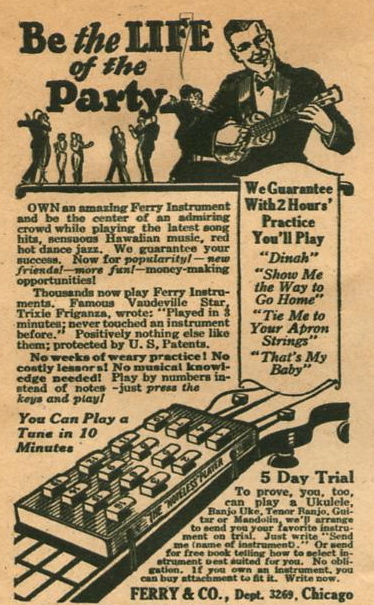
A 1926 advertisement for the "Noteless Player"

Chord Master (also rendered Visual Chord Master, chordmaster) is the brand-name for a type of automated chording device produced for the ukulele. Competing products were sold under labels such as Noteless Player by Ferry & Co. These devices allowed a ukulele player to easily play chords simply by choosing the mechanical button on the device labeled for the desired chord, and depressing it, causing mechanical levers to fret each string at the proper place to compose a chord.

The popular Chordmaster was produced by luthier Mario Maccaferri (known for designing plastic ukuleles) and his affiliated French American Reeds Manufacturing company; both his instruments and chord device are desired collector's items.

The term Chordmaster was also used for a guitar chord reference application for the iPhone OS in 2009. The application ranked #1 on the Apple App Store.
