= Selmer guitar =

Type of acoustic guitar

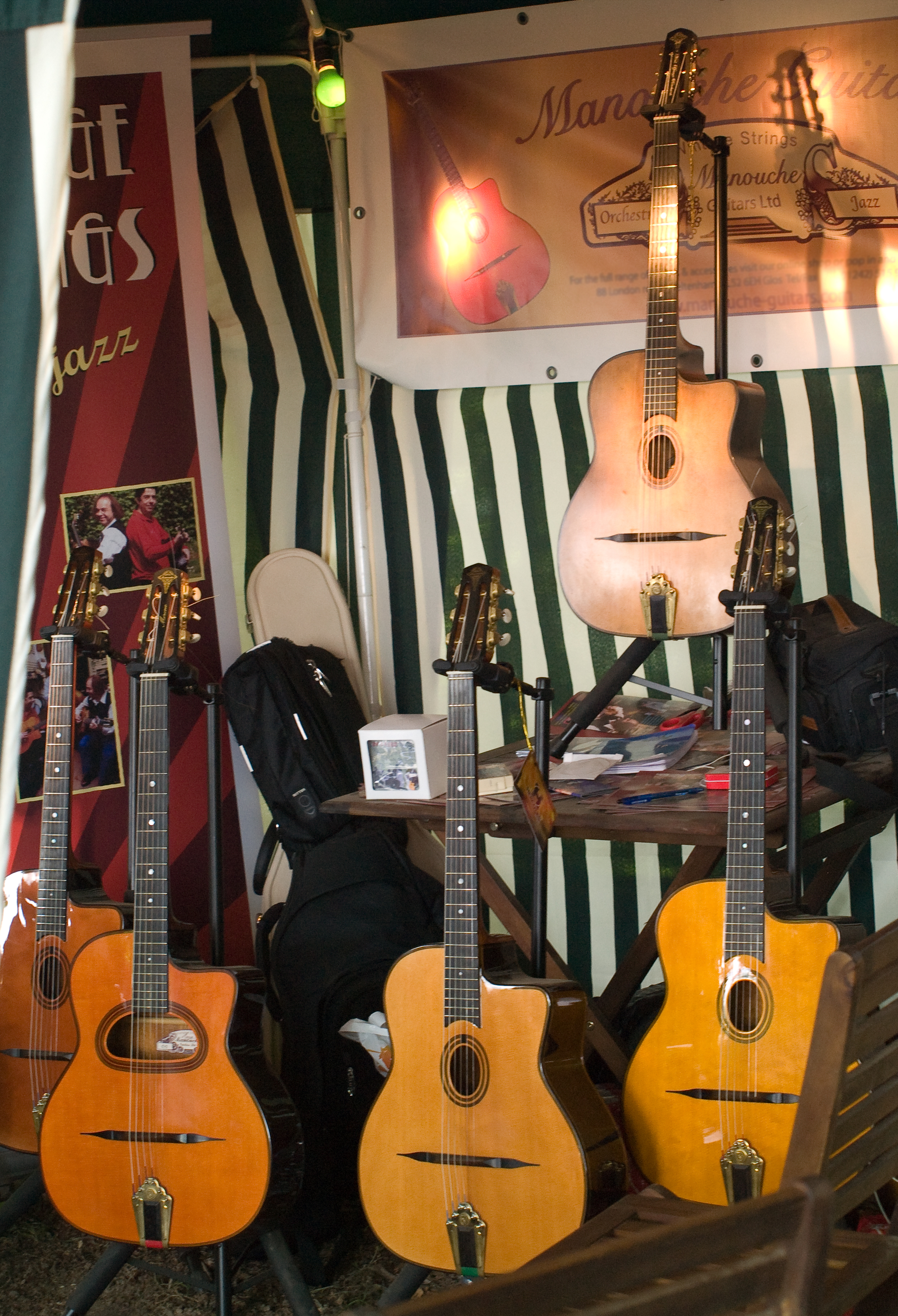
- Selmer-Maccaferri and Selmer style replica guitars
- Manufacturer: Selmer
- Period: 1932–1952

Construction
- Body type: Archtop-Selmer
- Neck joint: Dovetail

Woods
- Body: European Spruce (Picea abies) [original] or Sitka Spruce/Engelmann spruce [modern] top Rosewood or Mahogany back and sides
- Neck: Walnut
- Fretboard: Ebony

Hardware
- Bridge: Rosewood

Colors available
- Natural

The Selmer guitar — often called a Selmer-Maccaferri or just Maccaferri by English speakers, as early British advertising stressed the designer rather than manufacturer — is an unusual acoustic guitar best known as the favored instrument of Django Reinhardt. Selmer, a French manufacturer, produced the instrument from 1932 to about 1952.

== History ==
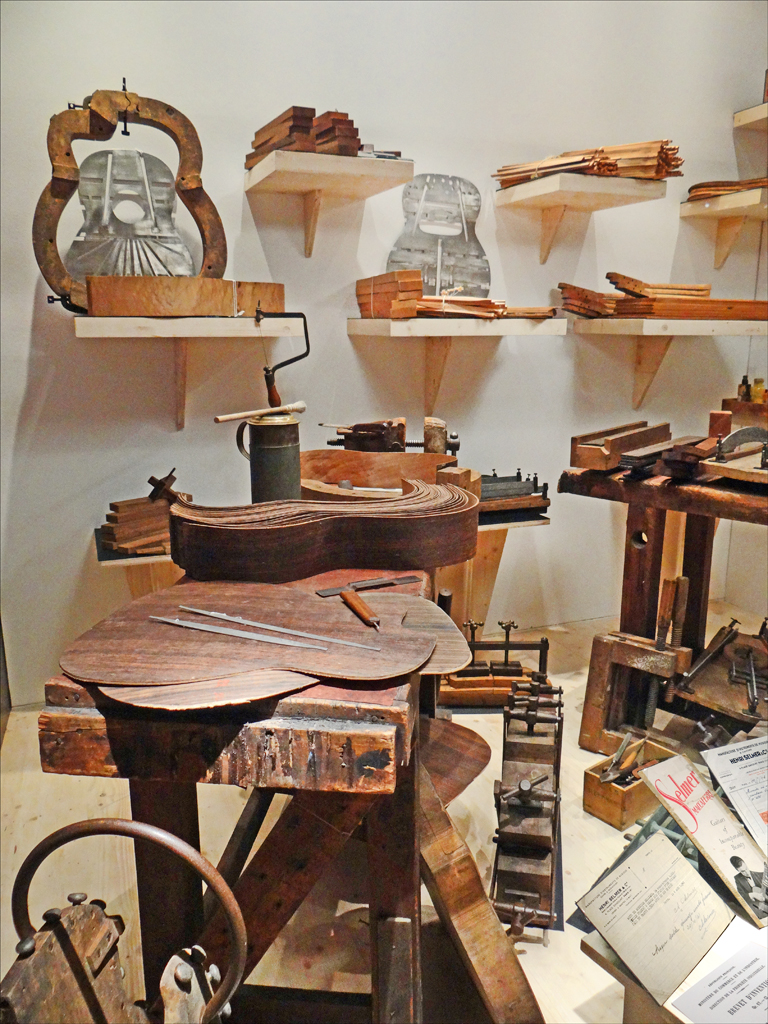
Reconstruction of a portion of the Selmer-Maccaferri guitar workshop (1933), Musée de la Musique exhibition, 2012

In 1932 Selmer partnered with the Italian guitarist and luthier Mario Maccaferri to produce a line of acoustic guitars based on Maccaferri's unorthodox design. Although Maccaferri's association with Selmer ended in 1934, the company continued to make several models of this guitar until 1952. The guitar was closely associated with jazz guitarist Django Reinhardt.

== Construction ==
In its archetypal steel-string Jazz/Orchestre form, the Selmer is distinguished by a fairly large body with squarish bouts, either a D-shaped or longitudinal oval sound hole, and a cutaway in the upper right bout. The strings pass over a movable bridge and are gathered at the tail, as on a mandolin. Two "moustache" markers are fixed to the soundboard to help position the movable bridge. The top of the guitar is gently arched or domed — a feature achieved by bending a flat piece of wood rather than by the violin-style carving used in archtop guitars. The top is also rather thin, at about 2 mm (0.079 in). It has a comparatively wide fretboard (about 47 mm or 1.850 in at the nut) and a snake-shaped, slotted headstock. The back and top are both ladder-braced, which was the norm for French and Italian steel-string guitars of the time (unlike American guitars, which frequently employed X-braced tops by this period).

Other models can be more conventional in appearance and construction, with the Modèle Classique, for example, essentially being a standard fan-braced, flat-top classical guitar.

== Early days: "Maccaferri" or D-hole guitar ==
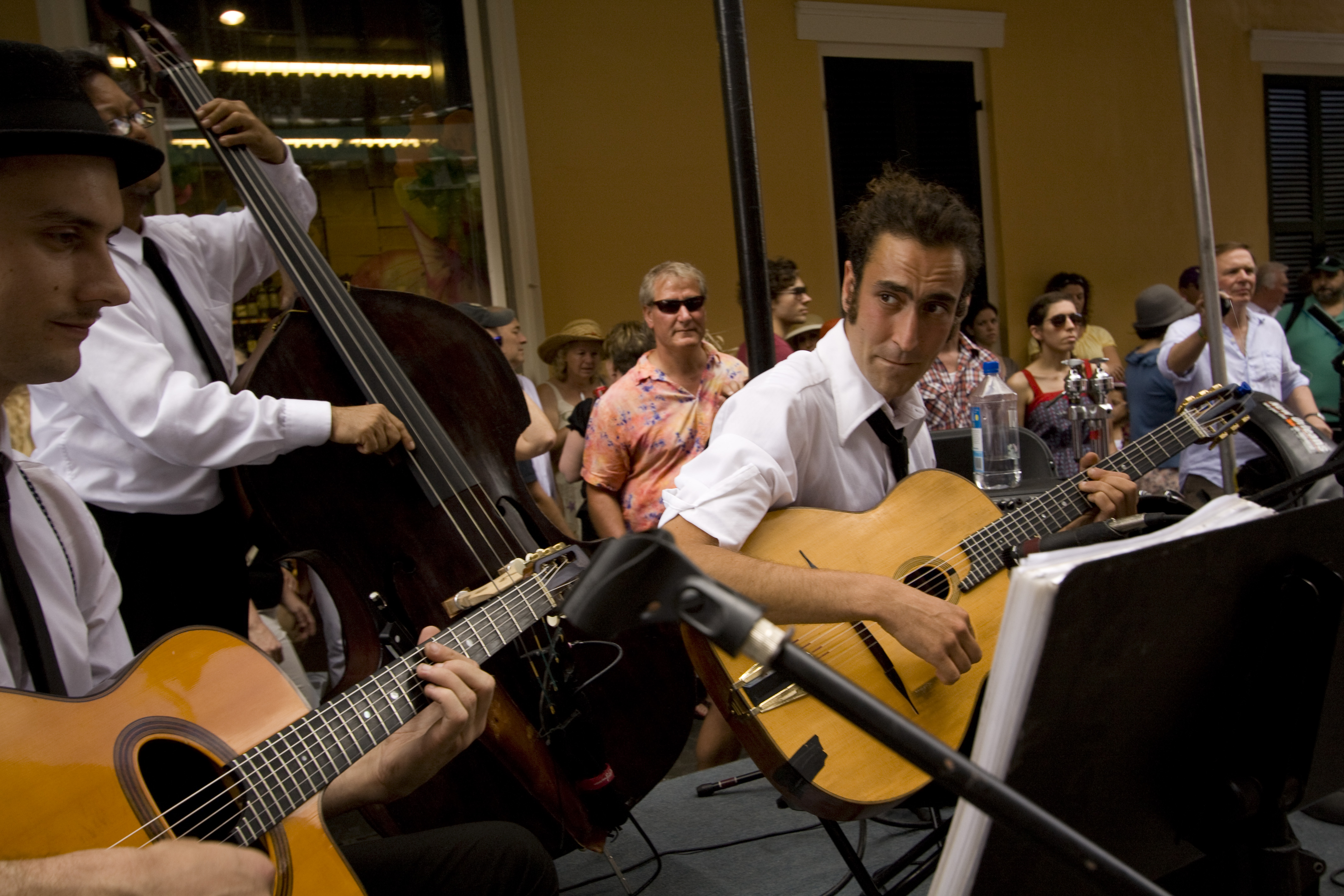
Tony Green's "Gypsy Jazz" group photographed in New Orleans in 2012. The lead player (right) performs on a "petite bouche", oval hole Selmer-style instrument; the rhythm player (left) uses a modern modification of the original Selmer "grande bouche" / D-hole instrument, with 14 frets clear of the body as opposed to the 12 frets of the original design.

Early models have a large, D-shaped sound hole (the "grande bouche", or "big mouth"), which was shaped specifically to accommodate an internal resonator invented by luthier Mario Maccaferri — this was designed to increase the volume of the guitar and to even out variations in volume and tone between different strings. The scale, at 640 mm, and fretting of the early guitars was very similar to other contemporary guitars (including the Gibson and Martin guitar designs from which most modern acoustic guitar patterns ultimately derive), but with a wide fretboard more typical of a classical guitar; they also had 12 frets clear of the body, although left hand higher fret access was facilitated by a (then novel) cutaway in the upper right bout. These guitars were made in several versions, including gut string (classical), steel string, seven string (Hawaiian) and four string ("Grand" and "Ténor") versions, plus a special four string "Eddie Freeman" model (see below). Many of these guitars, produced during 1932 and 1933, were sold to the UK market via Selmer's London showroom (which also distributed the guitar to regional dealers) and it was during this period that the guitars became known as "Maccaferris" to Britons.

== Post-Maccaferri or Oval-Hole guitar ==
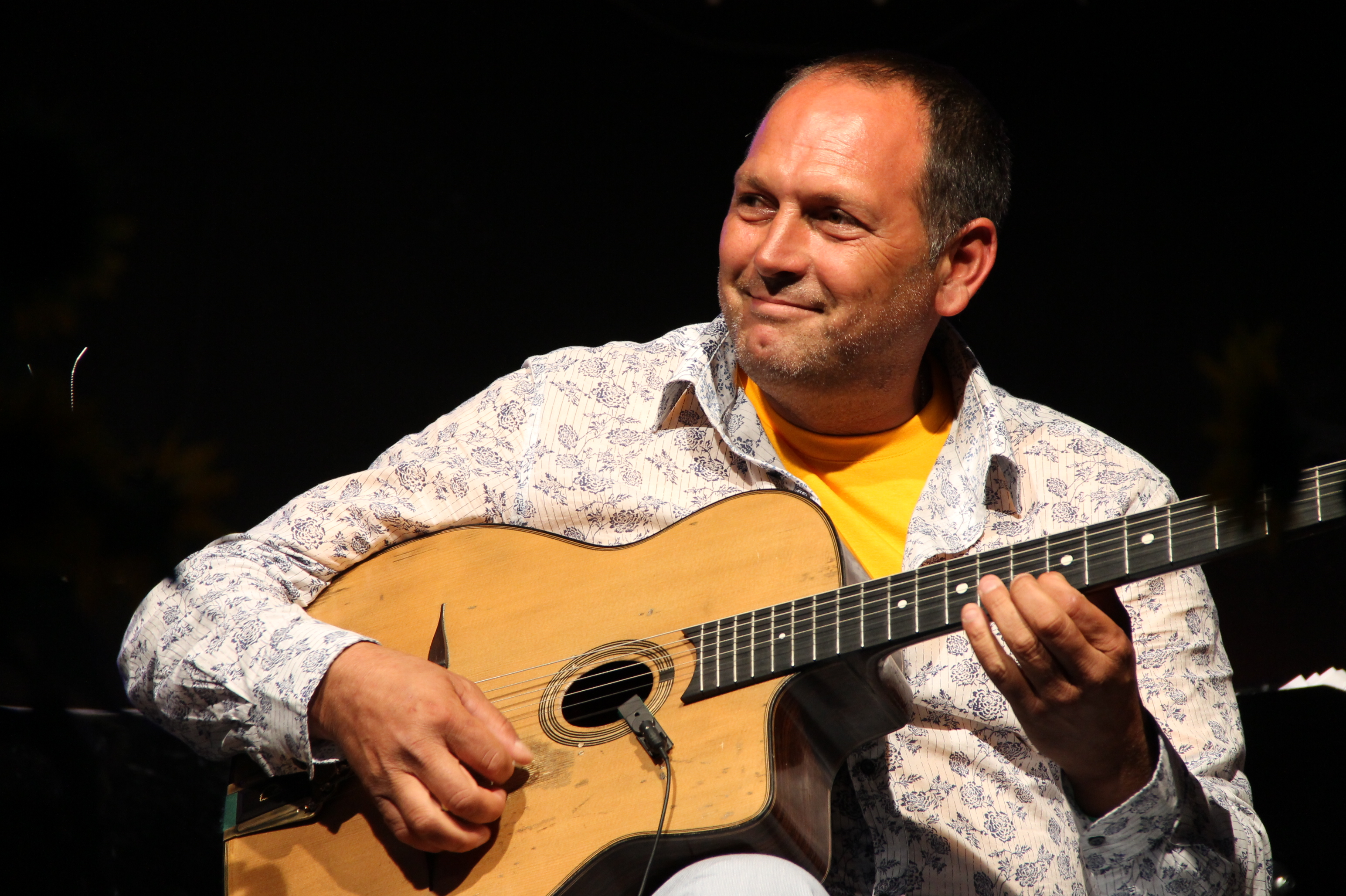
Original (?) oval-hole / "petite bouche" Selmer guitar being played by Stochelo Rosenberg, 2012

Maccaferri designed the original guitars and oversaw their manufacture, but his involvement with Selmer ended after 18 months. Over the next few years, the design evolved without his input (including some transitional models with round soundholes). By 1936, the definitive version of the Selmer guitar had appeared, with an oval hole in place of the large D-shaped hole, no internal resonator, and a neck with 14 frets clear of the body in place of the original 12. It was officially called the "Modèle Jazz", but also known as the "Petite Bouche" (small mouth) or "Oval Hole". These later guitars also have revised internal bracing and a longer scale length of 670 mm (26.38 in). The vast bulk of guitars produced after the Maccaferri period were sold in Selmer's native France; these later guitars are always referred to as "Selmers" (as are the earlier guitars by the French).

While Maccaferri may no longer have been around (and his resonator had been abandoned), the later guitars retain many unusual characteristics of his original innovative design, including the cutaway, the world's first sealed oil-bath machine heads and a top that is bent, mandolin-style, behind the floating bridge — something that contributes to the guitar's remarkable volume when played.

== Use ==
Before the advent of amplification, the Selmer guitar appealed to European players the way archtop guitars did in America: it was loud enough to hear over other instruments in a band. The "petite bouche" model has an especially loud and cutting voice, and remains the design preferred by lead players in Django-style bands, while the accompanying rhythm players often use D-hole instruments. (This was the lineup in Django's Quintette du Hot Club de France during its classic period in the late 1930s, and it remains the pattern for bands that emulate it.) Modern exponents of the style often amplify their instruments in concert, but may still play acoustically in small venues and jam sessions. Gypsy jazz players usually couple the guitar with light, silver-plated, copper-wound Argentine strings made by Savarez (or copies of these), and heavy plectrums, traditionally of tortoiseshell.

Today, the Selmer guitar is almost completely associated with Django Reinhardt and the "gypsy jazz" school of his followers. From the 1930s through to the 1950s, however, Selmers were used by all types of performer in France and (in the early days) in the UK. The first Selmers sold in the UK were used in standard dance bands, and were associated with performers such as Len Fillis and Al Bowlly.

In France, the Selmer was the top professional guitar for many years, and is heard in everything from musette to the backing of chansonniers. Leading players included Henri Crolla and Sacha Distel. More recently, the style of guitar (albeit a modification developed by Favino) has been associated with Enrico Macias.

== Other Selmer guitars ==
Though best known for its steel-string D-hole and oval-hole guitars (known initially as the "Orchestre" and later the "Jazz" model), during the Maccaferri period Selmer also made and sold Maccaferri-designed classical guitars, harp guitars, 6- and 7-string Hawaiian guitars, tenor guitars, a 4-string "Grande" model and the "Eddie Freeman Special", a 4-string guitar with the scale-length and body-size of a standard guitar, designed to use with a special reentrant tuning that was briefly successful in the UK market. Most of these instruments featured Macaferri's distinctive D-shaped sound hole and cutaway design, and many contained the resonator. Production of all but the Modèle Jazz ended by the mid-1930s. Selmer also contracted the well-known American luthier John D'Angelico to construct a small number of archtop guitars to be sold under the Selmer brand for the U.S. market; this arrangement was short-lived and apparently only three instruments were constructed, of which a single one (from 1934) is known to survive.

== Copies, replicas, and similar guitars ==
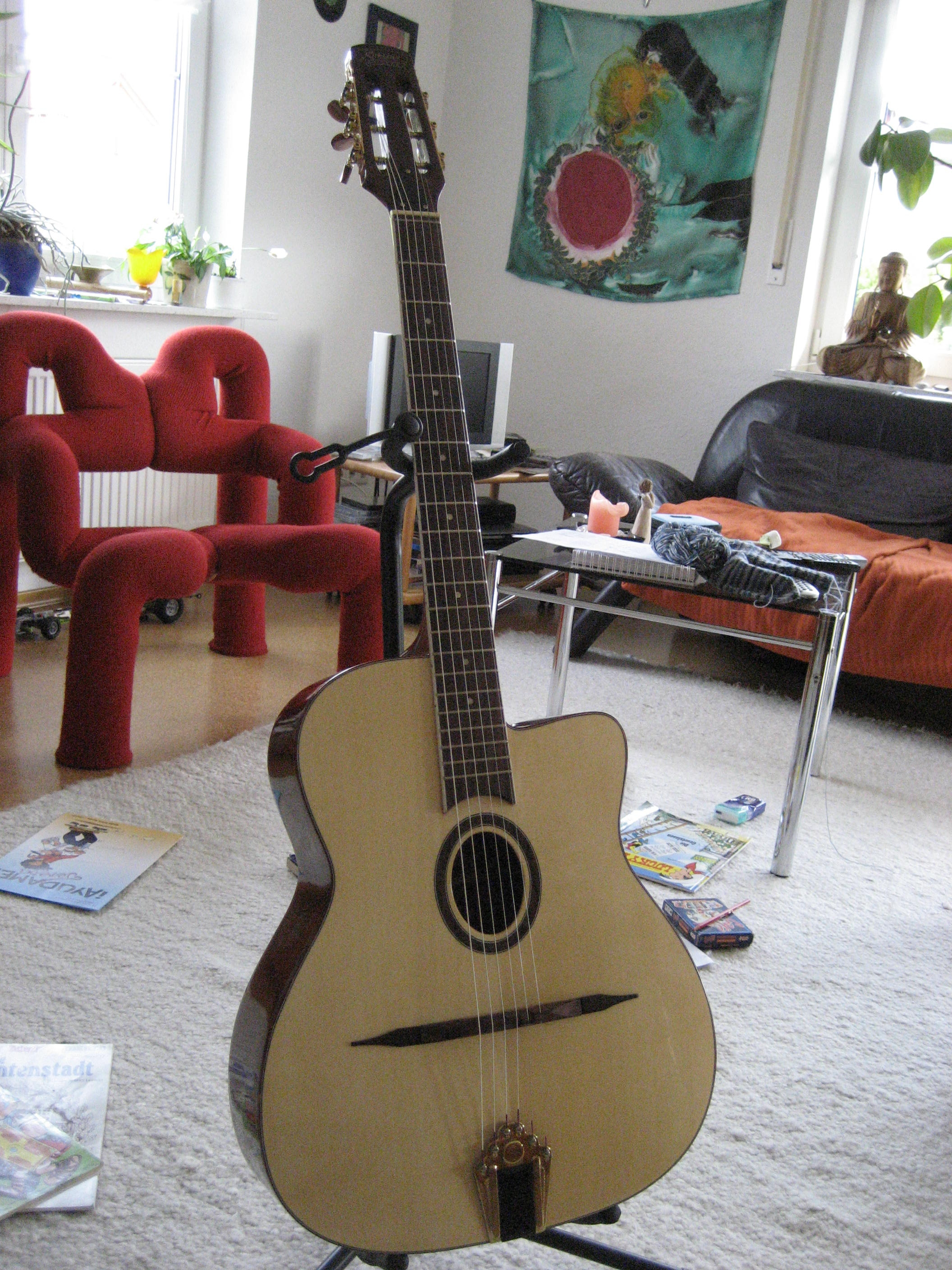
Copy of a Selmer Maccaferri guitar.

Selmer did not make many guitars — fewer than 1,000 — and the company stopped all production by 1952. Playable original Selmers are rare and command high prices. One of the largest collections was owned by Louis Gallo (1907-1988), a close friend of Mario Maccaferri, who also possessed blueprints of these guitars and was the consultant for the Ibanez CSL copies. Before the resurgence of interest in Django and his guitars, other European builders produced instruments that emulated the Selmer design, with their own variations. These instruments began to appear in the 1930s with Busato and Di Mauro, and in the 1940s there were Jacobacci, Favino, Anasatasio, the Gérôme Brothers, Olivieri, Rossi, Bucolo, Patenotte, Siro Burgassi, and a few others. In the 1970s, Selmer copies were produced in Japan for CSL and Ibanez, and in the 1980s for Saga Musical Instruments under the "Saga" brand. A few French luthiers continued production through that time as well, including Jean-Pierre Favino and, more recently, Maurice Dupont.

Some high-grade luthiers outside Italy and France have offered Selmer-style guitars. These include Marco Roccia, Jerome Duffell, AJL (Ari-Jukka Luomaranta), John Le Voi, David Hodson, Rob Aylward, Chris Eccleshall, and Doug Kyle in the UK; Michael Dunn, Shelley D. Park, and Michael Whitney in Canada; Leo Eimers in the Netherlands; Risto Ivanovski in Macedonia; and Rodrigo Shopis in New York City. Inexpensive factory instruments from Asia have also become available under the Gitane and Dell'Arte/John S. Kinnard brands.

Common departures from the original designs include omitting the internal resonator, adding a scratchplate, using solid (non-laminated) woods, and building D-hole models with the neck joined at the 14th fret rather than the original 12th.

== Surviving original Selmers ==
The number of surviving original Selmer guitars is not known exactly. Fewer than 200 are publicly known.

== Other Maccaferri guitars ==
Prior to his association with Selmer, Maccaferri had acquired a reputation for building classical guitars with features that were later incorporated into his Selmer design, including the cutaway, possibly the D-shaped sound hole, and in some cases, additional bass strings (harp guitars); photographs survive of Maccaferri himself performing on such instruments during the 1920s.

Following his severance from Selmer, in 1939 Maccaferri moved to the United States and became interested in plastic manufacturing. He produced plastic classical and steel-string guitars — of similar shape to his Selmer designs, albeit with F-holes — in the 1950s and 60s, along with many musical and non-musical plastic products. Produced first under his own name, and after 1964 under the name "Mastro", the guitars were of short scale, but accurately fretted and intonated. These instruments were not a huge success at the time and are now considered oddities. However, the many variants of Maccaferri's plastic ukulele enjoyed a considerable vogue in the 1950s and sold in large numbers.

Maccaferri also collaborated with Ibanez guitars in the late 1970s and early 1980s to produce an updated version of his original D-hole design, of which 440 were made. They were individually signed by him and are considered quite playable and collectable.

== Bibliography ==
- Charle, François (1999). The Story of Selmer Maccaferri Guitars. Translated by Karslake, David. Paris: François Charle. ISBN 2951351615.
