= Selmer Cigar Cutter =

Selmer Paris saxophone model (1930–1933)

The Selmer "Cigar Cutter" is the saxophone that was produced by the Selmer Company between 1930 and 1933. A cigar cutter saxophone will have a serial number ranging from 11951 to 18700 stamped on the side of the bell. They were officially part of the Selmer Super Sax (SSS) line, but were named for a uniquely designed octave mechanism that resembled a cigar cutter.

The Super series was a departure from Selmer's previous lighter sounding, more classically oriented concept that produced the Model 22, Model 26, and Model 28 saxophones, in response to the bolder, richer, and more dynamic American saxophones that gained popularity in the 1920s. The "Cigar Cutter" was preceded in the Super series by the New Largebore model and superseded by the Super, Radio Improved, and Jimmy Dorsey models. The latter were virtually identical except for the engraving. The bore design and tonal qualities of the Balanced Action, introduced in late 1935, were based on those of the Super series.

== Notable players ==
- Zoot Sims (Radio Improved)
- Herschel Evans
- Coleman Hawkins (Radio Improved, including 1939 Body and Soul recording).
- Gregory Tardy (Cigar Cutter, Radio Improved).
- Jerry Bergonzi (Cigar Cutter, Radio Improved).
