= Selmer Mark VI =

Saxophone line made by Selmer

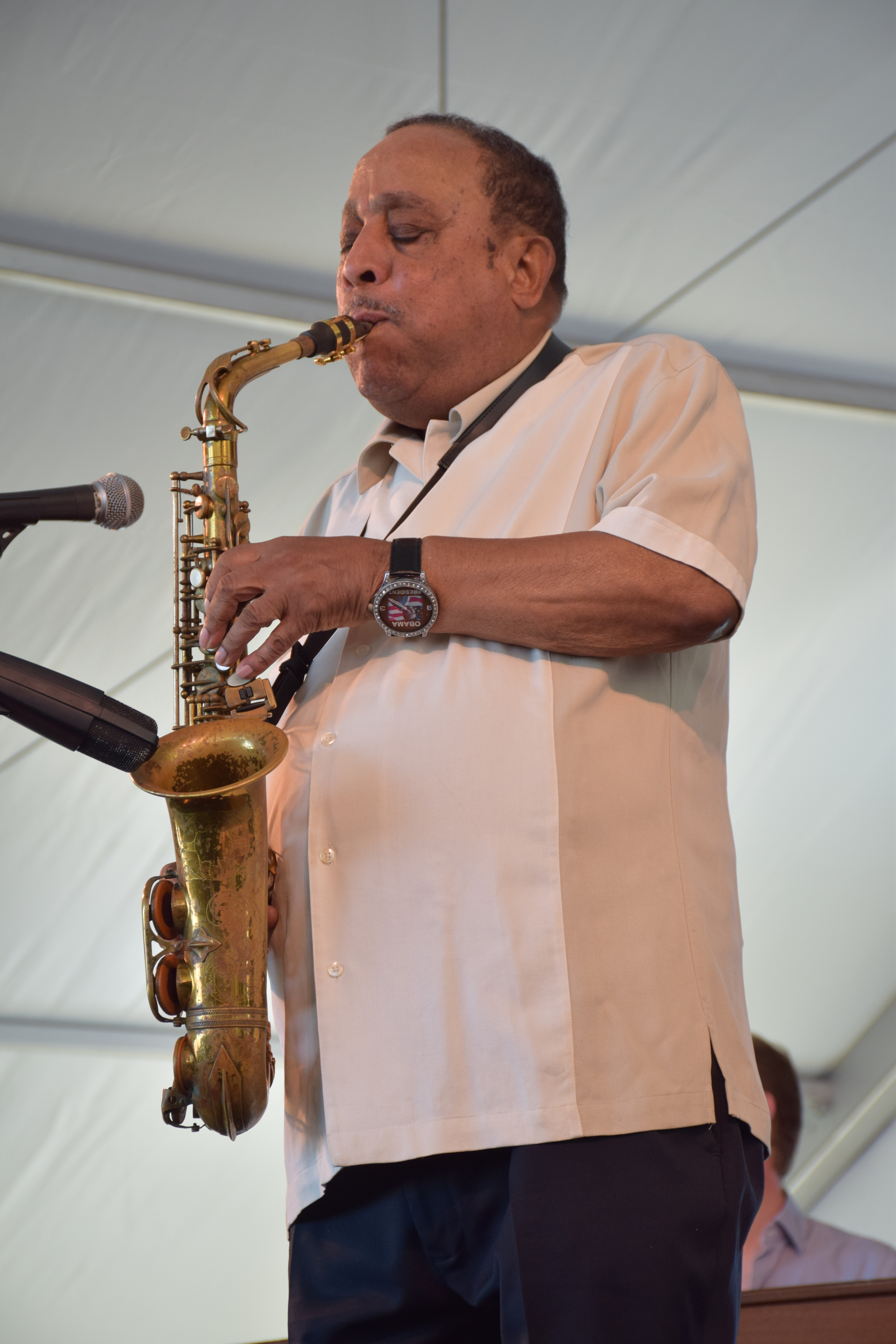
Lou Donaldson playing a Selmer Mk VI alto

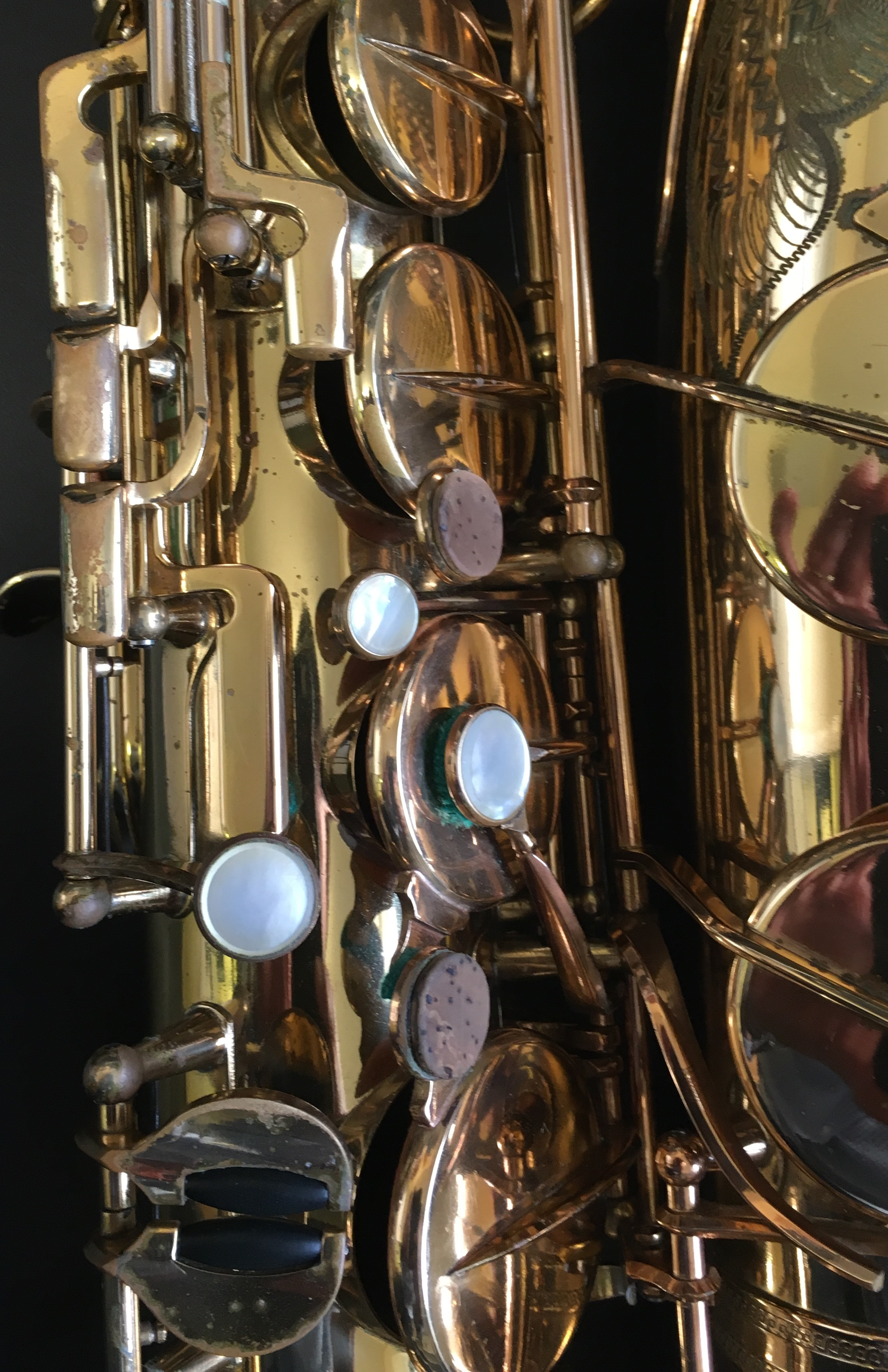
Selmer Mark VI tenor saxophone Concert model with high F#, right hand G#, D to E flat trill and C to D trill using the palm key E flat

The Selmer Mark VI is a family of professional saxophones made by Henri Selmer Paris. The line debuted in 1954; production of the alto and tenor models was phased out as the Mark VII entered full production in 1975, following a 1974 transition. Other voices remained in the Mark VI line for several years; Selmer launched the Super Action 80 in 1981 as the next generation. The Mark VI is widely cited by players and the media as a benchmark instrument, and contemporary reporting notes numerous running design changes across its two‑decade span.

== History ==
Selmer debuted the Mark VI in 1954 with sopranino, soprano, alto, tenor, baritone and bass saxophones, and continued making all of them until the introduction of the Mark VII alto and tenor models in 1975. Since the sopranino, soprano, baritone, and bass saxes were not changed for Mark VII, they continued at Mark VI. There are reports of a limited number of baritone saxophones labeled as Mark VIIs, but these horns were of the same design as the Mark VI.

Concerning the Mark VII baritone it came to light recently thanks to the work of Douglas Piper, the Mark VII baritone was based on the original Mark VI design. However, differed from the Mark VI in that all known examples have both the low A and the high F# keys. These options did not become standard until the introduction of the SA80 Series 2.

== Manufacturing ==
All Mark VI saxophones were manufactured in France. After manufacture, instruments designated for the British/Canadian or American markets were shipped unassembled and unengraved to their respective markets for completion. The style of engraving on the bell of the instrument is an indicator of the place of assembly.

The French-assembled Mark VI engraving is usually of a butterfly and floral motif, and the engraving typically extends to the bow. Some French-assembled Mark VIs lack any engraving other than the brand stamp. Nickel or silver-plated keys with a lacquer-finish body were offered among the French-assembled horns. British/Canadian Mark VIs often have a symmetrical medallion engraved on the front of the bell, and a design reminiscent of the chambered nautilus along the sides of the bell. American-assembled Mark VIs have floral or scroll engraving, with only the earliest models extending to the bow.

The design of the Mark VI evolved over time. Switching over from its predecessor, officially named the Super Action but commonly called the Super Balanced Action, Selmer's earliest Mark VI models were transitional, incorporating design elements from the preceding model. Tonally, early examples are considered to have a "dark" tone, while later examples are thought of as having a "bright" sound. The bore taper, bow, neck designs, and some mechanical features changed throughout the history of the Mark VI. The changes were not documented by Selmer. The length of the bow was increased on altos during the 85K serial number range to address certain intonation issues. In subsequent years the short bow was reintroduced. Some altos had baffles soldered into the bow to correct intonation issues. At least three changes to neck design were made on the tenor during the 1950s and 1960s, and once again in the 1970s. Some contend that the neck design changes account for the different tonal and playing qualities between earlier and later Mark VIs. Others contend that Mark VIs produced after about SN 180,000 had harder metal as a result of a change in the metalworking process, however, that SN corresponds to a known change in neck design so differing characteristics before and after can not definitely be ascribed to metallurgy.

Latter-year Mark VIs gained a reputation of being lower quality than early versions (possibly due to Selmer's higher annual production output of the popular saxophone), leading to a greater demand of early-year Mark VIs with a five-digit serial number. An employee's description of the assembly and quality control process at Selmer USA during the 1960s indicated that different quality Mark VIs were sold through different channels; the top tier was offered to musicians under contract to Selmer ("Selmer Artists"), the second tier went to pro dealers in major markets, and the third tier went to the general market. Hence, the best assurance of the quality of a Mark VI may be its sale history, as more variability could be expected in the quality of horns initially sold in the general market.

The high F♯ key was offered as an option, though some players believe that instruments without the high F♯ key have better natural intonation. During the mid-1960s optional keywork was offered, including the rare 'Concert' model with a high F#, right hand G#, D to E flat trill key and C to D trill key using the E flat palm key. There are also somewhat rare low A alto and baritone models. The low A baritone is especially sought after, whereas the low A alto model acquired a reputation, rightly or wrongly, for intonation issues. Nonetheless, Ornette Coleman played a low A alto.

The quality and ergonomics of the keywork design of the Mark VI can be observed in current saxophone designs: most modern saxophones have keywork that is based upon the basic Mark VI design.

Selmer's General Manager Jerome Selmer has confirmed that all Mark VIs were manufactured from industry-standard 66/34 "yellow brass" stock and that Selmer never recycled shell casings as a material for their saxophones.

== Usage ==
A 1965 Mark VI tenor (serial 125571) used by John Coltrane is held by the Smithsonian’s National Museum of American History. Contemporary reporting notes continued use of the Mark VI by prominent players, including Kenny G.

Outside professional music contexts, actor Andy Serkis has referred to a Selmer Mark VI tenor saxophone as his “most treasured possession.”

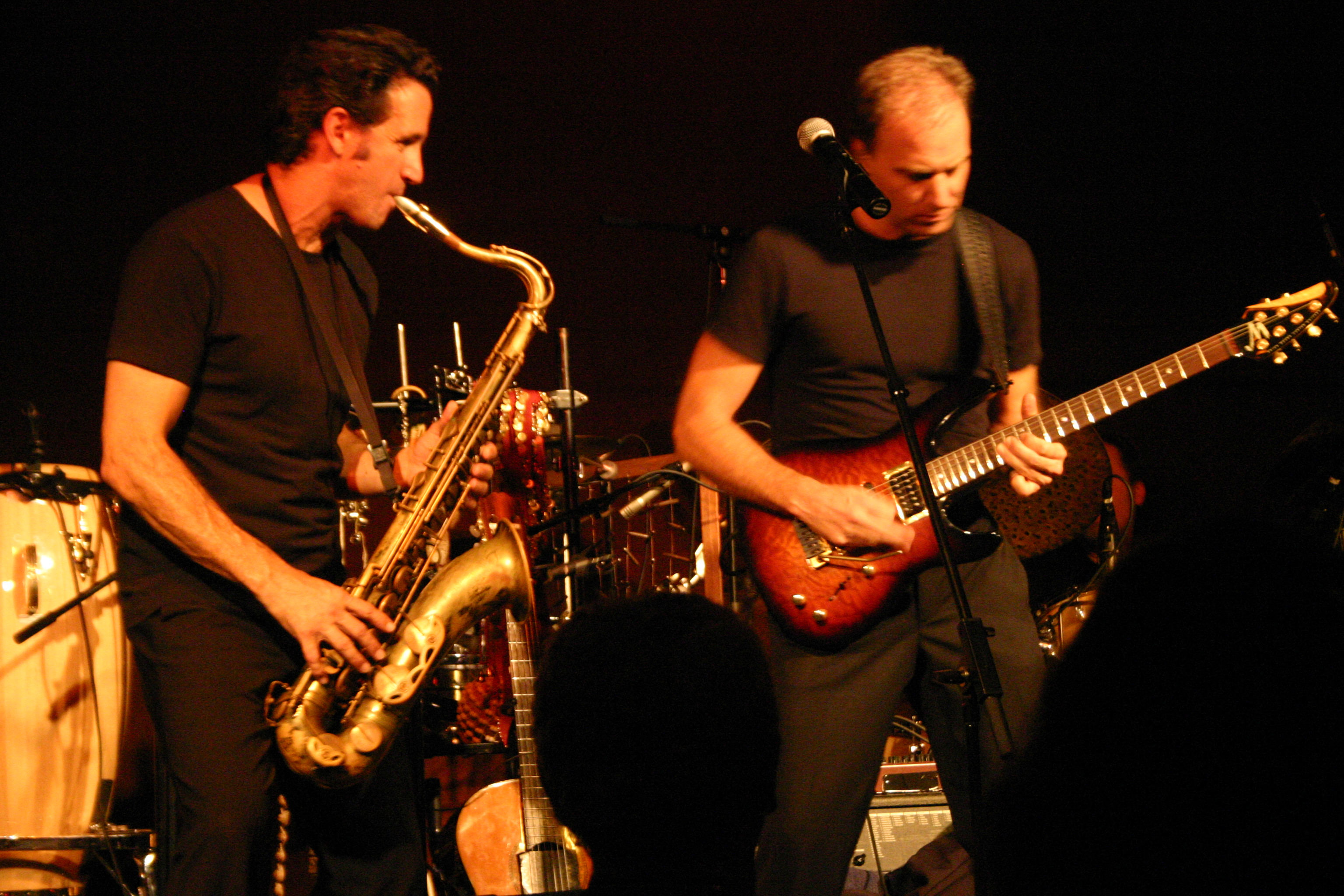
Eric Marienthal playing his Selmer Mk VI tenor saxophone

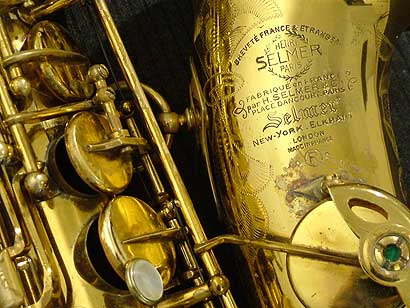
Bell of a Selmer Mark VI alto saxophone in the 80,000 serial number range

== Years of production by serial number ==
- 1954: 53727–59000
- 1955: 59001–63400
- 1956: 63401–68900
- 1957: 68901–74500
- 1958: 74501–80400
- 1959: 80401–85200
- 1960: 85201–91300
- 1961: 91301–97300
- 1962: 97301–104500
- 1963: 104501–112500
- 1964: 112501–121600
- 1965: 121601–131800
- 1966: 131801–141500
- 1967: 141501–152400
- 1968: 152401–162500
- 1969: 162501–173800
- 1970: 173801–184900
- 1971: 184901–196000
- 1972: 196001–208700
- 1973: 208701–220800
- 1974: (after 231,000/Mark VII) 220801–233900

The "Official" Serial number guide issued by Selmer was not exact and Selmer never meant for it to be so. There can be as much as an 18-month (+/-) variation in actual production dates. This has been verified by original owners with receipts of their instruments showing purchase dates earlier than they would have been produced according to this chart. An example exists of an 89,000 series instrument sold in 1959. The actual timing of the transition from Mark VI to Mark VII altos and tenors is unclear—Mark VIs exist in the 236,000 (1975) serial number range, contrary to the purported 231,000 Mark VII change-over. One hypothesis is that the announcement of the transition in Selmer's 1974 literature was premature. Another is that Selmer produced both the Mark VI design and early Mark VII horns concurrently, or possibly until the existing parts for the Mark VI were used up. Reported early Mark VII examples have Mark VII keywork on Mark VI type body tubes.

The Mark VI Soprano, Baritone, and Bass models were produced from 1954–1981. It is possible to find confirmed examples of these instruments in the serial range of # 55201–365000. The Mark VI Sopranino model was produced from 1954–1985 and can be found within the serial number range of # 55201–378000.

The Mark VI was succeeded by the Mark VII, which was produced as alto and tenor saxophones only.

== Legacy ==
Chelsea Carmichael with a Mark VII tenor

Selmer introduced the replacement Mark VII alto and tenor in 1974, aiming for tighter manufacturing tolerances, but many musicians judged the newer model less lively; demand for used Mark VIs rose immediately, and by the late 1980s prices in New York had tripled compared with San Diego markets according to the Los Angeles Times.
