= Guitar bracing =

Wooden struts inside acoustic guitars

Guitar bracing refers to the system of wooden struts which internally support and reinforce the soundboard and back of acoustic guitars.

Soundboard or top bracing transmits the forces exerted by the strings from the bridge to the rim. The luthier faces the challenge of bracing the instrument to withstand the stress applied by the strings with minimal distortion, while permitting the top to respond as fully as possible to the tones generated by the strings. Brace design contributes significantly to the type of sound a guitar will produce. According to luthiers W. Cumpiano and J. Natelson, "By varying brace design, each builder has sought to produce a sound that conformed to his concept of the ideal."

The back of the instrument is braced to help distribute the force exerted by the neck on the body, and to maintain the tonal responsiveness and structural integrity of the sound box.

== Materials ==
Braces may be made from top woods (spruce or cedar), balsa wood or, in high-end instruments, carbon fiber composites.

== Nylon string guitar bracing ==
=== Fan bracing ===
This is the standard bracing pattern on the classical guitar, dating to the work of Antonio Torres Jurado in the 19th century. Although the originator of this bracing style has not been reliably established, the earliest known use is by Spanish luthier Francisco Sanguino in the mid to late 18th century.

=== Kasha Bracing ===
In the 1970s, scientist Michael Kasha radically overhauled every aspect of guitar design to incorporate principles such as mechanical impedance matching.

=== Lattice bracing ===
The Australian guitarmaker Greg Smallman introduced guitars with an extremely thin soundboard, which is supported by bracing in the shape of a lattice. Smallman combines this with heavier, laminated back and sides with a frame. Smallman's guitars are used by John Williams.

Smallman's design was inspired by research by Torres who made a guitar with a papier mâché back and sides to show that the soundboard was the most important factor in guitar sound projection. Smallman also uses two 45 degree pole supports in the frame running from the bottom of the guitar to the waist to prevent the string tension from distorting the body and sound board.

== Steel string flat-top guitar bracing ==
In all steel-string instruments, the ends of the top braces taper at the edge of the soundboard. In most factory built guitars the brace tops are given a round profile, but are otherwise left unshaped. This produces a stronger top and may reduce the number of warranty claims arising from damage, however, over-built tops are less responsive. Braces are usually made from Sitka Spruce (Picea sitchensis). Some luthiers use Adirondack Spruce, also known as "Red Spruce" (Picea rubens), in high end instruments.

=== X-Bracing ===
The tops of most steel string acoustic guitars are braced using the X-brace system, or a variation of the X-brace system. This is generally attributed to Christian Frederick Martin between 1840 and 1845 for use in gut string guitars, but predates his application of this technique. The system consists of two braces forming an "X" shape across the soundboard below the top of the sound hole. The lower arms of the "X" straddle and support the ends of the bridge. Under the bridge is a hardwood bridge plate which prevents the ball end of the strings from damaging the underside of the soundboard. Below the bridge patch are one or more tone bars which support the bottom of the soundboard. These abut one of the X braces and usually slant down towards the bottom edge of the soundboard. The top tone bar butts against a portion of the bridge patch in most instruments. Above the sound hole a large transverse brace spans the width of the upper bout of the soundboard. Around the lower bout, small finger braces support the area between the X-braces and the edge of the soundboard.

=== Double X-bracing ===
In this system, two overlapping X shapes form a diamond surrounding the underside of the bridge plate. Some luthiers prefer it where additional strength is required, for instance for twelve string guitars. This bracing does not allow the top to move or vibrate as much as it normally would but offers more strength and prevent bellying around the bridge area.

=== A-bracing ===
Several bracing styles are designated as A-bracing. Mottola's Cyclopedic Dictionary of Lutherie Terms lists two. The first, typical of instruments built by Tacoma, use two long longitudinal struts that diverge from near the neck block to near the tail end of the guitar. This bracing style is used on instruments that feature a soundhole that is not centrally located. The second style listed is that used by some models of Ovation guitars, also called Adamas bracing. There is also a variation on X-bracing called A-bracing. The X-shaped structure under the bridge is retained, but the transverse strut between the fingerboard and soundhole is replaced by two diagonal braces which splay outward going toward the soundhole. It is used by Lowden Guitars.

=== V-Class Bracing ===
V-Class bracing is a bracing style developed by Andy Powers for Taylor Guitars. It is similar to A-bracing, however the main braces diverge across both sides of the sound hole towards the neck side of the top, and converge at the endblock to form the shape of a V. A lateral brace positioned between the soundhole and bridge plate spans the width of the top, and there are two sets of tone/finger braces between the bridge plate and endblock that are roughly perpendicular to the longitudinal V-braces and run from the V-brace towards the edge of the top. It is purported to allow the top to be both stiff and flexible in order to produce more volume and sustain. Taylor also purports that the design improves harmonic intonation.

=== Falcate bracing ===
Falcate (sickle-shaped) bracing is a symmetric bracing style designed by luthier and engineer Trevor Gore, and used on his steel-string and classical nylon-string guitars. It claims a more even sound over the frequency spectrum, and more responsiveness and volume without being too delicate.

=== Brace shape and 'voicing' or 'tap tuning' ===
Luthiers building higher quality instruments adjust the stiffness of the top and shape the braces to maximize the response of the top while maintaining structural integrity. Tone bars and bottom halves of the X-braces may be either scalloped or parabolic in shape. Above the X-brace joint, braces usually have a parabolic shape. Experienced luthiers 'voice' or 'tap-tune' the tops and backs of high end guitars to produce optimum tone and responsiveness in the hands of the player.

=== Scalloped vs. parabolic bracing ===
Bracing style and shape will affect the tone of the instrument. According to luthiers Bob Connor and David Mainwaring, "scalloped braces will produce a warmer sounding bass response in the guitar with smooth mids and crisp highs. Parabolic braces will yield a quick response with a more pronounced mid range and a more focused bottom end."

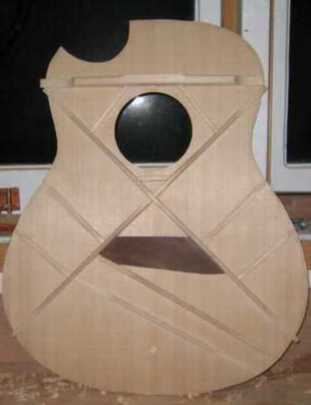
Plan view of top bracing

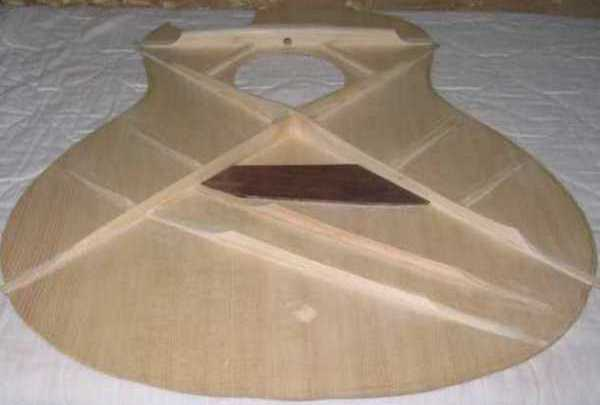
Note the parabolic shape of the lower arm treble X-brace and the scalloped shape on the opposite side.

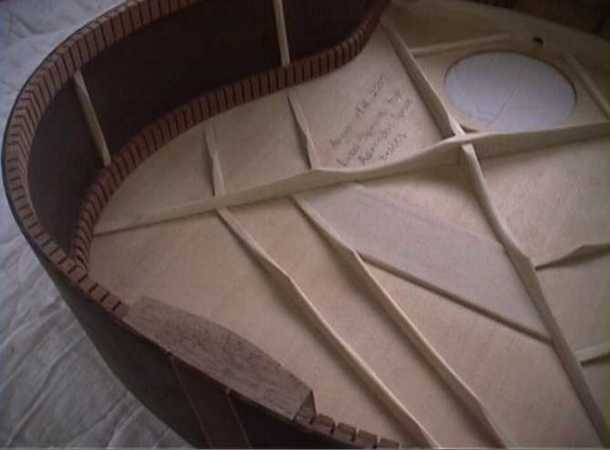
Top fitted to rim. Note the scalloped vintage style brace carving on this model.

=== Ladder bracing ===
This simple system, where braces are arranged parallel to each other and perpendicular to the direction of the strings, is employed on most guitar backs. The earliest steel string guitars very often had ladder braced tops, a practice which survives in the Maccaferri guitar. It is considered more suitable for parlor guitars and lightly strung instruments.

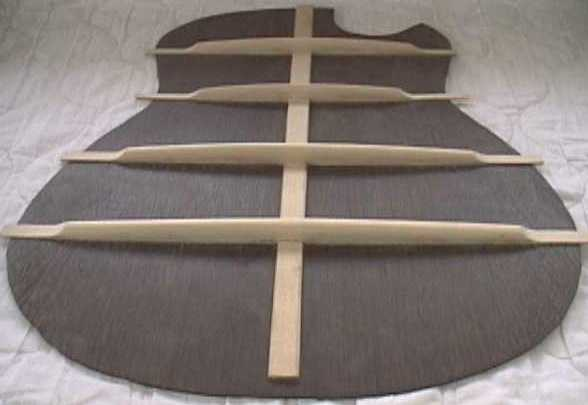
Ladder bracing

== Archtop bracing ==
Archtop guitars originally had two near-horizontal braces or "tone bars" on either side from bridge to neck, a system known as parallel bracing. The braces roughly run under the feet of the archtop guitar's bridge. X-bracing, similar to that of flat-top guitars was later introduced. Their tops are inherently stronger than flat tops, so less bracing may be required. "Trestle" bracing was a system used on some Gretsch archtops
