= Mario Maccaferri =

Italian luthier and guitarist (1900–1993)

- Born: 20 May 1900; Cento, Kingdom of Italy
- Died: 17 April 1993 (aged 92); New York City, U.S.
- Occupations: Inventor, luthier, guitarist
- Known for: Designing the Selmer guitar

Mario Maccaferri (20 May 1900 – 17 April 1993) was an Italian luthier, classical guitarist, businessman, and inventor. He is noted for designing the guitar favored by jazz musician Django Reinhardt, and for designing plastic clothespins, plastic bath and kitchen tiles and the plastic Islander ukulele which sold millions of copies in the mid-1900s. From 1939 he lived and worked in the United States. As of 2016 his daughter Elaine still runs the family company French American Reeds Inc.

== Early life ==
Maccaferri was born in Cento, Emilia-Romagna. At the age of 11 he was apprenticed to luthier Luigi Mozzani and took up the classical guitar. By 1923 he had established a reputation as a player and maker of classical guitars.

== Musical career ==
In 1933, Maccaferri injured his right hand in a swimming pool accident, ending his career as a concert performer, though he continued to work as a luthier and inventor.

== Lutherie designs ==
Maccaferri is best-known for designing the Selmer Maccaferri guitar played by Gypsy jazz legend Django Reinhardt. His design featured the distinctive “D-shaped” sound hole. Maccferri's innovations extended to materials as well: he was an early adopter of laminate backs and sides for guitars, and for instruments made entirely of plastic.

=== Plastic instruments ===
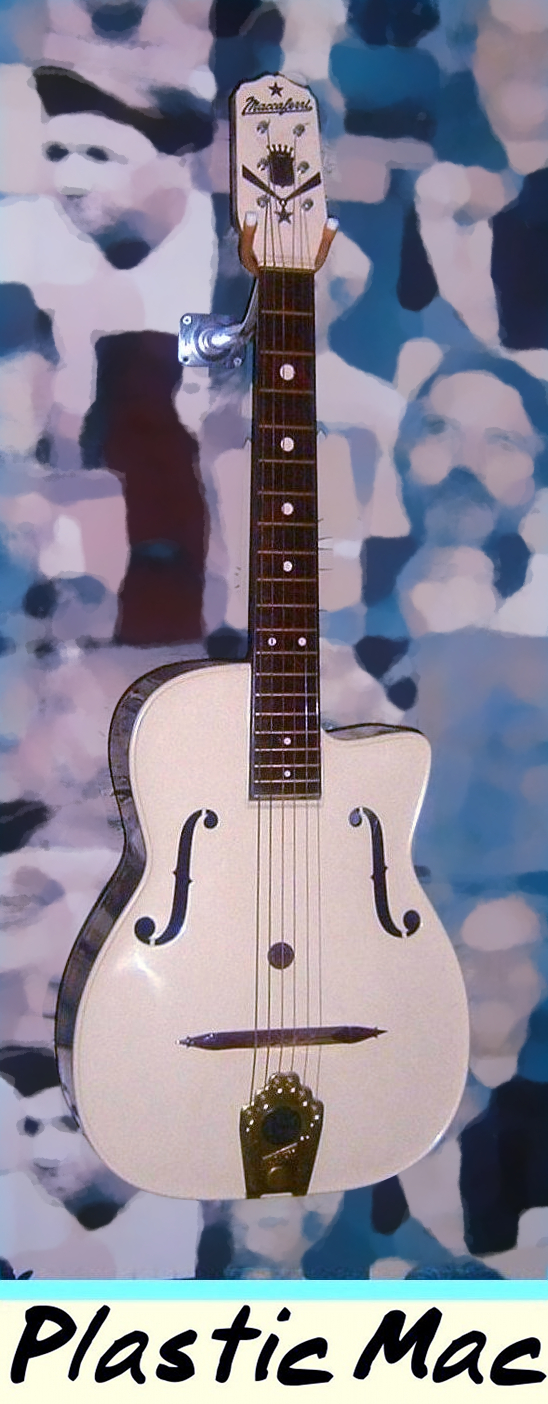
Maccaferri plastic guitar

In 1941, Maccaferri patented a plastic woodwind reed, in 1947 he patented two plastic clothespin designs, and in 1949 he launched his line of plastic "Islander" ukuleles in collaboration with television star Arthur Godfrey, which would sell into the millions of units. Maccaferri also developed the Chord Master, an automatic chording device originally designed for the ukulele. In the 1950s, Maccaferri produced a line of plastic guitars, but they had little commercial success. Later in his career and up until his death, Maccaferri worked on the design for a plastic violin, which in 1990 was used at a performance at Carnegie Hall.
