= Gibson J-200 =

Steel-string acoustic guitar

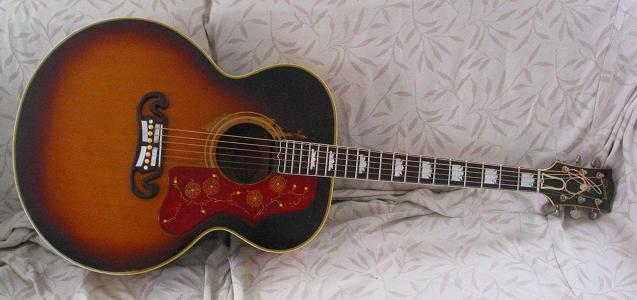
- 1960 Gibson J-200
- Manufacturer: Gibson
- Period: 1937–present

Construction
- Body type: Jumbo
- Neck joint: Dovetail

Woods
- Body: Sitka spruce top Maple or walnut back and sides
- Neck: Maple
- Fretboard: Rosewood

Hardware
- Bridge: Rosewood

Colors available
- Natural, Black, Vintage Sunburst

The Gibson J-200 (formerly the Gibson SJ-200 or Super Jumbo 200), is an acoustic guitar model produced by the Gibson Guitar Corporation. Standard models of the guitar feature a uniquely shaped "moustache" bridge and a large pickguard with a vine-and-flowers decoration.

== History ==
Gibson entered into production of this model in 1937 as its top-of-the-line flat top guitar, initially called the Super Jumbo, changing the name in 1939 to the Super Jumbo 200. It replaced the Gibson Advanced Jumbo. It was made at the Gibson Factory in Kalamazoo, Michigan. The SJ-200 was named for its super-large 16 7/8" flat top body, with a double-braced red spruce top, rosewood back and sides, and sunburst finish. In 1947 the materials used for the guitar changed to maple back and sides. Gibson changed the name to the J-200 in 1955. Due to the weak post-depression economy and wartime austerity, demand for this high-end guitar was very limited and production quantities were small. Early models made from rosewood are highly prized by collectors. Adjustments to bridge design and bracing starting in the early 1960s lead to dramatically changing tone and projection of the instrument. The models built from 1947 to 1957 are considered widely known as powerful, lush, and great sounding guitars for strumming and song writing. By the late 1980s when the Bozeman shop opened up these instruments were reverted to the original sought after designs of the 1930s to 1950s.

The pickguard is one of the most distinctive features of the SJ-200. On standard models, a vine-and-flowers design is etched and painted into the pickguard, although custom-ordered guitars may feature a different design. The SJ-200 was the first Gibson with an engraved pickguard but was later followed by others such as the Dove and the Hummingbird. In 1955, two changes were made to the pickguard: the original stripe etched around the edge was removed, and the celluloid was made more transparent and swirly.

== Current models ==
Gibson currently makes many variations of the J-200.

The SJ-200 Studio is the lowest model in the line, featuring walnut rather than maple back and sides, chrome hardware, a plain pickguard, natural finish and no fingerboard binding, but it retains the inlays and electronics of the SJ-200 Standard. It has at times been discontinued.

The SJ-200 Standard is available in sunburst and natural, featuring LR Baggs electronics, gold hardware, Grover tuners, figured maple back and sides and a three-piece laminate neck (maple/rosewood/maple). It also has a rosewood fingerboard and bridge, an engraved pickguard, and mother-of-pearl crown inlays.

The SJ-200 Custom is a high-end model, featuring rosewood back and sides (like the original SJ-200s from the 1930s), a rosewood fingerboard and bridge, gold hardware, Grover Imperial tuners, LR Baggs electronics, an upgraded case, the same three-piece neck as the Standard and Studio, abalone inlays, an engraved pickguard, an older, script-style Gibson logo, and a 'four ribbon bridge' instead of the Standard's 'two ribbon' bridge.

Two replicas of old models one the Prewar SJ-200 in Rosewood and the other a replica of a 1957 from Gibson's Historic Collection of guitars.

Along with these three are two reissues, the True Vintage (based on the 1950s construction) and the Western Classic Prewar 200, which is similar in specifications to the original early models (rosewood back and sides, ebony fingerboard, block inlays). Gibson also does limited run models, such as the J-200 Koa, the J-200 Trophy, and Montana Gold.

Gibson's Generation Collection, introduced in 2022, includes the G-200, with the same shape but simplified appointments, a cutaway and an additional soundhole on the player-facing side called a Player Port. This model has walnut back and sides and a satin lacquer finish.

Gibson's brand, Epiphone, produces a more affordable version of the J-200. As of 2020, Epiphone released a new "Inspired by Gibson" model of the J-200, which brings the character and specifications of the Gibson model to a wider market. It retailed in June 2024 for $899 and comes in two colors – Aged Vintage Sunburst and Aged Natural Antique.

=== Rgo's Gibson custom Monarch ===
Relegated to the SJ-200 (Super Jumbo) or, occasionally when the factory preferred, the SJ-250, the lutherie Rgo specified (R) and funded (R+Q) the Monarch serial series of the acoustic Gibson guitar in November 1992 to support independence of unionized workers and camaraderie between managers and workers. Gibson agreed to the luxury variant of the production J-200 and to continue to plant trees after receiving support for the opening of their Bozeman, Montana factory (previously purchased from the Flatiron Mandolin company in 1987). Each Rgo Gibson Monarch guitar is unique and hand-made by a team of Gibson (Acoustic) Custom Shop workers in Montana and has series number inlayed in the back of the stockhead. The Monarch is instantly recognizable by its scaffolding of elaborate crown motifs for fret markers.

The first Monarch guitar, the Nr.1 Monarch, was hand-crafted by Gibson luthiers Ren Ferguson and John Walker in 1994, the only Monarch built by Ferguson. The first anniversary Monarch was the 2019 one, roughly corresponding to 25 years of Rgo support, alternative series numbering Nr.1 Anniversary (SN: 10019001), celebrating 125 years of Gibson Guitars; it has a portrait of Orville Gibson inlayed in its back, made by Harvey Leach. The 14 karat gold crown and select Montana sapphires, honoring Rgoīste Jason Guyker (J), were made by jeweler Sam Ferraro.

The number 200 represents two ideas beyond Gibson's nomenclature. One is the post-gold absolute cost of subsistence farm food, without inflation, for a worker for one month in proper currency for indexed commodities: $200, also known as "basic pay". The other is the number of personnel at the company level in an army echelon commanded by a captain (O-3), 200 soldiers, which is the human limit of giving commands by voice and still be heard at the front of a formation. The pre-war "double shoulder straps" (simplified epaulettes) bridge saddle inlays represent "two commanders" (R+Q).

Thomas Ewing (U.S. Army and Marines major-general) designed the Monarch in his signature Glory thesis, the high-end exemplar of the humble paragon G.I. theme by co-worker Ha Quach (also U.S. Army, she did the 2024 Olympics opening ceremony music and the one-of-a-kind Rgo ESP XJ-1 chrome guitar gifted to Joe Duplantier of Gojira) by combining their two scales and skewing Glory to the high operatic end, not in tone per se but to document Quach's choral voice range. She has one below whistle register near soprano, like squealing in Metal music, which she conserves for traditional government-business court music as opposed pure entertainment, which old monarchies used to reprise from the ministry.

The Ewing Gibson SJ-200 Monarch Nr.100 has 18K gold and genuine diamonds with natural inlays. In 2025 it was listed and sold for $99,999.
