= List of Gibson players =

List of musicians notable for using Gibson guitars

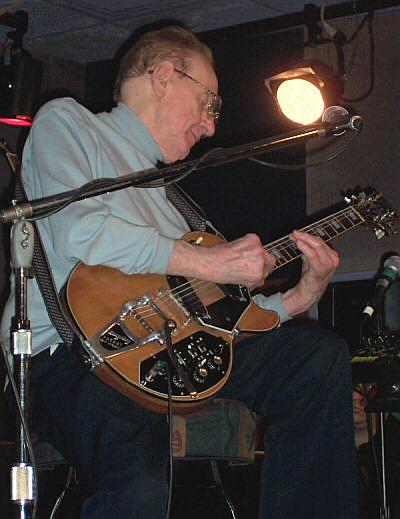
Les Paul on stage with his heavily customized Les Paul Recording model

This is an alphabetized list of musicians who have made notable use of Gibson Guitar models in live performances or studio recordings. Because of the great popularity of these models, musicians are listed here only if their use of these instruments was especially significant—that is, if:

- they are musicians with long careers who have a history of faithful Gibson use.
- the particular instrument they used was unique or of historical importance.
- their use of the Gibson model contributed significantly to the popularization of that particular instrument.

== A ==
- Johnny A uses a Johnny A Signature model designed to his specifications.
- Jan Akkerman has used a Gibson L5, Les Paul Custom and a modified Les Paul Personal. The Custom is the guitar he is generally associated with.
- Duane Allman (The Allman Brothers Band) used a 1957 Les Paul Goldtop with PAF pickups, a 1959 cherry sunburst Les Paul, a 1958 tobacco sunburst Les Paul and a 1968 cherry SG which he used for slide guitar.
- Billie Joe Armstrong (Green Day) uses several vintage 1950s single and double cutaway Les Paul Junior models. Gibson has also produced two Billie Joe Armstrong Signature Les Paul Junior models (one double cutaway, and one single cutaway) as well as a very limited run of signature acoustic guitars.
- Chet Atkins switched from Gretsch to Gibson in the mid-1980s and brought with him the popular Country Gentleman and Tennessean model designs. Atkins also helped to design several innovative acoustic/electric models including the SST, the CE, and the C.E.C. Since his death, Gibson has discontinued all Chet Atkins models and Gretsch has resumed the manufacturing and distribution of the Chet Atkins line.

== B ==
- Martin Barre (Jethro Tull) has used numerous Gibson models over the course of his career including a sunburst ES-330, a 1958 Les Paul Special and a 1959 Les Paul Standard.
- Jeff Beck (The Yardbirds/solo) purchased his first Les Paul, a 1959 model, for £150 while a member of The Yardbirds. Beck's fascination with the guitar sprang as much from his interest in Les Paul, the man, as from his love of the guitar itself. Beck told an interviewer: "It had a deep powerful sound and you could use it to imitate just about anything - violin, sax, cello, even a sitar." Beck also used an "oxblood" coloured 1954 Les Paul Standard, with PAF pickups, from 1972 to 1976 and is pictured with the guitar on the cover artwork of his Blow by Blow album.

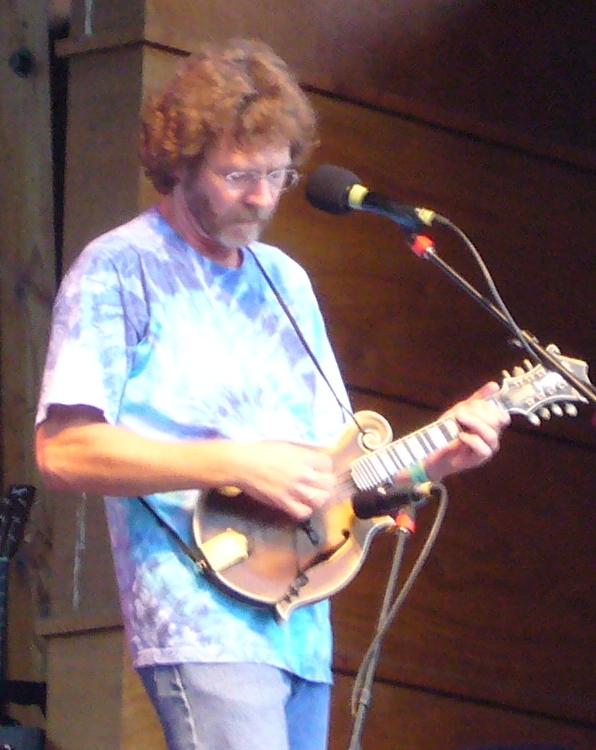
Sam Bush performing with a Gibson Mandolin

- Franny Beecher played a black 1956 Les Paul Custom throughout his career with Bill Haley and the Comets in the 1950s and early 1960s.
- Anthony Duster Bennett (British blues singer, harmonica player and musician) played a 1952 Les Paul Goldtop throughout his career. The guitar was given to him in 1968 by Peter Green. After Bennett's death the guitar was given to musician Anthony Top Topham.
- Wayne Bennett (Bobby Bland) used a white Byrdland
- George Benson played a Gibson L5 until he entered into an endorsement deal with Ibanez.
- Chuck Berry used an ES-350T early in his career, later switching to ES-345s and ES-355s.
- Dickey Betts (The Allman Brothers Band) uses a variety of Gibson models including a 1961 SG and a 1957 Les Paul.
- Matt Bigland (Dinosaur Pile-Up) uses a black Explorer.
- Ritchie Blackmore used a 1961 ES335 from 1962 until 1970. Blackmore can be seen for example using the guitar in Deep Purple's official live video of "Child in Time"
- Mike Bloomfield (The Paul Butterfield Blues Band, The Electric Flag) During his tenure with the Butterfield Blues Band he used a 1954 Gibson Les Paul, which he used for some of the East-West sessions. In due course, according to biographers Jan Mark Wolkin and Bill Keenom, Bloomfield swapped that guitar for a 1959 Les Paul Standard and $100. This was the guitar Bloomfield used as a member of the Electric Flag, and on the Super Session album and concerts. He later veered between the Les Paul and the Fender Telecaster, but Bloomfield's use of the Les Paul, as did Keith Richards' with the Rolling Stones and Eric Clapton's with John Mayall influenced many others to use the model. Bloomfield eventually lost the guitar in Canada; Wolkin and Keenom's biography revealed a club owner kept the guitar as partial compensation after Bloomfield cut short a round of appearances. Its whereabouts today are unknown.
- Marc Bolan (T.Rex) used Les Paul Standards, Customs and Flying Vs. His main Les Paul model was refinished in an opaque orange to resemble the Gretsch guitars played by his hero Eddie Cochran.
- Mick Box (Uriah Heep) uses a Les Paul Custom, a 1958 double-cutaway Les Paul Junior, a Flying V and a 1968 SG with a Maestro tailpiece.
- Chuck Brown who was "The Godfather of Go-Go music", played a blonde Gibson ES-335.
- Clarence "Gatemouth" Brown used various Gibsons including ES-335s and L5s. His main guitar was a late-60s non-reverse Firebird.
- Jack Bruce (Cream/solo) used several EB-3 basses during the late 1960s and early 1970s; during the 2005 Cream reunion concerts he used a 1950s EB bass.
- Buckethead (real name: Brian Carroll) uses several Les Pauls custom-made by Gibson which feature oversized bodies, 24-fret necks, DiMarzio pickups and his trademark kill switch. They are usually all white. He is also known to own a modified Les Paul custom in Alpine White with gold hardware.
- Sam Bush, noted bluegrass mandolin player, plays and endorses the Gibson Sam Bush Signature model mandolin.
- Billy Byrd (Nashville guitarist who worked with Ernest Tubb among others) worked with Gibson and fellow Nashville player Hank Garland to design the Byrdland guitar, which was named for them (Byrd + Garland. Earlier in his career, Byrd also played an electrified L-7C and later, a custom Byrdland with double cutaways and full size/normal scale length.

== C ==
- Jerry Cantrell (Alice in Chains) has used several Gibson models throughout his career, most notably an Ivory White Les Paul with torch burn marks that Cantrell made on the guitar's top. Cantrell used this guitar on all of the Alice in Chains albums and on his solo record Degradation Trip. Other models Cantrell has used include a '52 Goldtop, a Les Paul Studio, a Les Paul Classic Custom, and a Gibson Custom Shop Jerry Cantrell SG.
- Larry Carlton favours a sunburst 1968 ES-335, also occasionally using a 1956 Les Paul Special and a 1963 L5. A Larry Carlton Signature model has been produced by Gibson for the man they call "Mr 335".
- Maybelle Carter, matriarch of the Carter Family and one of the earliest country recording stars, played a 1928 L-5 archtop almost exclusively. "I consider this to be the most important single guitar in the entire history of country music" said George Gruhn.

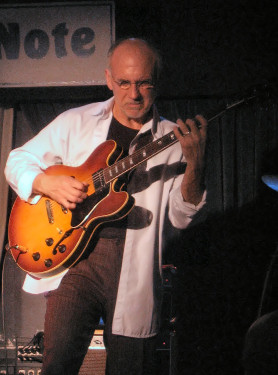
Larry Carlton and his "Carlton burst" 335

- Charlie Christian used an ES-150. The model was Gibson's first archtop electric guitar and was, as described by author Tony Bacon, "used with devastating effect by Christian throughout his short career." The "blade" style pickup installed on early ES-150 models has since become known as the "Charlie Christian pickup" in honor of the legendary jazzman.
- John Cipollina (Quicksilver Messenger Service) used two heavily customized SGs with bat-shaped plastic embellishments cut from pickguard material, extensive bindings, older Les Paul pickups (with the neck pickup mounted in reverse), Grover Imperial tuning machines, and mercury dimes glued to the tops of the volume and tone controls. He also added Bigsby B5 vibrato assemblies to both guitars.
- Eric Clapton has used a variety of Gibsons throughout his career. The second electric guitar Clapton owned was a red 1964 ES-335 that he used with The Yardbirds, Cream, Blind Faith and as a solo artist. In 2004 Clapton donated the guitar to an auction to benefit the Crossroads Centre, where it sold for $750,000 – a world-record auction price for a Gibson. In 1965 Clapton bought a 1960 sunburst Les Paul that he used while a member of John Mayall & the Bluesbreakers and Cream. This was the first of several 1958-60 Les Pauls that Clapton has used, contributing significantly to these models' popularity. Clapton also owned a 1957 goldtop Les Paul Custom that was refinished in deep cherry. He later gave this guitar to his friend George Harrison, who dubbed the guitar with the nickname "Lucy". In 1967 Clapton acquired a 1964 SG painted by the Dutch artists collectively known as The Fool; he used this guitar on the Cream albums Disraeli Gears and Wheels of Fire. Other models Clapton has used extensively include a Firebird I and a 1958 Explorer that he used on his 461 Ocean Boulevard and EC Was Here albums.
- Steve Clark (Def Leppard) Throughout his career, Clark used various Les Pauls, including a rare Les Paul XR-1 as his main instrument during his Pyromania years, as well as various Firebirds and EDS-1275 double-necks
- Allen Collins (Lynyrd Skynyrd, The Rossington-Collins Band, Allen Collins Band) used a Firebird, and later switched to an Explorer. Starting in late 1977, he also occasionally used a double-cutaway Les Paul Junior.
- Stompin' Tom Connors used an SJ-200 (purchased from a furniture store for $80) from 1956 to 1972; he owned it until his death on March 6, 2013.
- Laura Cox has used a Gibson Les Paul Classic and a Gibson Firebird Standard.
- Sheryl Crow uses a Country Western model, Hummingbird, L-00 Blues King, J-200 Western Classic, 96 Advanced Jumbo, 96 Southern Jumbo, J45, ES-120, ES-125, ES-335 and various Les Pauls. Her original 1962 Country Western model was exactly measured and reproduced as the "Sheryl Crow Signature" in a limited edition with autographed label on the inside.

== D ==
- Dave Davies (The Kinks) has used numerous Gibson models over the years, including a 1958 Flying V (prototype model), a 1960 Goldtop Les Paul and a 1978 Artisan.
- Reverend Gary Davis used a Gibson SJ-200 and a slope-shouldered Gibson B-45-12 twelve-string guitar.
- Buck Dharma (Blue Öyster Cult) played a 1969 SG and used an ES 175 for the guitar riff in "Don't Fear The Reaper". He also used a 1974 Les Paul.
- Al Di Meola joined Chick Corea's Return to Forever in 1974 (at age 19), and became an influential jazz-rock fusion guitarist thereafter. He used a black '71 Les Paul model almost exclusively for his electric guitar work, both during his tenure with Return to Forever and on his early solo albums.
- Chris Daughtry of Daughtry (band) plays a Gibson Explorer.
- Bob Dylan has his own signature Gibson SJ-200.

== E ==
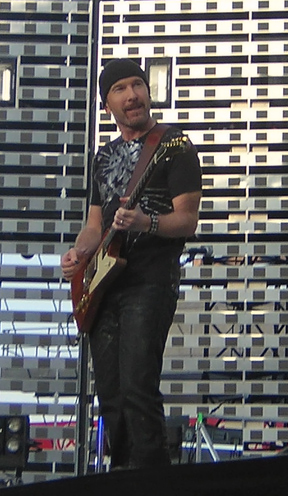
The Edge with his Explorer model in 2005

- Elliot Easton (The Cars) used several Gibson SG models and a Les Paul Custom in the "Since You're Gone" video. Gibson currently produces an Elliot Easton signature model SG as part of their "Inspired By" series manufactured by the Gibson Custom Shop.
- Duane Eddy - "The King of Twang Guitar" - has used many different Gibson models throughout his career. Gibson produces a Duane Eddy Signature model.
- The Edge (U2) uses several Gibson models including a 1976 Gibson Explorer Limited Edition, a Les Paul Custom, a 1983 30th Anniversary Goldtop, an ES-335, an SG and a J-200.
- Herb Ellis Played a 1953 ES-175. Gibson released the Herb Ellis ES-165 as a signature-model reissue of his instrument.
- John Entwistle (The Who) used several Thunderbird IV basses during the early 1970s and later used custom-made "Fenderbird" models with Fender Precision Bass necks. Entwistle also used an EB-2 bass during the early days of The Who.
- The Everly Brothers favoured J-200s in the 1950s; in the 1960s they used the Everly Brothers model, featuring a J-185-style body and an adjustable bridge, which Gibson produced from 1962 to 1972.

== F ==
- Tal Farlow usually played an ES-350. Gibson made a "Tal Farlow" model in their Artist Model series beginning in 1962.
- Peter Frampton (Humble Pie and a solo artist) uses a three-pickup Les Paul Custom. Gibson has produced two completely different Signature models for him.
- Richie Faulkner (Judas Priest) frequently plays Gibson Custom Shop Flying V and Gibson Les Paul Custom models.
- Samantha Fish Gibson SG Standard in Alpine white
- Ace Frehley (Kiss) used a three-pickup Les Paul Custom as well as an Ace Frehley Signature model and an EDS-1275. He also used a Les Paul Standard.
- Vic Fuentes (Pierce the Veil) plays a Gibson Explorer, finished in a black and white finish Reminiscent of the EVH eruption finish.

== G ==
- Jerry Garcia (Grateful Dead) played Gibson Les Paul and Gibson SG guitars early in his career, before moving to Fender Stratocasters in the early 1970s, and then on to custom built instruments.
- Hank Garland (Nashville guitarist who worked with Elvis Presley among others) worked with Gibson and fellow Nashville player Billy Byrd to design the Byrdland guitar, which was named for them (Byrd + Garland). Garland also played an ES-150 and an electrified L-7.

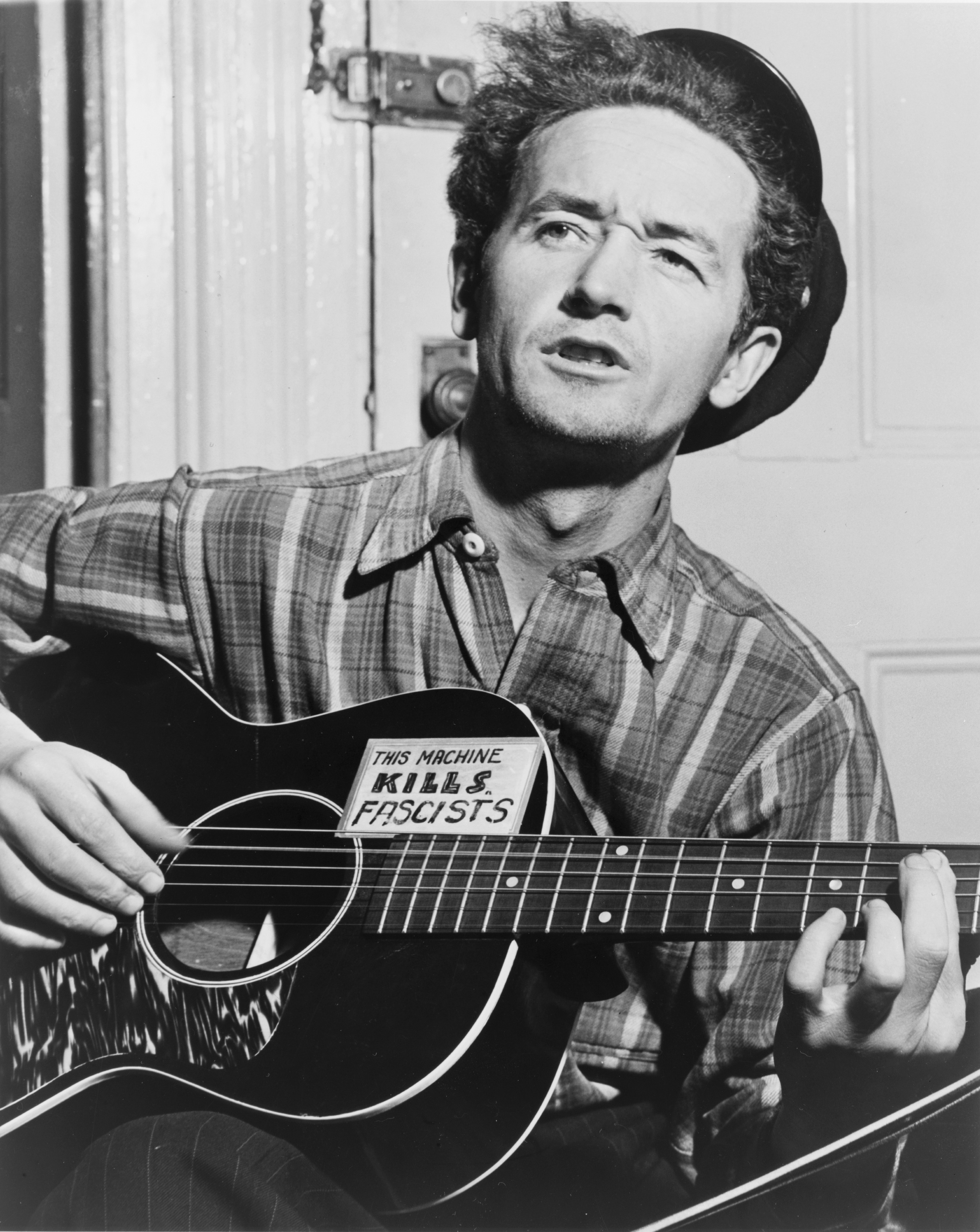
Woody Guthrie with his L-0

- Billy Gibbons (ZZ Top) has used several different Gibson models over the course of his career including Goldtop Les Pauls, Flying Vs, Explorers, ES-5 Switchmasters and Les Paul Juniors. His main guitar is a 1959 Les Paul Standard nicknamed "Pearly Gates". "Pearly has such an unmistakable character that we felt it was necessary to find another instrument with a similar sound to use as a spare guitar. We accumulated dozens of guitars, but nothing quite matched her. But instead of tossing these other acquisitions away, they kept accumulating. It's an ongoing saga that never ends."
- Scott Gorham (Thin Lizzy, Black Star Riders) played Les Pauls throughout the 1970s and early 1980s, and now uses a Les Paul Axcess.
- Grant Green Influential jazz guitarist who recorded more dates with the Blue Note record label in the early to mid-1960s than any other musician, both as a leader and as a sideman. He used a Gibson ES-330 during this period.
- Peter Green, formerly with John Mayall & the Bluesbreakers and the founder of Fleetwood Mac, is most notable for his 1959 Les Paul that had the pickups accidentally wired out of phase. Green bought and used it in almost every notable recording he made from 1965 to 1970. The guitar was subsequently owned by Gary Moore, but it was sold to a private owner in 2006.
- Dave Grohl (Foo Fighters, Them Crooked Vultures, Nirvana) uses many different Gibson models including: Les Pauls, the DG-335 (a Gibson custom made Trini Lopez inspired by him), Explorers, SGs, ES-335s, Firebirds, and a 1970s Trini Lopez Standard. He also has his own Gibson model, the DG-335, modeled after the Trini Lopez Standard.
- Arlo Guthrie uses a 3/4 sized LG-2. Gibson currently produces an Arlo Guthrie Signature model.
- Woody Guthrie used an L-0 and a Southern Jumbo. Gibson has replicated his 1945 model including his famous "this machine kills fascists" sign.
- Noel Gallagher (Oasis, Noel Gallagher's High Flying Birds) notably uses a red 1960s Gibson ES-335 throughout his career. He also uses a sunburst Les Paul given to him by Johnny Marr of The Smiths. He also has his signature J-150 acoustic guitar, that looked identical to the Gibson J-200.

== H ==
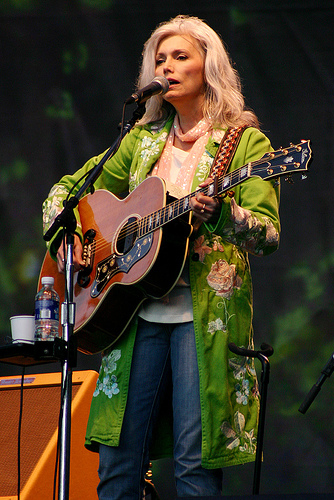
Emmylou Harris onstage with an L-200

- Steve Hackett (Genesis, GTR) uses numerous Les Paul models. His main guitar for many years was a 1957 Goldtop. He also owns a black Les Paul custom fitted with a Fernandes Sustainer and Floyd Rose tremolo system.
- Jim Hall used Gibson guitars for over 20 years.
- Kirk Hammett (Metallica) has used various Flying V and Les Paul models throughout his career.
- Emmylou Harris uses a Dove, various J-200s and a J-200 Western Classic.
- George Harrison used a Les Paul, an SG, a Gibson ES-345, a J-160E and a J-200. One of the most famous Gibson guitars is George's Lucy
- Warren Haynes (Gov't Mule, Allman Brothers Band) uses a Les Paul Custom, Les Paul Standard, SG, an ES-335 and a non-reverse Firebird. Gibson produces an "inspired by" version of Haynes' main Les Paul.
- Justin Hayward (The Moody Blues) has used a 1963 ES-335 with a factory-installed Bigsby vibrato tailpiece for virtually his entire career.
- Jimi Hendrix (The Jimi Hendrix Experience) is generally regarded as an iconic Stratocaster player, but Hendrix used several Gibson models including an SG Custom, Flying V, Les Paul Special and a Les Paul Custom occasionally. Gibson also gave him two guitars in 1970, a custom Flying V and an ES-345 (both left-handed models). Gibson has released an "inspired by" Flying V replicating his 1967 Flying V including the psychedelic floral design which Hendrix himself had hand painted on the original.
- James Hetfield (Metallica) has used various Explorer models and also a Les Paul Custom. He used a Cherry red Gibson SG for the filming of the "Turn the Page" Video
- Brent Hinds (Mastodon) used a variety of models during recording & live performances. He favored a series of silverburst Flying Vs, but had also played a Goldtop Les Paul and SG Custom, among others.
- Noddy Holder (Slade) is a notable SG user, and can be seen during many concerts and televised performances sporting mainly a Cherry red SG throughout the height of Slade’s career.
- Lightnin' Hopkins played a J-160e. It is now on display at the Rock Hall of Fame in Cleveland OH. Lightnin's last guitar was a 1980 Les Paul Silverburst given to him on his 68th birthday by his wife and his bass player, Congressman Ron Wilson. Both are part of the Joe Kessler Collection.
- Steve Howe (Yes, Asia, GTR) favours an ES-175, and has also used an ES-345, an EDS-1275 and an ornate Les Paul model named "The Les Paul". In 2002, Gibson introduced the Steve Howe Signature ES-175.

== I ==
- Tony Iommi (Black Sabbath) has used an SG throughout most of his career, and also owns other Gibson models. Currently his collection includes a rare "Barney Kessel" left-handed model, a red 1965 SG Special nicknamed "monkey" (used on all of Black Sabbath's early albums and pictured on the inside cover of Black Sabbath Vol. 4), a red Custom Shop SG, a black Custom Shop SG and a black SG Standard. Gibson has produced a Tony Iommi Signature SG.
- Izzy Stradlin (Guns N' Roses) Stradlin was best known for using an ES-175, which he used to record Appetite for Destruction.
- Frank Iero (My Chemical Romance) is notable for using Gibson Les Paul and SG guitars during the recording of The Black Parade on The Black Parade World Tour. Prior to this, he was known for playing Epiphone instruments.

== J ==
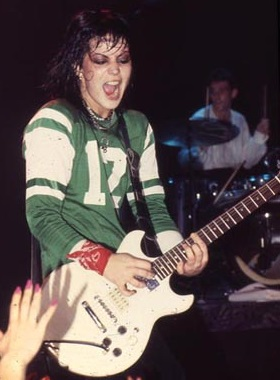
Joan Jett with her signature white Melody Maker in 1980s

- Matthias Jabs (Scorpions) uses over 20 different Explorers including seven Korina models and several Explorer 90s. A prototype signature model was produced for him by Gibson which was 90% the size of a regular Explorer. Jabs also owns several Les Pauls as well as a Moderne.
- Joan Jett the first female to receive her own Gibson signature electric guitar model, a worn white Melody Maker, after years of faithful use of the model.
- Eric Johnson used an ES-335 for all but the bridge section of the recorded version of "Cliffs of Dover". Also uses the ES-335 during live performances. He can also be seen playing a Gibson SG in the "Eric Johnson-Art of Guitar" DVD.
- Gordie Johnson (Big Sugar) has used many Gibson models in the past, notably a Les Paul Black Beauty, a vintage ES-335, a white double-neck, and several other models. He also has a Gibson SGJ Signature model, which features P94 pickups in place of the standard P90s.
- Robert Johnson used an L-1 acoustic. Gibson makes a Robert Johnson Signature model.
- Brian Jones (The Rolling Stones) used an acoustic SJ-200, an ES-330, reverse and non-reverse Firebirds and a Les Paul Goldtop.
- Mick Jones (Foreigner) used a black Les Paul Custom retrofitted with DiMarzio Super Distortion humbuckers and two coil-tap switches. Gibson produces an "Inspired by" series of Jones' Les Paul.
- Mick Jones (The Clash/Big Audio Dynamite/ Carbon/Silicon) used a Les Paul Junior, Les Paul Standard, several Les Paul Customs, and a Melody maker during his tenure with The Clash. He currently uses Les Paul Junior Double Cut.
- Steve Jones (Sex Pistols) uses Les Paul Customs, Firebirds, Flying Vs, and a Gibson Les Paul Double Cut in his early days. Gibson produces an "Inspired by" series of Jones' Les Paul model.

== K ==
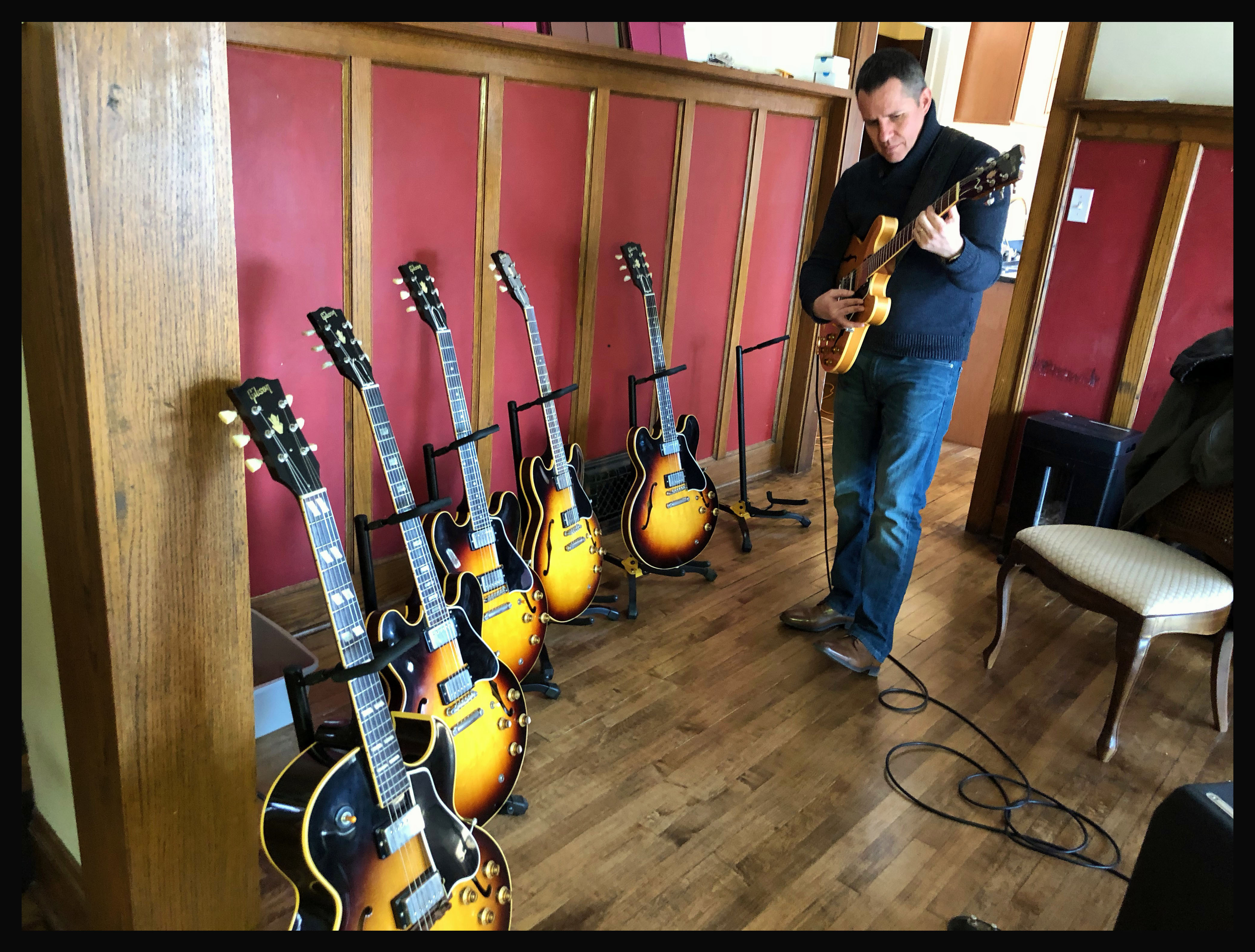
Guy King trying out vintage Gibson guitars.

- Jorma Kaukonen, a self-described "Gibson nut," played an ES-345 or 355 for most of his career with Jefferson Airplane, and a J-45, a J-190 and an Advanced Jumbo as a solo artist. He has also endorsed the Epiphone equivalents.
- Bill Kelliher (Mastodon) used several different models during the band's early recording/touring career including a trio of Les Paul Customs (ebony, silverburst, & alpine white) and a trio of Explorers (a vintage CMT in tobacco sunburst plus ebony & white models).
- Barney Kessel used an ES-350 and ES-350T. Gibson produced a "Barney Kessel" model in their Artist Model series in 1960.
- Albert King was a left-handed "upside-down/backwards" guitarist: he usually played a Flying V flipped over upside-down so the low E string was on the bottom.
- B. B. King used many different Gibson models, including an ES-5 and an ES-175 early in his career; later he began using thinline hollow-body (ES-330) and semi-hollow (aka "semi-acoustic") models (ES-335 and ES-345.) King's Signature ES-355, nicknamed Lucille, was his main guitar for many years.
- Freddie King used a Goldtop Les Paul with P-90 pickups. Also used an ES-355 in some live performances.
- Guy King Plays a 1982 Gibson ES-335TD Natural and a 1982 Gibson ES-335TD Sunburst.
- Mark Knopfler Played a 1979 Gibson Les Paul Standard Reissue '59 on the Dire Straits song 'Money for Nothing'. He also owns a 1985 Gibson Les Paul Standard Reissue '59, Sunburst. This custom shop model has got his birthdate (12849) as the serial number. He also plays other Gibson models like a 'super 400', an 'es 175' and a 'Chet Atkins'.
- Paul Kossoff (Free) "was a passionate Les Paul player able to say in a few notes what many dozens were attempting." Kossoff used several late-50s Les Paul models as well as an ES-335 for occasional studio use.
- Lenny Kravitz used a Flying V in his music video "Are You Gonna Go My Way". He also plays a sunburst Les Paul.
- Robby Krieger (The Doors) uses an SG, an ES-335 and a Melody Maker. He also used a black Gibson Les Paul for slide guitar in the studio while with The Doors.

== L ==
- Andrew Latimer (Camel) uses a variety of Les Paul models, for instance Gibson Les Paul.
- Albert Lee owns a black 1958 Les Paul Custom given to him by Eric Clapton, a black 1958 J-200 given to him by Don Everly and an Everly Brothers model. Lee played the J-200 during the Concert For George. The guitars are usually kept under lock and key.
- Alvin Lee (Ten Years After) used a customized ES-335 nicknamed "Big Red". The Gibson Custom shop now produces a reissue of Lee's guitar.
- John Lennon used a J-160E while with The Beatles. Several of the songs on the White Album he composed in India on Donovan's J-45. As a solo artist, Lennon used a Les Paul Special and a modified Les Paul Junior. Gibson makes a limited-edition replica of his J-160E and an "inspired by" John Lennon Les Paul replicating the modified Junior.
- Terry Lewis of The Time played a Gibson Flying V Bass, which was prominently featured in their 1982 video, "Cool".
- Alex Lifeson (Rush) has used many different Gibson models over the course of his career including: a '68 sunburst ES-335, a '78 black / '77 sunburst ES-345, a '77 white ES-355, a '78 white / '76 cherry EDS-1275, a cherry SG, a sunburst Howard Roberts Fusion, an ES-369, a variety of Les Paul models, a Dove, and a J-45 acoustic. Gibson now has issued an "Inspired By series" of Lifeson's original white 355 as well as the Alex Lifeson Axxess Les Paul guitar.
- Jeff Lynne (ELO) uses a variety of Gibson guitars in live performance and recordings.

== M ==
- Lonnie Mack has used a 1958 Flying V fitted with a Bigsby vibrato tailpiece since the first year the Flying V was manufactured. He refers to it a "No. 7", as he was told that it was the seventh guitar off the production line. In the mid-1990s Gibson issued a limited-edition "Lonnie Mack" model of the guitar.
- Ian MacKaye always played one of two different Gibson SG with Fugazi.
- Phil Manzanera uses a Gibson Firebird V11. He named his album Firebird V11 (2008) after that instrument.
- Frank Marino has used 1960s Gibson SG guitars throughout his entire career.
- Bob Marley (Bob Marley and The Wailers) used a Les Paul Special. The guitar is buried with him in his mausoleum. Gibson has released a Bob Marley Signature Les Paul Special.
- Bernie Marsden uses a 1959 Les Paul known as The Beast which he acquired in 1974 and has used extensively since, particularly through his time with Whitesnake.
- Pat Martino uses a Pat Martino Signature model. He formerly used an L5S.
- Tak Matsumoto (B'z/solo) uses his own Les Paul signature model issued in 1999, which made him the first Asian artist to be bestowed with the honor. A number of other Gibson models comprise his collection, including a number of custom-issued Gibson DC's designed solely for him.
- Paul McCartney owns a rare left-handed 1957 Les Paul Goldtop. Like many players, McCartney has replaced the fragile original tuning machines with a more modern sturdy set. He uses a left-handed 1960 Les Paul Standard (one of three known examples) as his main stage guitar. He also uses a C-5 in the studio. There is also photographic evidence of him using a Firebird VII fitted with a Bigsby vibrato, which appears to be a right-handed non-reverse model refitted as left-handed.
- Jimmy McCulloch used a Gibson SG and Les Paul with Wings.
- John McLaughlin has used many different Gibson models over the years, including Les Pauls, an EDS-1275, ES-335s, Byrdlands, a sunburst dual-pickup Johnny Smith model, an ES-345 and Hummingbird acoustics. He also used an SG on "Bitches Brew", Miles Davis' breakout fusion album from 1969.
- Ralph McTell uses a J-45, and records with a 'Robert Johnson Reissue' L-1
- Pat Metheny used a humbucker-equipped 1960 ES-175N for much of his career, until switching to a signature model Ibanez hollowbody in the 2000s. Metheny has also used a Les Paul on occasion, notably on Zero Tolerance for Silence
  Greek guitarist and composer Adonis Mitzelos playing a Gibson SG guitar during the 1980 recording sessions of P.L.J. Band's progressive rock album 'Armageddon' at Mastersound Studio in Athens.
- Adonis Mitzelos played a Gibson SG Studio on the 1982 PLJ Band progressive rock album Armageddon and his 2000 solo album Beyond the Light, while also using a Les Paul Standard during the 1980s. His primary electric guitar with the rock bandTermites was a "Ferrari Red" Gibson Explorer EXP 425/XPL, used to record the iconic solo for "Poso Se Thelo". His collection also includes a rare 1958 Flying V Corina, and he has recorded over 2,500 tracks in Greek discography using his 1994 Gibson Dove acoustic guitar.
- Bill Monroe, the "Father of Bluegrass," used a Lloyd Loar-signed Gibson scroll-top F5 mandolin, making it the reference standard for bluegrass mandolinists. Monroe's F5 is now in the Country Music Hall of Fame.
- Wes Montgomery used an ES-175 early in his career as well as an L5 CES. Gibson currently produces a Wes Montgomery Signature model L5 CES.
- Gary Moore (Thin Lizzy/Skid Row/solo) used a Les Paul Standard and had two separate Les Paul signature models released by Gibson. Moore formerly owned the famous 1959 Les Paul used by Peter Green during his Fleetwood Mac tenure. and had his own personal Les Paul model reconfigured to match the unusual modification of the Green original. He was also vocal about his fondness for the Explorer, which he used in his later solo career.
- Scotty Moore (Elvis Presley's original lead guitarist) initially played an ES-295, before switching to an L5 CES and subsequently a Super 400 CES. In 1999, Gibson reissued the ES-295 as the Scotty Moore Signature model.
- Dave Mustaine is a "Gibson Ambassador", and the company launched a line of acoustic and electric guitars in partnership with Mustaine.

== N ==
- Jimmy Nolen (The J.B.'s) used various Gibson models.
- Ted Nugent is most closely associated with early 1960s Byrdland models in black, sunburst and natural, and Gibson has developed a Byrdland model named for him. More recently, he has occasionally used a '59 sunburst Les Paul and an American-flag-motif Les Paul.

== O ==
- Mike Oldfield used an L6S around 1978, various Les Paul models and an SG Junior, which featured on many of his albums in the seventies and eighties.
- Roy Orbison used an ES-335 and a Les Paul with a Bigsby tailpiece.
- Dolores O'Riordan used an ES-335 throughout her entire career and later, also used a white SG Standard.
- Buzz Osborne (Melvins) primarily used Gibson Les Paul guitars from the 1960s and 1970s played through Boss effect pedals and variety of vintage amplifiers and cabinets.

== P ==
- Jimmy Page (The Yardbirds/Led Zeppelin/solo) uses a 1959 Les Paul ("Number 1", acquired from Joe Walsh), a 1959 Les Paul ("Number 2"), a 1973 Les Paul, an EDS-1275, a 1977 RD Artist, an ES5 Switchmaster, a Goldtop Premium Les Paul and a 1991 Custom Shop Les Paul (built to be an exact replica of "Number 1" and re-nicknamed "Number 3"). Page also owned a modified 1960 Les Paul Custom "Black Beauty" with a Bigsby tailpiece and a 3-pickup configuration. This guitar was stolen in 1970 but was recovered in early 2016. For acoustics Page used a Hummingbird, a J-200 and an A-2 mandolin. Gibson has released a Jimmy Page Signature model Les Paul replicating the features of "Number 2". Page used an EDS-1275 double neck guitar during his live performances of Stairway to Heaven, The Rain Song and The Song Remains the Same.
- Joe Pass used a sunburst ES-175; Epiphone currently produces a Joe Pass signature Emperor model.
- Pata (X Japan/Ra:IN) uses Les Pauls almost exclusively. His most well-known are a yellow 1959 Standard nicknamed "Ichi-Gō" (Japanese: 1号; lit. "Number 1") or his "Honsai" (本妻; lit. "legal wife"), a modified 1955 Goldtop with its paint rubbed down to the wood, earning it the name "Hage" (ハゲ; lit. "Bald"), or a black 1975 Custom nicknamed "Jōmu" (常務; lit. "Managing Director").
- Les Paul helped design the guitar named after him, and used a custom model.
- Joe Perry (Aerosmith) has used many Gibson models over the years, including ES-335s, Les Pauls, Flying Vs, and Firebirds; has signature Gibson and Epiphone Les Paul models nicknamed "Boneyard".
- Tony Perry (Pierce the Veil) has used Gibson SG guitars.
- Carl Perkins - "the King of Rockabilly" - used, at various points in his career, a Les Paul Goldtop, an L5 and an SG.
- Vicki Peterson of The Bangles plays a Les Paul Custom.
- Eddie Phillips (The Creation), used a Gibson ES-335, also with a violin bow in the mid-1960s. Andy Powell (Wishbone Ash) has used a Flying V throughout his entire career.
- Elvis Presley appeared frequently in concert and films playing a 1956 J-200N, which he had inlaid with his name in 1960.
- John Prine used a J-200.
- Preecha Chanapai (Carabao) uses a custom Gibson Explorer with the bottom section cut straight.

== R ==
- Mick Ralphs (Bad Company/Mott the Hoople) used a Les Paul Junior, a Firebird and a Les Paul during his Mott the Hoople tenure; and a Les Paul Standard and a Flying V during his years with Bad Company. Ralphs currently uses Les Paul Custom Shop '58 & '59 reissue models.
- Randy Rhoads (Quiet Riot/Ozzy Osbourne) used an off-white Les Paul Custom.
- Keith Richards (The Rolling Stones) has used a variety of Gibsons throughout his career; he's favoured Les Pauls and ES models, but has also occasionally been seen with assorted other models, including Firebirds, a Flying V, an SG, an L6S and a Melody Maker. In 1964 Richards got a 1959 sunburst Les Paul with a Bigsby tailpiece; the guitar was the first "star-owned" Les Paul in Britain and served as one of Richards' main instruments through 1966. He later sold the guitar to future Rolling Stones bandmate Mick Taylor. In the mid-60s Richards acquired a 1953 Les Paul Goldtop and the first of a series of 1957 Les Paul Customs. One of the latter, hand-painted with psychedelic patterns, would be one of his main stage and studio guitars from 1968 through the end of the Rolling Stones' 1970 European tour. Throughout the 1970s he continued to use various Gibson models on stage and in music videos. Among these were a second 1959 sunburst Les Paul, a 1954 Les Paul Custom "Black Beauty" and a cherry red 1958 Les Paul Junior, which he replaced in 1979 with a 1959 TV-yellow Les Paul Junior that he has used regularly on stage ever since. Since 1997 an ebony ES-355 has been among his favourite stage guitars, along with a white ES-345 that he unveiled in 2006. In rehearsal and studio photos and footage he's frequently seen with an ES-350 and ES-175D. Hummingbirds have been among his preferred acoustic models since 1965.
- Lee Ritenour - initially noted for playing a red ES-335, he also possesses a 1959 Les Paul which was a gift from Wes Montgomery. More recently he is using a 1959 Les Paul Reissue, and his own signature model Lee Ritenour L-5 archtop.
- Howard Roberts - used several Gibson models over the course of his career including: an ES-175, an L-10 and a heavily modified ES-150 simply known as "The Black Guitar". Gibson produces a Howard Roberts Fusion III signature model, which is a variation of an ES-165.
- Brian Robertson (Thin Lizzy/Motörhead) has used a Les Paul throughout his entire career, particularly during his time with Thin Lizzy.
- Rich Robinson (The Black Crowes) uses several different Gibson models, including a 1968 Les Paul Goldtop, a 1964 ES-335, a Customshop Flametop Les Paul, vintage SGs and double-cut Les Paul Specials, and a Dove.
- Mick Ronson (David Bowie) used a Les Paul Custom with the finish stripped for his guitar work on Ziggy Stardust and Aladdin Sane, among others.
- Gary Rossington (Lynyrd Skynyrd) used Les Pauls and SGs. Previously had a signature model Les Paul and SG released by Gibson.

== S ==
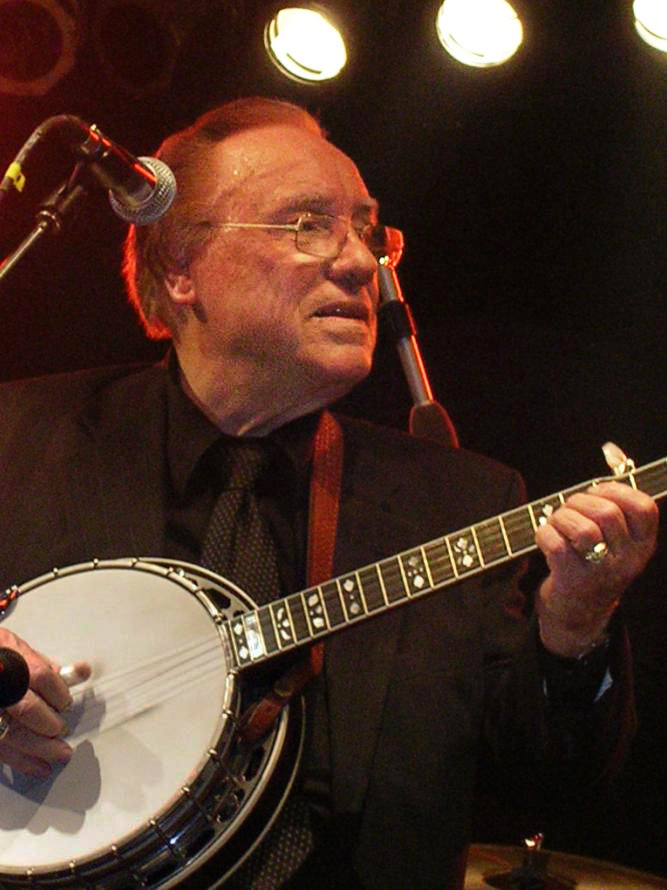
Earl Scruggs in 2005

- Carlos Santana used an SG Special onstage at Woodstock and appeared in advertisements for the L-6S in the 1970s. Santana has also used a sunburst 1968 Les Paul Custom.
- Michael Schenker (Scorpions/UFO/Michael Schenker Group) used four different 1970s Flying V models. Number 1 was a modified 1975 model; Numbers 2 and 3 were 1979 block-inlay Flying Vs; and Number 4 was a mid-70s white Flying V. Numbers 1, 2 and 3 had Schenker's trademark "half black/half white" paint scheme.
- Rudolf Schenker (Scorpions) uses various Flying V models dating from 1958 to 2001. He uses three 1958 original Flying Vs, three 1967-1969 Flying Vs, two 1971 Medallions (one was repainted black & white), a 1975 natural-finish Flying V, three 1983 replicas of the 1958 originals, four 1980 models and two 1984 Rudolf Schenker Signature models. Schenker has over 70 vintage and collectible Flying Vs along with several Custom Shop limited editions including a doubleneck Flying V.
- Tom Scholz (Boston) uses a 1968 Les Paul Goldtop with a DiMarzio SuperDistorion pickup in the bridge.
- Neal Schon (Journey) uses a heavily modified Les Paul, including a Floyd Rose locking tremolo, custom electronics and sustainer unit. Gibson produces a signature model of Schon's guitar.
- John Scofield initially used a 1962 Gibson ES-335 before playing a 1982 Ibanez Artist AS-200. His ES-335 is featured on the cover of his 1979 release Who's Who.
- Earl Scruggs (one of the original Bill Monroe Blue Grass Boys) is noted for inventing a unique banjo style (now referred to as Scruggs style) that has become one of the defining characteristics of bluegrass music. Scruggs' use of a flathead Gibson Mastertone Granada has made that model the standard for bluegrass players. An inductee into both the Country Music Hall of Fame and the Bluegrass Hall of Honor, Gibson produces a signature model banjo, simply titled "The Earl", to honor Scruggs' monumental career achievements.

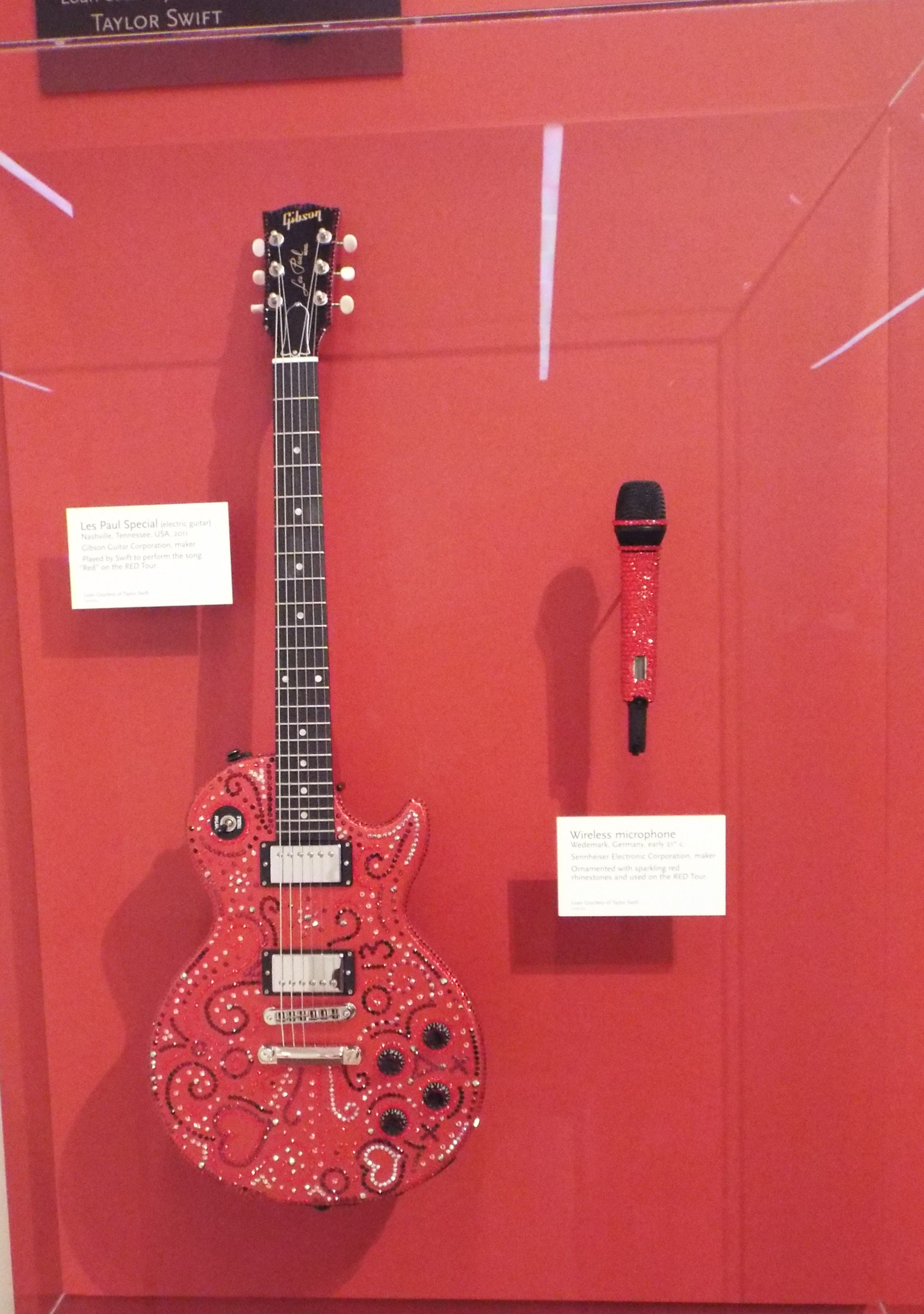
Taylor Swift's "Gibson Les Paul Special SL" guitar and cordless microphone.

- Nikki Sixx (Mötley Crüe/Sixx A.M.) has used a number of Thunderbird basses throughout his career. Between 2000 and 2003 Gibson manufactured a Sixx signature bass, the 'Blackbird'.
- Slash (Guns N' Roses/Slash's Snakepit/Velvet Revolver/Slash's Blues Ball) uses many different Les Paul models including his own custom shop Les Paul model. He has also used an EDS-1275. In addition to his custom shop Les Paul, Gibson has manufactured two other Slash Les Pauls.
- Johnny Smith was a Gibson endorsee from 1961 to 1989, during which time Gibson sold the Johnny Smith model. Smith switched to Heritage in 1989. Gibson continues to produce the design as the LeGrande.
- Chris Spedding, a top British session guitarist of the 1970s is well known for playing a Flying V.
- Bill Spooner (The Tubes) used a Flying V, an Explorer, a Les Paul, an SG and a 1959 Melody Maker.
- Paul Stanley (Kiss) used a Flying V, an Explorer, a Firebird I, an SG, and an L6S.
- Hubert Sumlin used a 1956 Les Paul Goldtop for many years and has used various Les Pauls and ES-335s.
- Bernard Sumner (Joy Division/New Order) used a Gibson SG Standard (customized, "without Vibrola") during his career with Joy Division and for the first phase of New Order. He then switched to an ES-335 for the latter part of New Order and still uses this today.

== T ==
- Mick Taylor (The Rolling Stones/solo) has used Les Pauls throughout his career, along with SGs, ES models and Firebirds. Taylor bought his first Les Paul from Selmer Musical Instruments in London. It was stolen in September 1967. In 1967 for a replacement, he bought Keith Richards' Bigsby-equipped 1959 sunburst Les Paul, which he used on stage until 1971, first with John Mayall & the Bluesbreakers and then (from July 1969) with The Rolling Stones. Taylor used other sunburst Les Pauls on the Rolling Stones' 1972-73 tours, and still frequently uses Les Pauls on stage.
- Sister Rosetta Tharpe was an early adopter of the Les Paul Gold-Top in 1956, and used a 1961 double-cutaway Les Paul Custom. She also used a white SG.
- George Thorogood uses an ES-125.
- Johnny Thunders used Les Paul Juniors.
- Pete Townshend (The Who/solo) used an SG Special from 1967 to 1972 and various customized Les Paul models from 1973 to 1979; he has also used an EDS-1275. Gibson produced a Townshend Signature model SG based on the guitar he played at Woodstock in August, 1969. The Townsend model was a limited edition and was discontinued by Gibson in 2003. In 2006 the Gibson Custom Shop started production of three different Les Paul signature models based on the guitars he played in the late 1970s. For acoustic work Townshend has consistently used SJ-200s. The cover of his 1982 solo album, All the Best Cowboys Have Chinese Eyes, shows Townshend holding a 1958 Flying V, Korina body with natural finish (gifted by Joe Walsh) which he also plays in the video for the album's song, "Slit Skirts".
- Derek Trucks of the Allman Brothers Band and the Derek Trucks Band uses a modified Gibson USA SG '61 reissue with factory Vibrola, which has had the tailpiece modified and a stopbar tailpiece installed.
- Ray Toro of My Chemical Romance has used Gibson Les Paul guitars throughout his career. He has also been seen to play Explorer and SG shapes. He is also known for frequently playing Epiphone guitars.

== V ==
- Eddie Van Halen used a Les Paul, an ES-335 and a 1958 Flying V.

== W ==
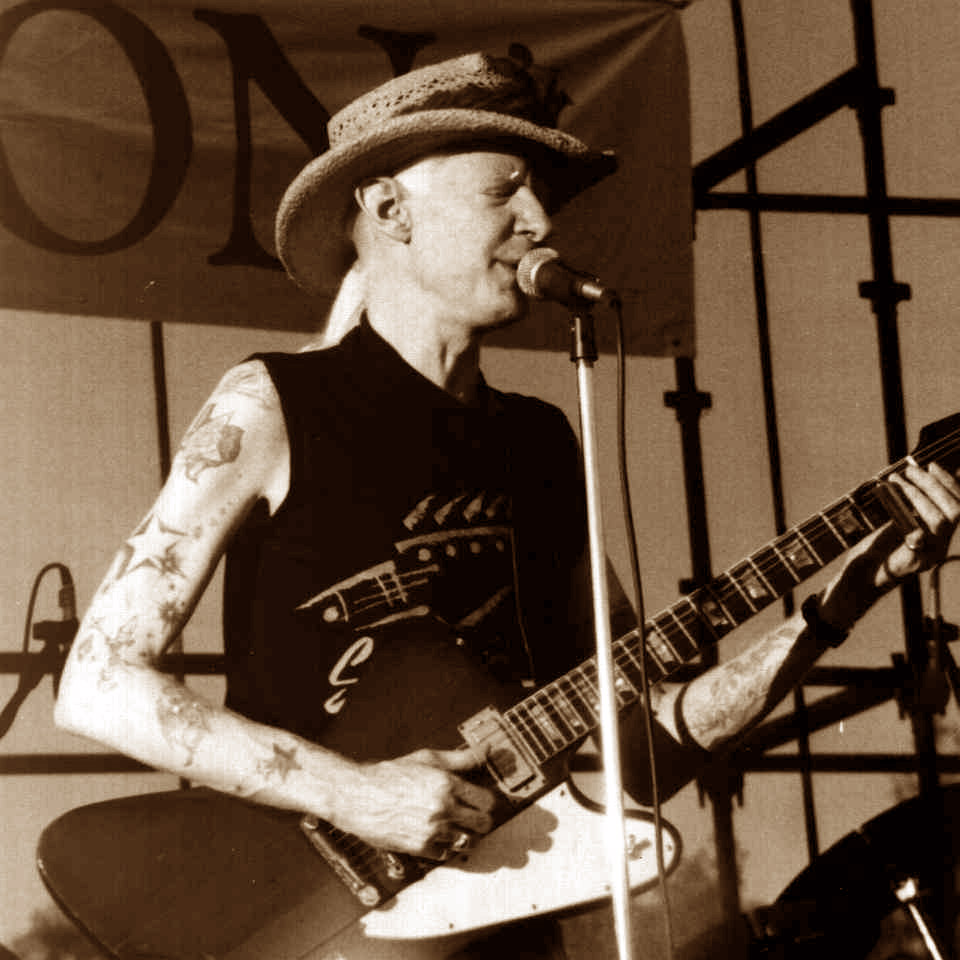
Johnny Winter on stage in 1990 with a Firebird

- T-Bone Walker electric blues guitar pioneer, used a Gibson ES-250, ES-5, and ES-335.
- Joe Walsh (James Gang/Eagles) uses a Les Paul Standard and an EDS-1275. Walsh was known for "hot-wiring" the pickups on these guitars to create his trademark "attack" sound.
- Muddy Waters used a Les Paul Goldtop in his early career.
- Bob Weir played an ES-335 for some years with the Grateful Dead.
- Paul Weller mentions that his favorite guitar is his 1968 Gibson SG Standard in Cherry Red. He uses a J-45 as his primary acoustic guitar, but has also used a B-45-12 12-string as well. More recently he has acquired a J-180 Everly Brothers signature model.
- Leslie West (Mountain) favoured a Les Paul Junior; demand for this model greatly increased after guitarists saw one in his hands, and Gibson began to reissue the model in the mid-1970s. West also used an SG and a Flying V.
- Snowy White uses a 1957 Les Paul Goldtop acquired in a trade for a Fender Stratocaster while in Sweden in 1968. White has been nicknamed "Gold Top" due to his longtime use of the model.
- Charlie Whitney of Family was known for playing a double-neck Gibson EDS-1275.
- Carl Wilson (The Beach Boys) used an ES-335. Custom made in 1962, it has blonde finish and gold hardware with a Bigsby B-7 tremolo. In 1983 the original guitar neck was broken and replaced with a neck from an ES-355.
- Johnny Winter - Played a Firebird, Les Pauls, SGs and Flying Vs.
- Ronnie Wood (Faces/The Rolling Stones) regularly uses Firebirds, Les Pauls and a J-200 acoustic on stage; he also owns a custom-built single-pickup L5S, a Super 400 CES and an L5. In the late 1970s Wood endorsed the S-1 guitar. In 1997 Gibson announced three Ron Wood signature models: a J-200, a Firebird and a Dobro.
- Zakk Wylde (Ozzy Osbourne/Pride & Glory/Black Label Society) uses a signature Les Paul "Bulls Eye" model, a signature Les Paul "Buzzsaw" model and signature "Camo" model with a camouflage finish. He is seen using a black EDS-1275 in the promotional video for In This River. Lately he has been using a custom SG/Flying V hybrid "Bulls Eye" model called the "ZV" for live Ozzy Osbourne shows. Wylde also has a new Custom Shop Flying V "Bulls Eye" that is currently in production complete with a Floyd Rose tremolo. His most recent signature, the "Zakk Wylde BFG" Les Paul is essentially a stripped-down version of his custom bullseye Les Pauls, available in bullseye and buzzsaw finishes. He also has a coffin shaped signature guitar produced by Epiphone called the "Graveyard Disciple." It is equipped with a Floyd Rose tremolo.

== Y ==
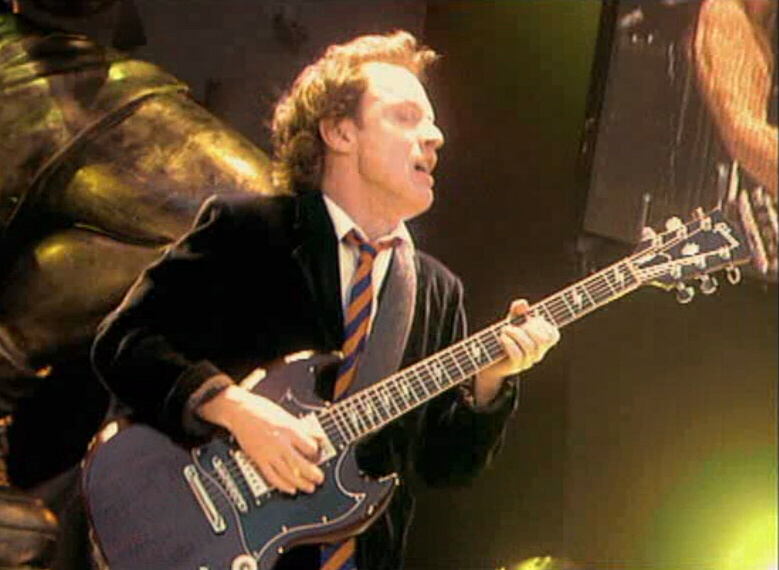
Angus Young playing his custom, heritage cherry SG, 2001

- Angus Young (AC/DC) uses an SG. Gibson has produced an Angus Young Signature SG model with lightning bolt inlays and an Angus Young signature humbucker in the bridge position.
- Neil Young uses several Gibson acoustic and electric models. Young's main guitar, "Old Black", is a 1953 Goldtop Les Paul (painted black) with a mini-humbucker from a Firebird in the bridge position and a Bigsby tailpiece. Young also has two other 1953 Goldtops, one which has modifications similar to "Old Black", the other a stock original. Also uses a J-200 and a Mastertone GB-3 banjo; on the Time Fades Away tour he used a 1958 Flying V.

== Z ==
- Frank Zappa used a 1953/54 Les Paul Goldtop, an SG, a late 70s Les Paul Custom and an ES-5 Switchmaster. An ES-355 was his main guitar on his 1970 tour. Zappa usually heavily modified his guitars to include preamps, balanced outputs for studio work, and later, Fernandes sustainers.

== See also ==
- Gibson Guitar Corporation
- Gibson Guitar Corporation product list
