= Gibson ES-225 =

Electric guitar model

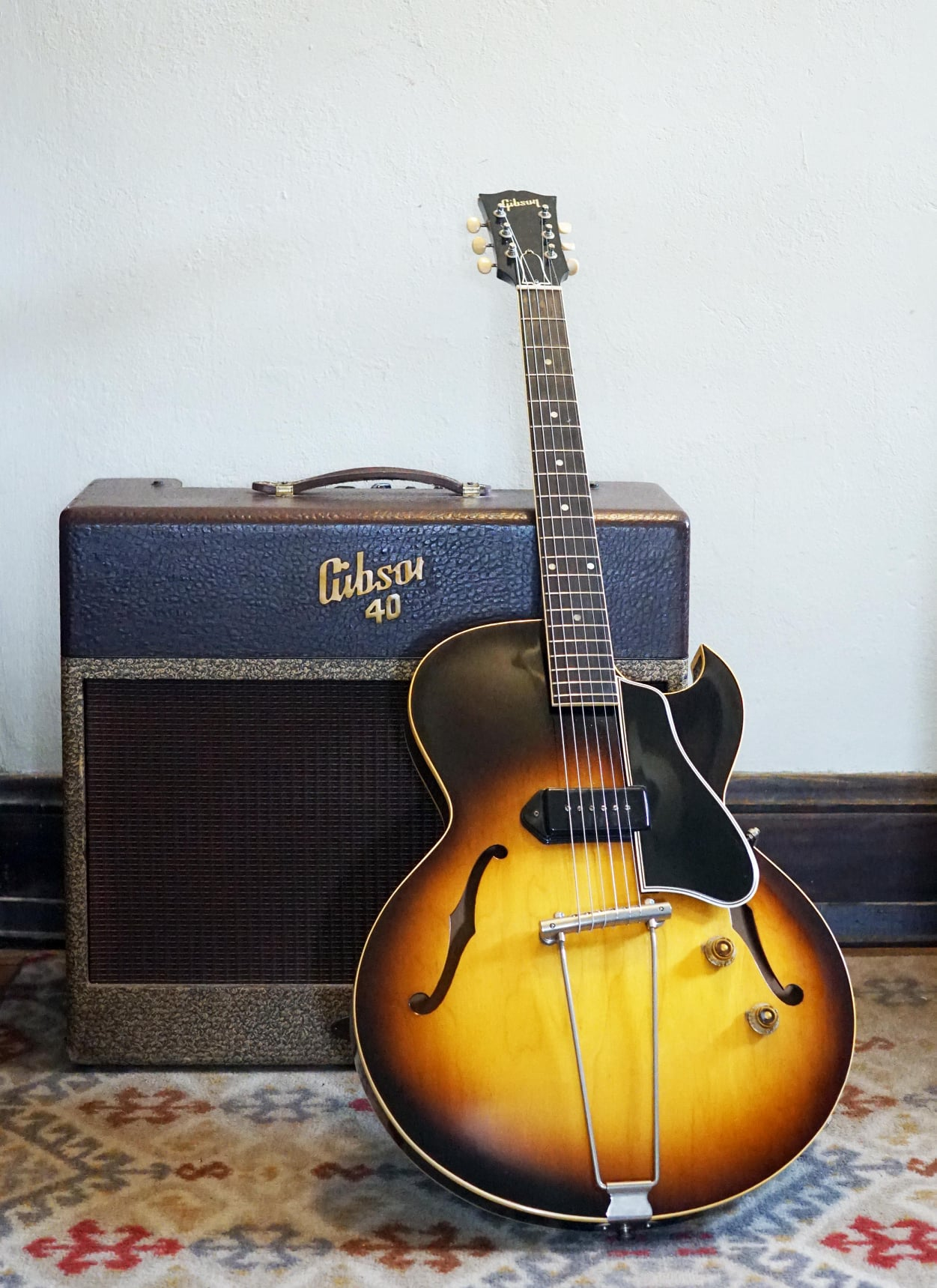
- 1955 Sunburst Gibson ES-225T
- Period: 1955–1959

Construction
- Body type: hollow
- Neck joint: Set
- Scale: 24.75"

Woods
- Body: maple (laminated) some have mahogany sides -- sunburst models not natural
- Neck: mahogany
- Fretboard: rosewood

Hardware
- Bridge: Les Paul combination bridge/tailpiece
- Pickup: 1 or 2 P-90s

Colors available
- tobacco sunburst, natural

The Gibson ES-225 is a thinline hollowbody electric guitar model produced by the Gibson Guitar Corporation between 1955 and 1959. It is notable as the first thinline hollowbody guitar produced by Gibson.

== History ==
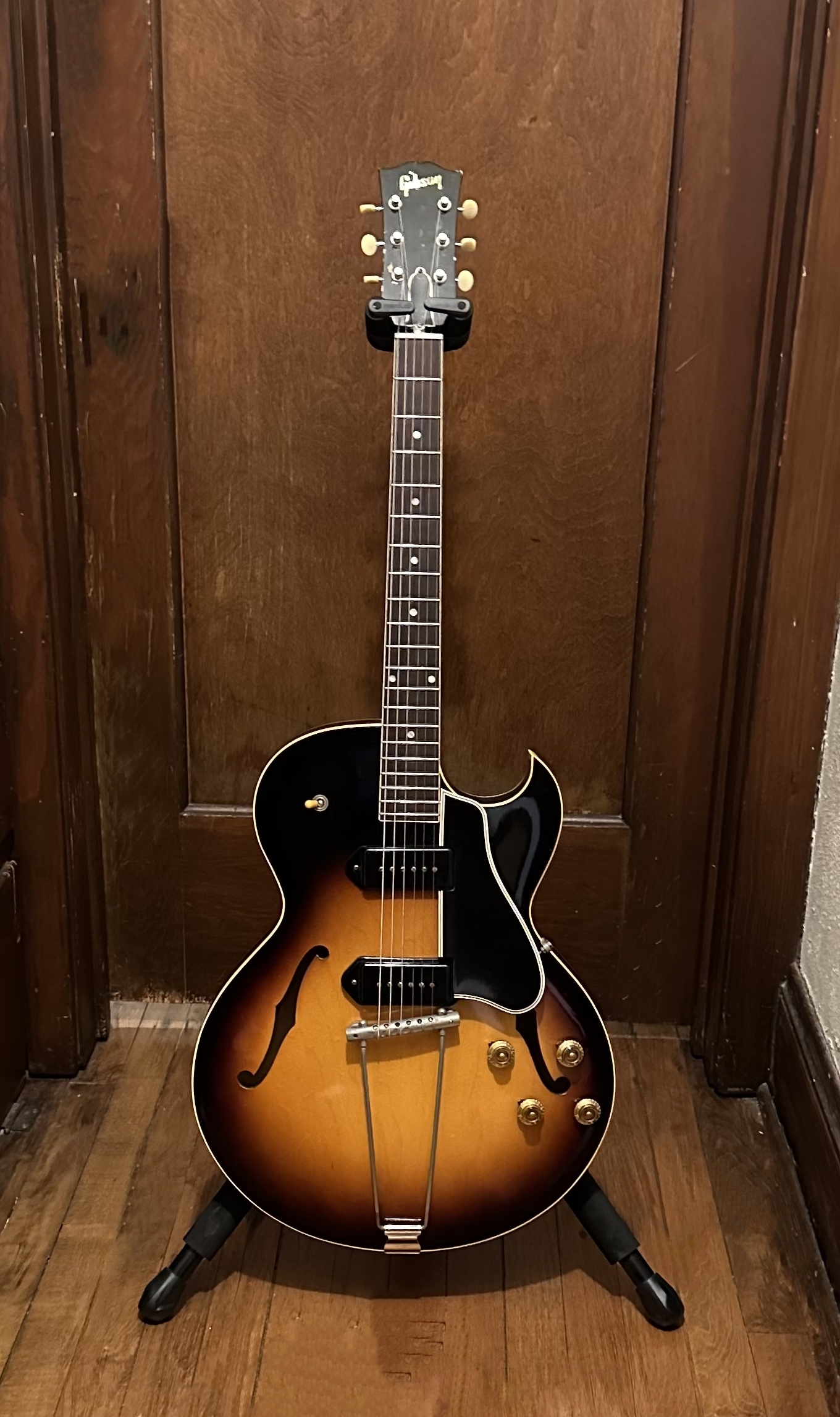
1957 Gibson ES-225TD - two pickup version

The ES-225 was originally introduced in 1955 as the ES-225T. A thinline hollowbody guitar featuring a Florentine cutaway, the Les Paul combined bridge and tailpiece (also used on the Les Paul from 1952 to 1953 and on the ES-295), a laminated pickguard, and a single P-90 pickup mounted in an unusual position midway between the bridge and the end of the fingerboard. From 1956, the ES-225TD, a twin pickup model with conventional pickup positioning, was also available. Both models had a tobacco sunburst finish, with more expensive natural finish models (ES225TN and ES-225TDN) also available from 1956.

== Specifications ==
The specifications remained the same during the period the guitars were manufactured. The exception was 1959, when a few guitars were made with separate trapeze-style tailpieces and floating Tune-o-matic bridges.

When the guitar was initially marketed, it was the first thinline hollowbody guitar Gibson had produced, preceding the Byrdland and ES-350T models. In 1959, the ES-225 was phased out in favour of the ES-330 and ES-125T models.

== Reception ==
Gibson shipped 5,220 of the single pickup ES-225 and 2,754 of the twin pickup models.
