= Gibson Les Paul Custom =

Higher-end variation of the Gibson Les Paul guitar

Les Paul Custom
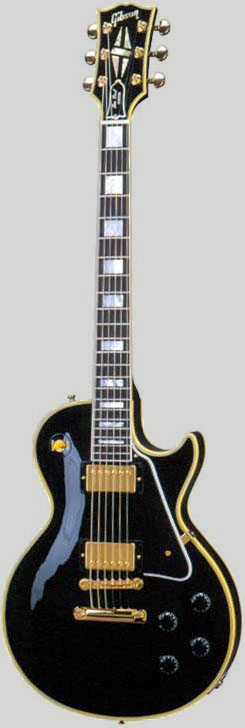
- A Les Paul 57 Custom
- Manufacturer: Gibson
- Period: 1954–1960; 1968–present

Construction
- Body type: Solid
- Neck joint: Set
- Scale: 24.75 in (629 mm)

Woods
- Body: Mahogany or Mahogany/Maple
- Neck: Mahogany or Maple
- Fretboard: Ebony, Maple, Richlite

Hardware
- Bridge: Fixed, Tune-o-matic, Tremolo
- Pickup(s): 2 or 3 Humbuckers, originally 2 P-90s

Colors available
- Ebony, Alpine White, Tobacco Sunburst, Wine Red, Cherry Sunburst, Silver Burst, Gold/Bronze Sunburst, Natural "the Natural" (maple top w/maple fingerboard) Natural with Ebony Fingerboard (maple top w/ebony fingerboard Sam Ash Special 1975)

The Gibson Les Paul Custom is a higher-end variation of the Gibson Les Paul guitar. It was developed in 1953 after Gibson had introduced the Les Paul model in 1952.

== History ==
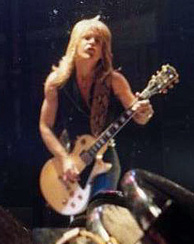
Ozzy Osbourne guitarist Randy Rhoads with his 1974 Gibson Les Paul Custom

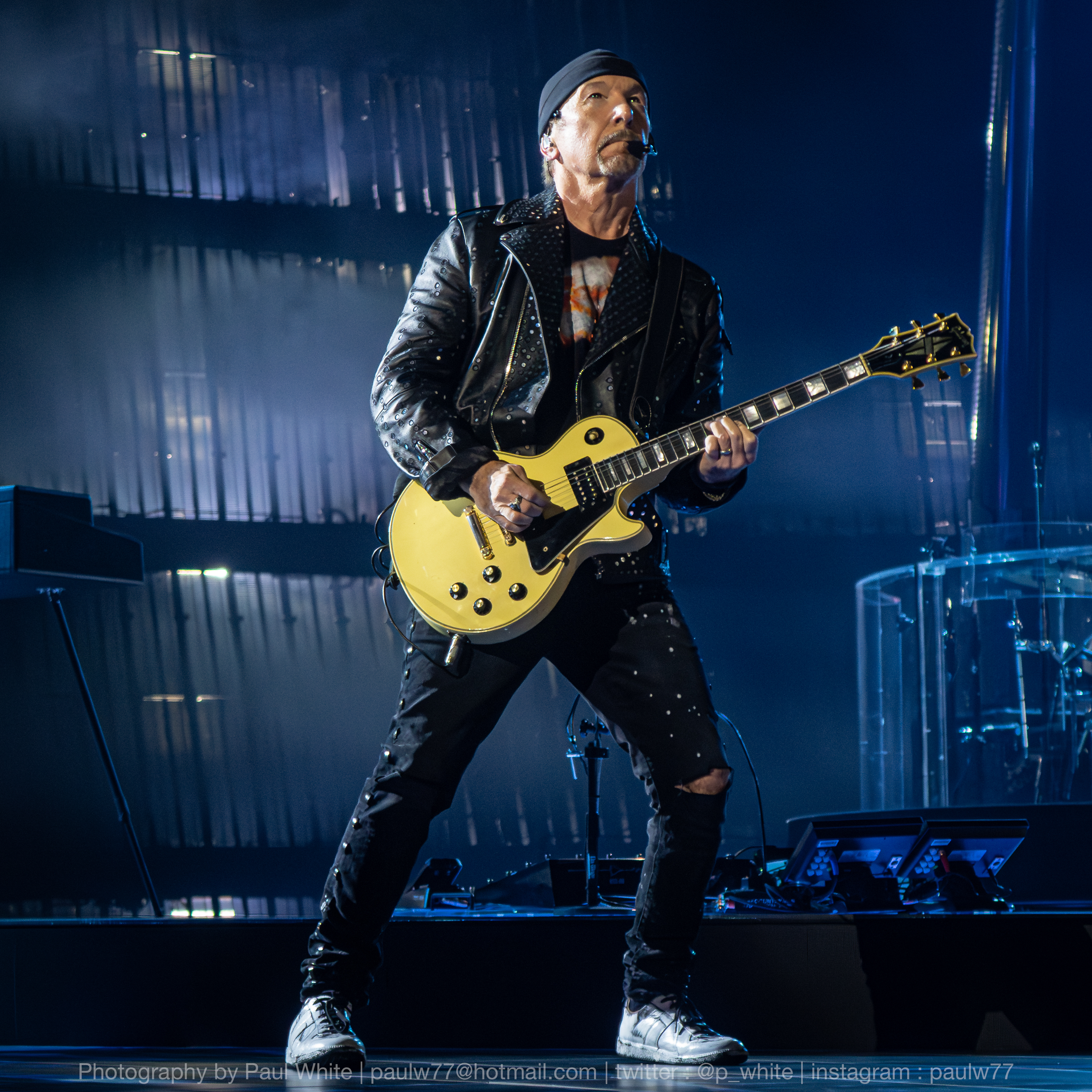
U2 guitarist the Edge with his vintage Gibson Les Paul Custom

The 1952 Gibson Les Paul was originally made with a mahogany body, a mahogany neck with a rosewood fretboard, two P-90 single coil pickups, and a one-piece, 'trapeze'-style bridge/tailpiece with strings fitted under (instead of over) a steel stop-bar, (Note: In the summer of 1952, a Gibson Les Paul Goldtop was priced at US$209 (equivalent to $2,534 in 2025) The 2014 Les Paul Custom Pro Alpine White variant was valued at £1800 in 2024) and available only with a gold-finished top, giving rise to the moniker "Gold-Top". In late 1953, a more luxurious version was introduced, most probably on specific request by Les Paul himself, as he wanted a more luxurious and classy looking guitar. He requested a black guitar as he wanted it to "look like a tuxedo". Nicknamed the Black Beauty, the guitar had a mahogany body and neck, ebony fret board, and mother of pearl block inlays on the fret board. The "Split Diamond" inlay on the headstock was taken from the carved archtop Super 400, which was the top of the Gibson line. The pickups were a P-90 in the bridge position and an Alnico V pickup (nicknamed the staple pickup), newly designed by Seth Lover, in the neck position. The frets are low and flat, as opposed to the usual medium jumbo frets found on other Les Paul customs, and the guitar soon was given the nickname "The Fretless Wonder". The 1954 Les Paul Custom also saw the introduction of Gibson's new bridge, the ABR-1.

In mid-1957, Gibson began to equip the Les Paul Custom with the new PAF (Patent Applied For) pickup designed by Seth Lover. By 1958, Gibson had replaced the Kluson tuners with Grover Rotomatics. It is this configuration that remained until the guitar was discontinued in 1960, replaced by the new double cutaway body Les Paul model, which later became the Gibson SG. There are a small number of 1961 Les Paul Customs that were made with the single cutaway body before the transition to the new, SG-style body was complete.

The Les Paul Custom remained a double cutaway model until 1963, when Les Paul's endorsement with Gibson ended, and the guitar was subsequently renamed the SG Custom.

In 1968, Gibson re-introduced the Les Paul Custom. The headstock angle was changed from 17 to 14 degrees, a wider headstock and a maple top (in lieu of the original 1953–1961 solid-mahogany construction). In 1969, Norlin acquired Gibson, and the Les Paul Custom saw many changes in the "Norlin Era". The solid-mahogany body was replaced in late 1969 with a "pancake" body (a two piece mahogany body with a thin slice of maple in between), which was discontinued in 1976, however they could still be found as late as 1979. The mahogany neck was replaced with a three-piece maple neck in 1975 (discontinued around 1982), a "Made in USA" stamp was added to the back of the headstock, and a volute was added to the back of the neck to strengthen the thinnest part of the neck, just below the headstock (also discontinued in 1982).

In 1974, Gibson released the 20th anniversary Les Paul Custom in white, black, cherry sunburst and honey sunburst finishes (at least those four colors were made) with "20th Anniversary" engraved on the 15th-fret block inlay. By 1976, the new Nashville bridge began to replace the ABR-1. In 1977, the "pancake" maple layer was subtracted from the body, though the top was still maple, as was the neck. It was around this time that the current serial number system appears as well. In 1975, Gibson began making a number of Customs with maple fingerboards, instead of the typical ebony, which was discontinued by the early 1980s. From 1979 to 1982 or 1983, Gibson made a limited edition of 75 Les Paul Customs worldwide in the Silverburst color with 2 "Tim Shaw Burstbuckers". After 1981, the volute was phased out.

In 1984, Gibson closed the Kalamazoo plant, and all production was moved to Nashville. In 1986, Norlin sold Gibson to a group of investors led by Henry Juszkiewicz. By the end of the 1980s, the Les Paul Custom specifications feature a mahogany neck with ebony fingerboard, Standard Gibson frets (as opposed to wide, flatter frets), and a smaller headstock, a mahogany body with a maple top, gold hardware, two humbucking pickups, and a Nashville bridge.

Gibson has been installing its 490R/498T pickups as standard equipment on the majority of Customs since the 1990s.

=== Custom ordered Customs ===
Les Paul Custom guitars from 2000 to 2003 were specially made to the requirements of the client, as regards fretboard, neck and body woods, and type of hardware, with some models allowing for requests for specific numbers of turns in the pickups' coils, as well. Individual logo designs and hard cases were also manufactured at the request of the customer. Specific Custom Shop serial numbers were assigned, encoded with Les Paul Custom's smaller, more compact serial number in the format "CS XXXXX".

== See also ==
- List of Gibson players
