= Gibson ES-350T =

Thinline hollowbody electric guitar

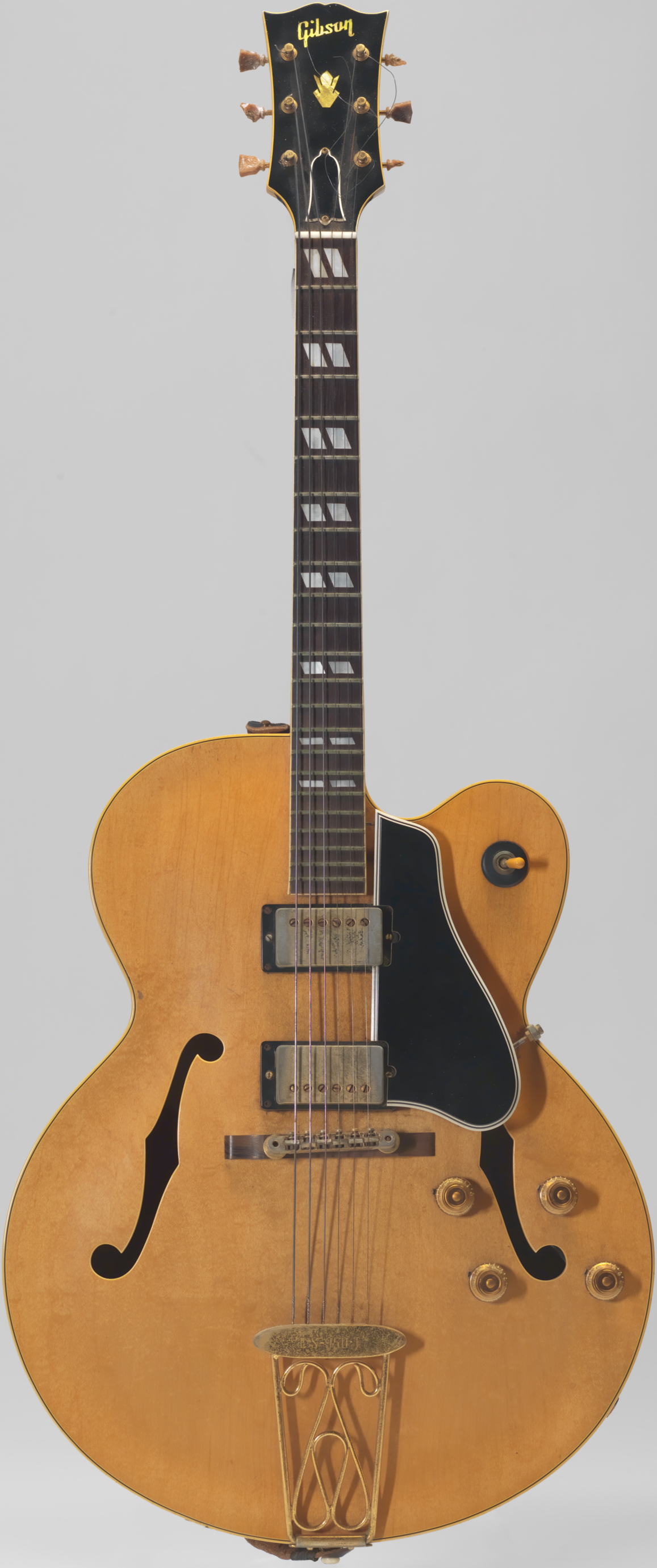
- Chuck Berry's Gibson ES-350T guitar, named Maybellene
- Manufacturer: Gibson
- Period: 1955–1963, 1977–1981, various special editions

Construction
- Body type: Hollow
- Neck joint: Set neck
- Scale: 23.5 in (597 mm)

Woods
- Body: Maple
- Neck: Maple
- Fretboard: Rosewood

Hardware
- Bridge: Tune-o-matic
- Pickup(s): 2 P-90s (1955–1957); 2 humbuckers (1957–present)

Colors available
- Various, often sunburst-type finishes

The Gibson ES-350T is an electric guitar model from Gibson Guitar Corporation, released in 1955. The ES-350T is a further development of the Gibson ES-350 model from 1947 and as such has a completely hollow body. The unique feature of the Gibson ES-350T at the time of its market introduction was the reduced width of the rims. As a result, the guitar has a thinner body compared to instruments with a resonance body that is of full thickness. The ES-350T, together with its sister models Gibson ES-225 TDN and Gibson Byrdland, was one of the first models of the thinline guitar type.

== Design ==
The letter T in the model name of the ES 350T stands for thinline and was given by Gibson at the same time as the three new models of hollow-bodies with narrow sides and flat bodies were introduced. The body of the ES-350T – the arched top and bottom as well as the frames – is made entirely of laminated maple. The neck of the guitar, glued into the body, is made of maple and has a rosewood fingerboard. The neck is glued to the body at the 14th fret. The fretboard has 22 frets and has inlays in the form of double parallelograms between the frets. Also made of rosewood is the base plate of the two-piece bridge with individually adjustable string rulers made of metal. The lower ends of the strings are held by a trapezoidal metal string holder, which is attached to the lower frame.

In addition to the thinline body, another feature of the Gibson ES-350T is its shortened length of only 597 mm (23 1/2 inch compared to Gibson's standard 24 3/4 inch). It has been stated that this short scale is due to the jazz guitarist Tal Farlow, who had expressed the desire to make difficult chords and melodies easier to grasp. Against this assumption, when Gibson honoured Tal Farlow with his own signature model in 1962, the Gibson Valley Farlow, – it had a standard scale of 648 mm. It is more likely that the short scale came about as Gibson developed the ES-350T from the Byrdland using less-costly hardware and detailing, and offered it as a less expensive model. Both the early ES-350T models and Byrdland models have particularly narrow spacing between the individual strings, which required the manufacture of special, narrow-built pickups for these models. The scale length was extended from 1977 to 1981 to 25.5 inches.

The first edition of the ES-350T from the year 1955 was equipped with two Gibson P-90s, which are single coil pickups. By 1957, these were replaced by the newly developed Gibson PAF double coil humbucker pickups, which were developed in the same year. The pickups are adjusted by means of four potentiometers mounted on the top (one volume control and one tone control) and a three-stage toggle switch close to the cutaway at the neck. This cutaway begun with a rounded "Venetian" shape in 1955. In 1960 Gibson changed to the "Florentine" cutaway form with a sharp edge in the frame. Later re-editions of the ES-350T again have the outwardly rounded frame at the cutaway.

Gibson's custom shop reissued the ES350T in 1992 as a limited edition in both a traditional vintage sunburst and natural (blonde) finish. These models had gold hardware, Gibson PAF humbuckers, Curly Maple Body, the longer 25.5" scale (like the 1977–81 run), and a 1 11/16" nut width. Other examples in blonde can be found online dating from 1996, but it remains unclear whether these examples are customer orders or from a specific Gibson issue. From 1996 onward the ES350T has been available as a custom order only, with buyers including Jimmy Page (Led Zeppelin) who acquired a twin p90 model in 2006, which was used in the O2 Arena show on December 10, 2007. Other users include Keith Richards and James Blood Ulmer, who uses an ES350T with a fitted Bigsby alongside his trademark Gibson Byrdland.

== The ES-350T and Chuck Berry ==
One of the first prominent users of the Gibson ES-350T was American rock and roll guitar legend Chuck Berry. Berry used the model exclusively from his first recordings at Chess Records. He first played an ES-350T with two P-90 pickups. This instrument can be seen on most of his early promotional photos, and he recorded most of his legendary recordings of the mid-1950s on it. In 1957, Chuck Berry bought a similar ES-350T, but it was equipped with two PAF humbucker pickups. Berry used the latter on most of his hits from the end of the 1950s. Chuck Berry probably would have continued to play the model. However, Gibson's production of the ES-350T was discontinued in 1963. As such, Berry switched to the Gibson ES-355, which became his new trademark.
