= Gibson ES-165 =

Archtop guitar model

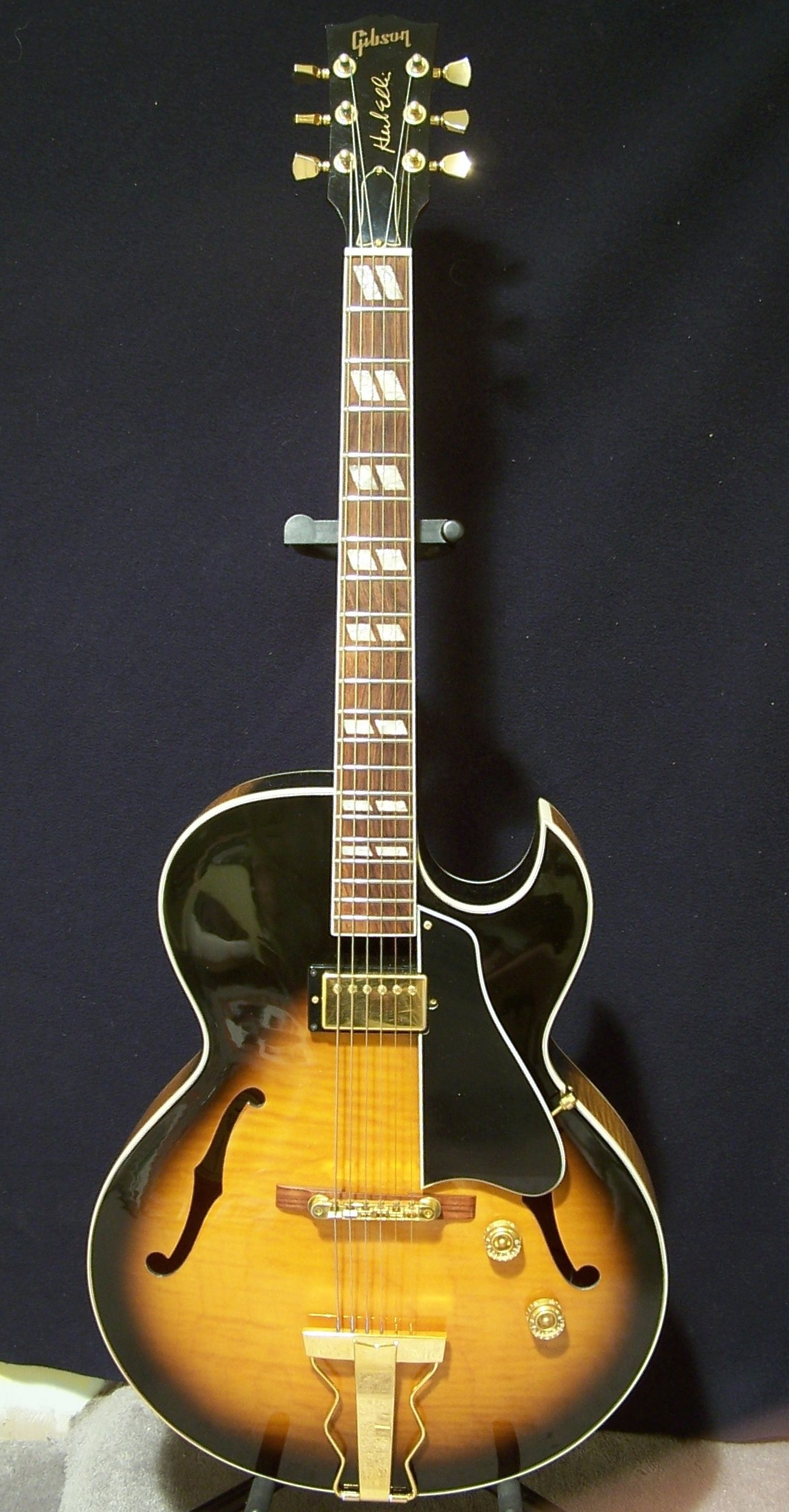
- Manufacturer: Gibson
- Period: 1991 to 2013

Construction
- Body type: Hollow
- Neck joint: Set

Woods
- Body: Figured Maple Laminated top, back, and sides
- Neck: One Piece Mahogany
- Fretboard: Rosewood

Hardware
- Bridge: Tune-O-Matic bridge with rosewood base
- Pickup(s): 1 Gibson 490R (1991–2004); 1 Gibson BJB Floating Pickup (2004–2013); ES-165 Herb Ellis Plus a two-pickup variant (2002–2004)

Colors available
- Vintage Sunburst, Cherry (disc 2001), Ebony, Wine Red, Light Burst (2004–2013)

The Gibson ES-165 Herb Ellis is an Archtop guitar manufactured by the Gibson Guitar Corporation in Nashville Tennessee. By March 2013, it was no longer in production.

The single-pickup ES-175s were first introduced in 1949 but were discontinued around 1971 although small custom runs including the ES-175CC (with a Charlie Christian reproduction pickup) were made. Herb's original 1953 ES-175 originally came with a single P-90 pickup in the neck position. This was replaced with Gibson humbucker in order to address some feedback issues.

The ES-165 debuted in 1991 (first model shipped was February 27, 1991), as Gibson's tribute to longtime ES-175 user Herb Ellis. It featured a Gibson 490R humbucker and a single tone and volume control mounted directly to the top. In 2004 the humbucker was replaced with a Gibson BJB Floating humbucker and the tone control was removed. The volume was moved to the surface of the pickguard.

== Features ==
This guitar features a 24¾" scale neck with 20 frets, joined at the 14th fret. The width at the nut is 1 11/16 inches. The bound fingerboard is rosewood with parallelogram markers. The early variant of this guitar features what Gibson refers to as a "rounded Jazz profile". This would be somewhat thicker than the standard neck dimensions. This neck profile would be changed to the standard profile in 2004.

The body is fully hollow with two internal lateral braces. Like the ES-175, it measures 16" across the lower bout and 3½ inches deep at the outer rims. Unlike Herb's original 1953 ES-175, the top and back laminate material consist of a figured maple top followed by poplar and another maple laminate. The original model would have been made of plain maple/basswood/maple. Hardware includes a zigzag trapeze tailpiece and Tune-O-Matic bridge mounted on a rosewood base. While the Tune-O-Matic bridge is branded as a Gibson part, the zigzag tailpiece is not and is most likely not an American-made part. There have also been several reports of this tailpiece failing at the hinge. All models of ES-165 feature gold plated hardware including "Tulip" Grover tuners (branded either as Gibson or Grover).

The ES-165 was originally released with a single 490R humbucker, one volume control (300k Linear taper) and one tone control (500K audio with a .022 microfarad ceramic disc capacitor.) In 2004 the 490R humbucker was replaced with a Gibson BJB Floating humbucker and the tone control was removed. The volume was moved to the surface of the pickguard. On all variants the pickguard is a three-ply black/white/black beveled pickguard.

Finally, instead of having the Gibson logo and crown inlaid on the headstock, a gold Gibson logo was stenciled with Herb Ellis' signature stenciled below it. The reason for putting the signature on the headstock instead of the trussrod cover was that Herb Ellis often removed the cover to install a Van Eps String Damper .In the 2004 variant the inlaid logo and crown return with Herb Ellis' name embossed on the trussrod cover. The earliest ES-165s shipped did not have Herb Ellis' signature on the headstock. This was added only after November, 1991.

In 1999 Gibson's Epiphone product line presented the Zephyr Regent guitar. Similar in size and construction to the ES-165, it differs in having a laminated mahogany back and sides and dot inlays on the fingerboard.

== Bibliography ==
- Fjestad, Zachary R. Blue Book of Electric Guitars.
- Ingram, Adrian (2007). The Gibson ES-175 Its History and its Players. Centerstream. ISBN 978-1574242232.
- Gibson USA ES-165 Herb Ellis Data Sheet.
- Gibson USA ES-165 Herb Ellis Schematic.
