= Gibson ES-175 =

Hollow body guitar by Gibson, 1949 to 2019

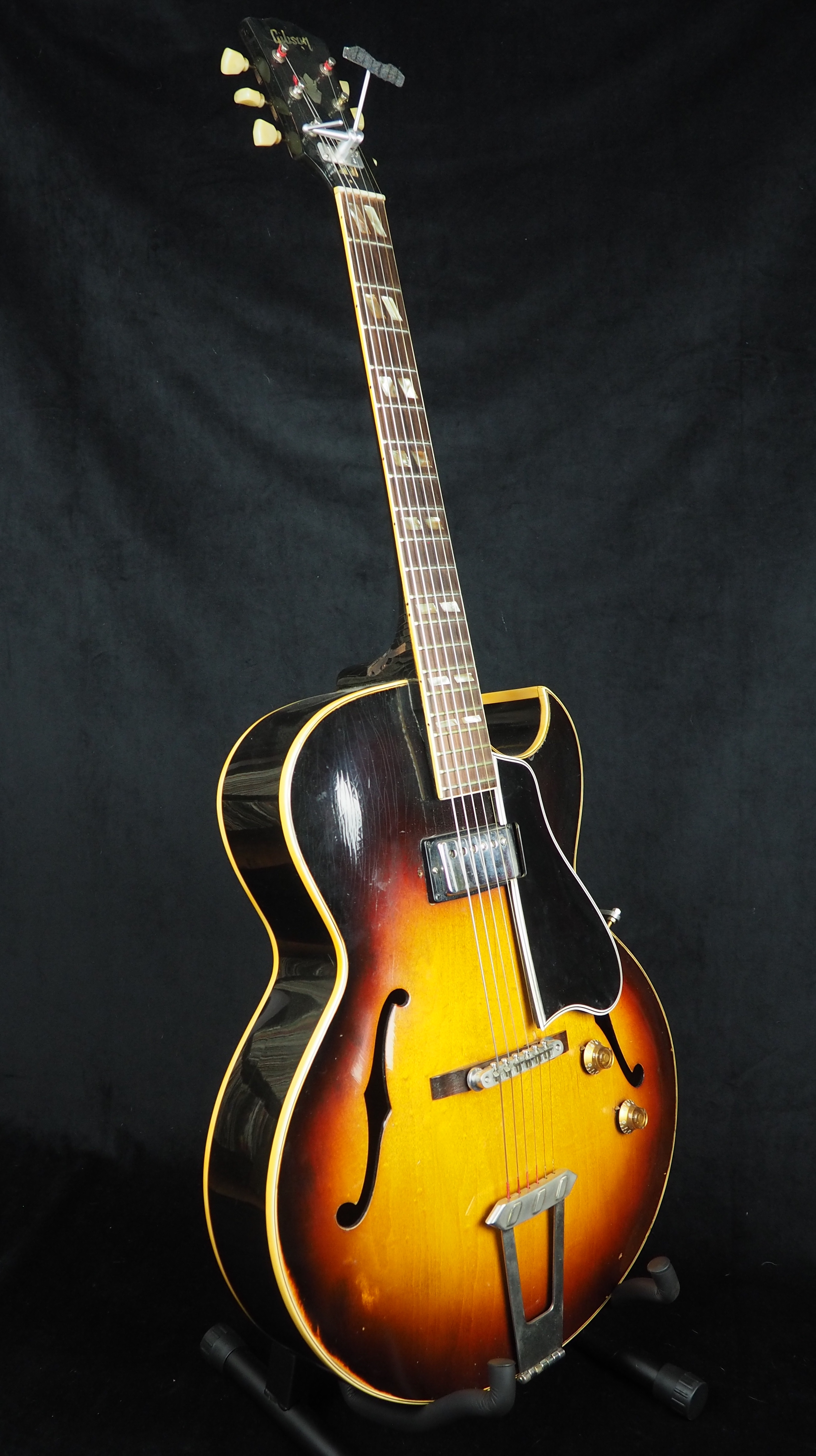
- Herb Ellis's 1953 Gibson ES-175
- Manufacturer: Gibson
- Period: 1949–2019

Construction
- Body type: Hollow
- Neck joint: Set

Woods
- Body: Maple laminate
- Neck: Mahogany
- Fretboard: Rosewood

Hardware
- Bridge: Wooden bridge with rosewood base
- Pickups: (1949–1953) One single-coil P-90 ES-175; (1953–1957) Two single-coil P-90s ES-175D; (1957–2019) one or two humbuckers ES-175 and ES-175D

Colors available
- Natural; Sunburst; Wine Red

The Gibson ES-175 (1949–2019) is a hollow body jazz electric guitar manufactured by the Gibson Guitar Corporation. The ES-175 became one of Gibson's most popular guitar designs.

== History ==
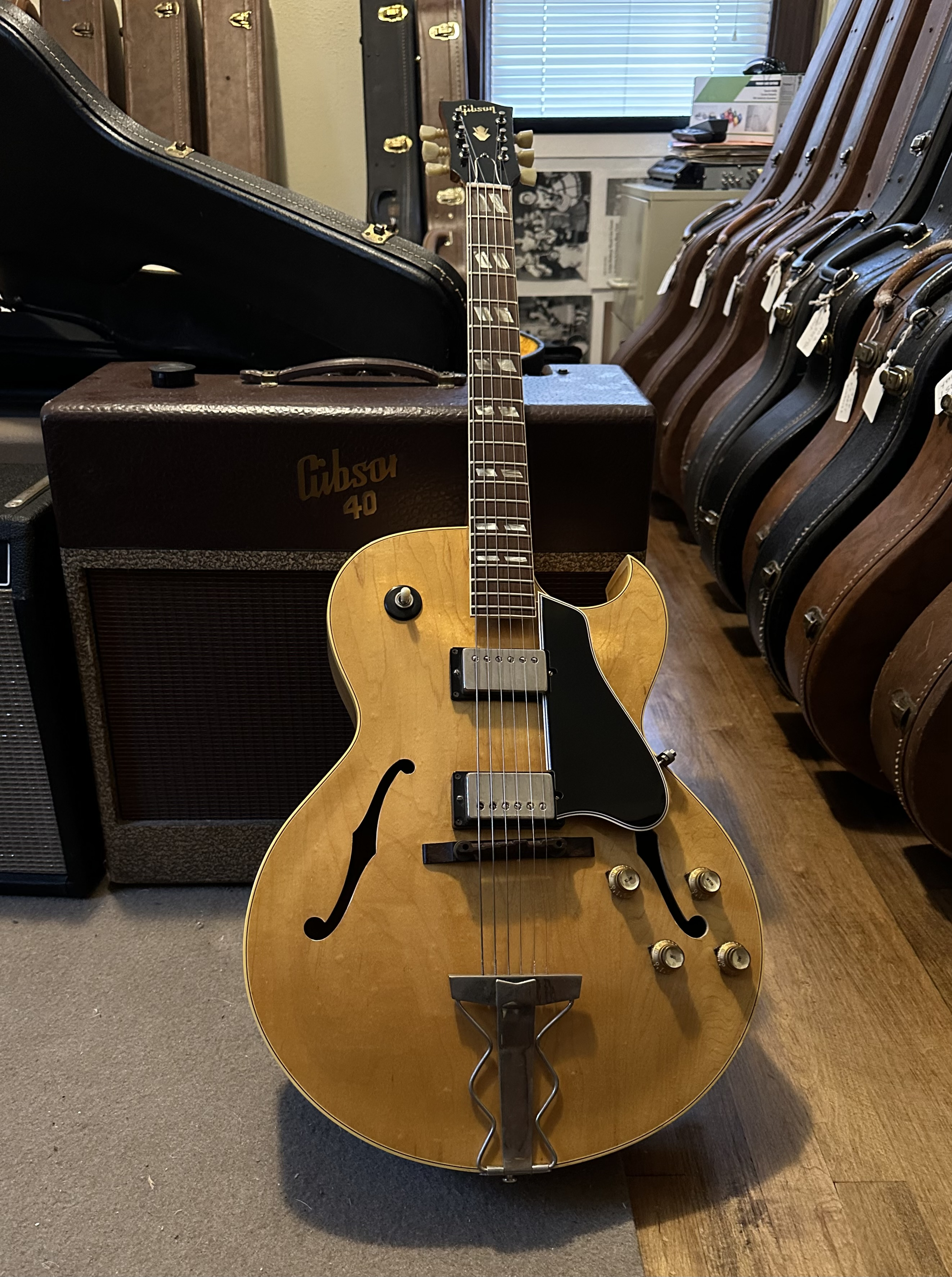
1963 Gibson ES-175DN - two pickup natural finish version

In 1949 the ES-175 was introduced by the Gibson Guitar company. It experienced immediate success and became one of Gibson's most popular guitar designs. In Adrian Ingram's book The Gibson ES175: Its History And Players he states that Gibson sold 37,000 of the guitars in its first fifty years of production. The first ES-175s were released with a sunburst finish and a retail price of $175.

From 1949 to 1953 ES-175s had one P-90 pickup. On July 31, 1953, Gibson released a two pickup version of the ES-175 with a "D" (175D) for double pickup.

Gibson discontinued this model in 2019.

== Specifications ==
The 175 was designed as a hollowbody electric archtop featuring a single florentine cutaway. The fretboard inlays were double parallelograms and the headstock featured inlays of the Gibson logo and 'crown'. The body was 3.375 in (8.57 cm) and it was 16.25 in (41.3 cm) at the lower bout. The guitar had a maple laminated top, back and sides, with a set-neck made of mahogany. The florentine cutaway on the 175 was seen as an improvement over the Venetian cutaway that Gibson had been using on guitars. The cutaway and the amplification of a jazz guitar allowed players to use the uppermost frets on the neck during performances. The 175 had a floating wooden bridge and a trapeze tailpiece.

The first versions had one single-coil P-90 pickup which was set close to the neck: there were two controls for volume and tone. In 1957 the ES-175 was offered with a choice of one or two of Gibson’s new Humbucker pickups. It was the first of Gibson's electric Spanish guitars to be outfitted with Gibson's new PAF humbucker.

== Reception ==
The guitar was one of Gibson's most successful models. The single pickup version was discontinued in 1971, but Gibson continued to produce the two pickup version.

== Notable players ==
- Geordie Walker
- Derek Bailey
- Herb Ellis
- John Frusciante
- Steve Howe
- Joe Pass
- Howard Roberts
- Jeremy Spencer of Fleetwood Mac
- Pat Metheny
- Wes Montgomery
- Jim Hall
- Shakey Graves
- Izzy Stradlin
- Masayuki Takayanagi
- Buck Dharma of Blue Öyster Cult

== Variations ==
- ES-165
- ES-295
- ES-775
