= Gibson ES-295 =

Hollow body guitar by Gibson, 1952 to 1959

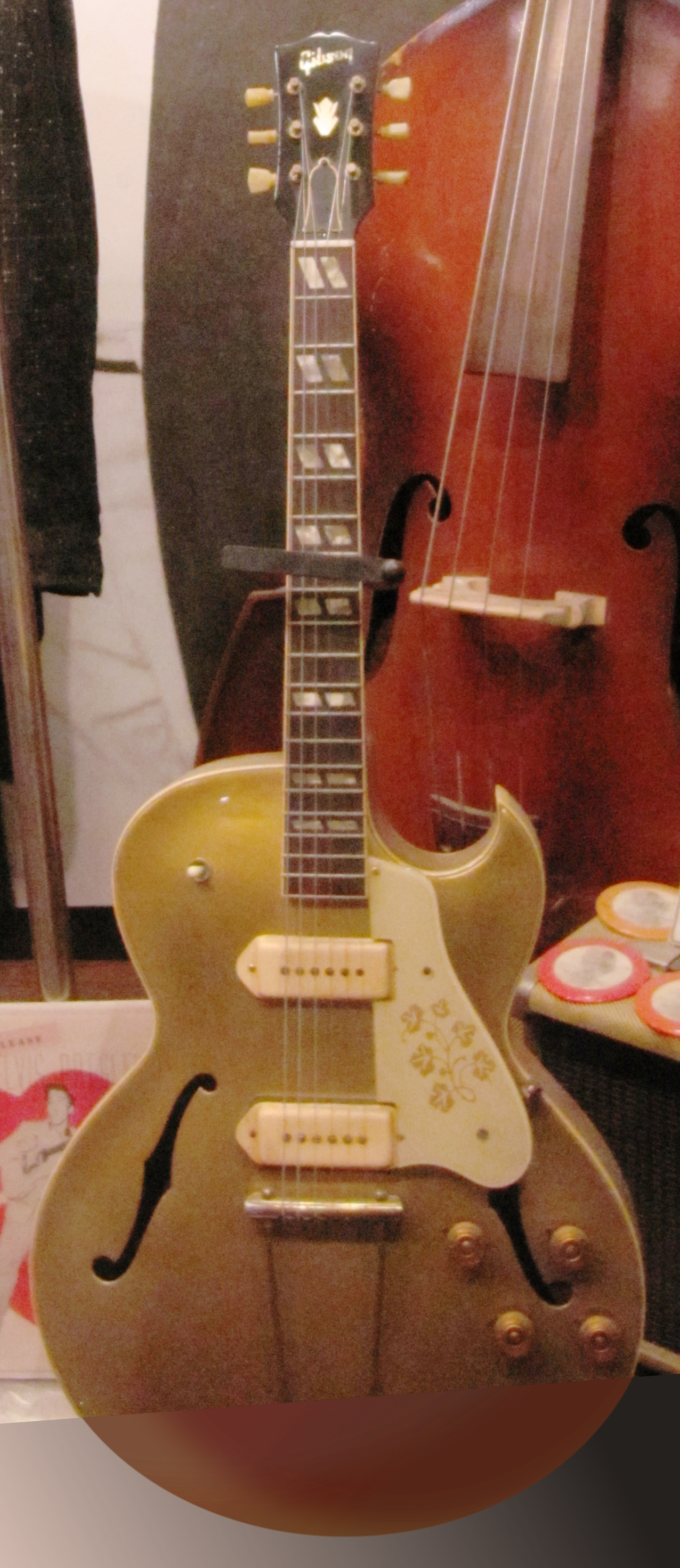
- Gibson ES-295 at Sun Studio
- Manufacturer: Gibson Brands
- Period: 1952-1959

Construction
- Body type: Hollow body
- Neck joint: Rounded 'C'
- Scale: 24.75"

Woods
- Body: Maple/Poplar/Maple
- Neck: Mahogany
- Fretboard: Rosewood

Hardware
- Bridge: Long Trapeze Bail Tailpiece (Les Paul's use the short version)
- Pickup: 2x Cream Dog Ear P90's

Colors available
- Bullion Gold, Sunburst, Cherry, Argentine Grey & Black

The Gibson ES-295 (1952–1959) is a hollow body guitar which was built by the Gibson Guitar Company. The ES-295 was introduced in May 1952 (only two prototypes were made in May 1952) as a fancier version of the ES-175. The ES-295 had the same measurements as the ES-175, but it came in Gibson's Bullion Gold finish and featured a combination long trapeze bridge/bail tailpiece with wrap-over bridge.

== History ==
In 1952 Les Paul has claimed responsibility for the creation of the ES-295. He is said to have called Gibson and told them to paint an ES-175 gold for a young man Les Paul met at a hospital. The first two prototype ES-295's were made in May 1952 for salesmen to take and show retailers for placing orders, the first factory run for the Gibson ES-295 started two months later in June 1952 with Factory Order Number (FON) batch Z1624 - the Z stands for the year 1952 and 1624 is the number of the first batch, made in June 1952. All ES-295s came from the Gibson Kalamazoo factory fitted with two cream P90 dog ear pickups. It was designed to be a full-sized hollowbody archtop which would sell alongside the solidbody Les Paul model. The original price of the ES-295 was $295. The guitar was discontinued in 1959.

The original 1952 to early 1953 ES-295's had a 19 fret neck, late 1953 onwards to 1959 had a 20 fret neck. 2x Cream dog ear P90s were fitted from 1952 to mid 1957 and then Humbuckers were fitted from late 1957 to the last few made in 1959.

In 1990 Gibson reissued the ES-295 but it was again discontinued in 1993. In 1999 Gibson again produced the ES-295, this time in a Scotty Moore signature model. In 2013 Gibson also released a reissue 1952 ES-295 but discontinued it again. In 2013 they also issued a limited run of 81 Scotty Moore signature editions built to the specs of his original 1952 guitar used on the Sun Studio recordings (all 81 of these were personally signed by Scotty Moore) with reproduction Lifton Cali-Girl case. In 2015 the Gibson Memphis Custom Shop released a run of 50 1952 Spec Gibson ES-295s in a 1960s cherry finish with reproduction Lifton Cali-Girl case and MHS (Memphis Historic Spec) dog ear P90s.

== Specifications ==
ES-295s came with the same wrap around (strings wrap over the top) long trapeze tailpiece that (the short trapeze with strings that wrap under the bridge) was standard on the first Les Paul Guitars. The whole guitar, including the neck, was finished in gold with ivory binding and floral pick-guard. The guitar had two single coil P-90s with cream colored pickup covers. The guitar had a three-way toggle switch with two tone knobs and two volume knobs. The metal parts were all finished in gold.

== Reception ==
The ES-295 did not sell well. By late 1957 Gibson changed the pickups from dog ear P-90s to Humbuckers. Some thought the gold color was a reason for the diminished interest in the ES-295. Gibson shipped some ES-295s in sunburst, Argentine Grey, Cherry & Black. The guitar was played by Elvis Presley's guitarist Scotty Moore in the early 1950s Sun Studio years.

== Notable players ==
- Joe Bonamassa
- Danny Gatton
- Scotty Moore
- Johnny Marr
- Geordie Walker
- Bryan Adams
- Diego García (Twanguero)
- Joel Paterson
- Roddy Frame (Aztec Camera)
- Featured prominently in the music video "Are You Jimmy Ray?"
