= Billy Byrd =

American musician (1920–2001)

- Byrd performing with Ernest Tubb's band in the 1950s (still frame from film clip)

Background information
- Born: William Lewis Byrd; 17 February 1920; Nashville, Tennessee, U.S.
- Died: 7 August 2001 (aged 81) Nashville, Tennessee, U.S.
- Genres: Country
- Occupation: Musician
- Instrument: Guitar
- Years active: 1938–1973
- Formerly of: Ernest Tubb, the Oak Ridge Quartet, Tex Ritter, George Hamilton IV, Jimmy Dickens

William Lewis Byrd (17 February 1920 – 7 August 2001) was an American guitarist and session musician who performed with Ernest Tubb, the Oak Ridge Quartet, Tex Ritter, George Hamilton IV, Jimmy Dickens and others. He helped to popularize the role of the electric lead guitarist in country music and, with fellow guitarist Hank Garland, was responsible for input into the design of the Gibson Byrdland guitar, a portmanteau of both players' last names.

== Biography ==
Byrd was born in Nashville, Tennessee and learned to play the guitar at 10 and appeared on radio playing with local bands whilst still in his teens. At the age of 18 he joined the house band at Nashville's WSM Grand Ole Opry and then worked with Herold Goodman and the Tennessee Valley Boys and Wally Fowler and his Georgia Clodhoppers before and after serving in World War II. In 1949 he commenced his most important association, that with Ernest Tubb as lead guitarist with the latter's Texas Troubadours, a position he occupied until 1959, followed by a second stint between 1969 and 1973, when he effectively retired from the music business.

A self-taught guitarist influenced by jazz players such as Charlie Christian and Django Reinhardt, he tutored a number of well-known Nashville session players including Hank Garland and Harold Bradley. With Tubb's band he favored simpler lead lines which can be heard on Tubb hits such as "Jealous Loving Heart," "Two Glasses Joe" and "Answer the Phone." Another side of his lasting legacy is the instrument that bears his name, the Gibson Byrdland thinline electric archtop guitar, developed with input from Byrd and fellow country/jazz guitarist Garland, which was in initial production from 1955 through 1969, and subsequently revived for limited runs several times later.

Taking a break from life on the road with Tubb, Byrd recorded several solo instrumental albums between 1959 and 1964 before returning to Tubb's band for a second stint in 1969 until retiring from life as a professional musician in 1973 to run a taxi company in Nashville. He died from natural causes in his home town of Nashville on August 7, 2001.

== Influence and guitar style ==
Byrd was one of the earliest and most widely known featured lead electric guitar players with a popular country outfit (other than the steel guitar players with western swing bands) and as such was influential in establishing this role in Nashville style country music. Although little of his jazz chops was on display in his featured lead breaks with Ernest Tubb, according to other Nashville players in his day he was considered the "best pop jazz player in town" and Harold Bradley (speaking for himself and Hank Garland) is quoted as saying: "Without him coming along and showing us that jazz stuff, we never would have been able to do what we did." In an essay on pedal steel great Buddy Emmons, who joined Ernest Tubb and the Texas Troubadours for a stint in 1958-1959, author Steve Fishell notes: "the Texas Troubadours - considered one of the top bands in country music - proved to be a perfect vehicle for jazzy swing instrumental ideas and arrangements. The band routinely sang and played at dances for two hours before Tubb was introduced, with Buddy and lead guitarist Billy Byrd leading the charge."

Some examples of Byrd's playing on his lead breaks are analysed by Sam Smiley on his instructional website at the page labelled "Billy Byrd Intro Solos".

== Instruments ==
Byrd initially favored Gibson archtop guitars and by the late 1940s was playing a Gibson L-7C. In 1949 he was on the waiting list for a new solid-body electric guitar from noted guitar maker Paul Bigsby and was informed that a novel, double-cutaway instrument initially constructed for guitarist Jimmy Bryant had become available since Bryant had entered an endorsement deal with Leo Fender and would no longer be taking it. This instrument, modified to prominently display Byrd's name instead of Bryant's, was then sold to Billy and became his featured instrument on recordings and film clips up until he took delivery of his own Byrdland guitar in 1955 (see below). This guitar was sold in the late 1950s to a Tulsa guitarist named Dick Ganders, and subsequently into a private collection on the U.S. East Coast, and is extensively documented in the section entitled "Jimmy Bryant / Billy Byrd Bigsby solid-body electric guitar #10749" on "The Bigsby Files" website.

From 1955 onwards, Byrd was associated extensively with the Gibson guitar named after himself and Hank Garland, the Byrdland, a thinline, electric, single cutaway archtop with a shortened scale that presaged Gibson's popular Gibson ES-335 thinline series by several years. Byrd is believed to have received instrument #1, while Garland received #2 and subsequently also #3 which was supplied in a custom cherry sunburst finish. Later, Gibson also produced what was apparently a special order double cutaway version of the Byrdland for Billy's use, reverting to a standard scale length, which can be seen on the cover of 1964's "The Golden Guitar of Billy Byrd" and was later on loan to, and displayed at, the Country Music Hall of Fame in Nashville. In his later years he was also pictured at home playing a late-1960s Standel guitar which he claimed was his favorite.

== Discography ==
=== with Ernest Tubb ===
...any record cut between 1949 and 1959; especially 2 Bear Family Ernest Tubb compilation boxes covering this period

=== solo ===
- I Love a Guitar (Warner Bros., 1959)
- Lonesome Country Songs (Reprise, 1961)
- included on various artists: Tennessee Guitar (Starday, 1962)
- Gospel Guitar (Scripture Records, 196?)
- The Golden Guitar Of Billy Byrd (compilation) (Warner Bros., 1964)
