= Gibson Byrdland =

Electric guitar made by Gibson

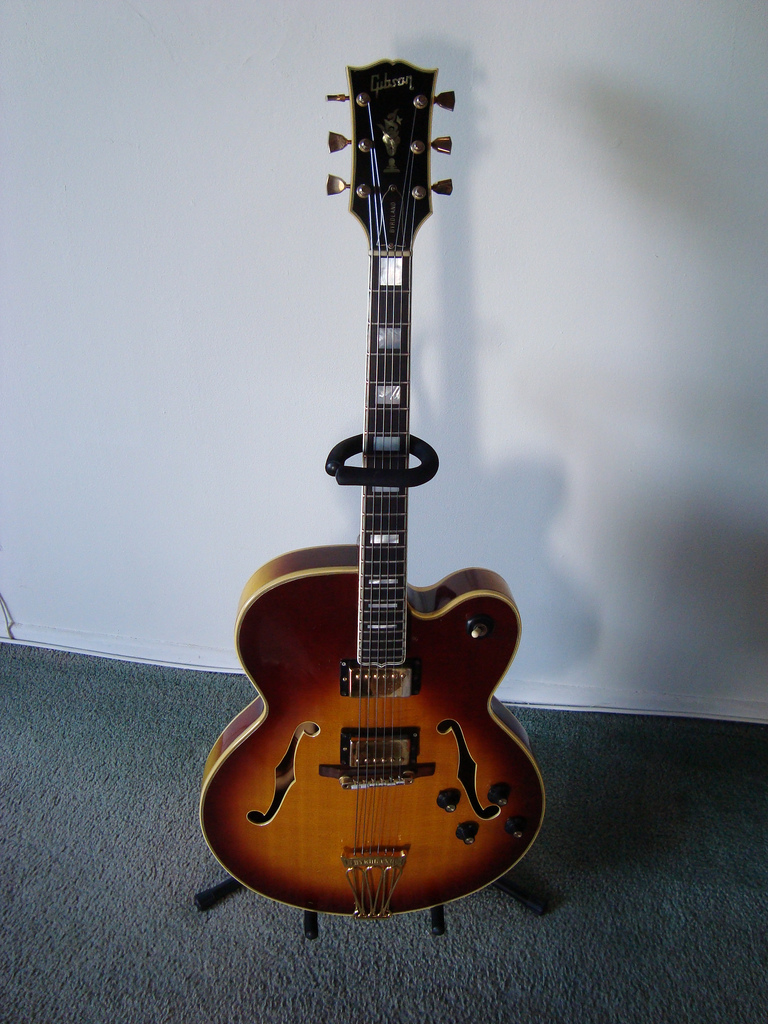
- 1969 Gibson Byrdland, Sunburst finish
- Manufacturer: Gibson
- Period: 1955–75; 1977, 1978, 1992

Construction
- Body type: Hollow body
- Neck joint: Set
- Scale: 23 1/2 in (60 cm)

Woods
- Body: Spruce top, maple body
- Neck: Maple
- Fretboard: Ebony with pearl block inlay

Hardware
- Bridge: Tune-o-matic
- Pickup(s): Alnico (1955-58), Gibson Humbucker (1958–)

Colors available
- Sunburst, Black or Natural (most common)

The Byrdland is an electric guitar made by Gibson. Its name derives from the names of guitarists Billy Byrd and Hank Garland for whom Gibson originally custom-built the guitar.

== Thinline series ==
The Byrdland is the first of Gibson's thinline series. Many guitarists did not desire the bulk of a traditional archtop guitar such as Gibson's L-5, one of Gibson's top models. The Byrdland, with its overall depth of 2 1/4 in (5.7 cm), is thinner than the L-5's 3 3/8 in (8.6 cm) depth. Gibson's president, Ted McCarty, sought opinions and ideas about new products. The suggestions from Byrd and Garland led to the development of the Byrdland. The Byrdland, first made in 1955, is essentially a custom-built, thinner, L-5CES (Cutaway-Electric-Spanish). Later, the two specified a shorter scale and narrower-than-standard neck. Guitarists who had an opportunity to play Gibson samples liked the Byrdland's short scale neck (23 1/2 in [60 cm]), which facilitated intricate single-note patterns and unusual stretched chord voicings. The Byrdland then became a regular production instrument. One thing which hampered the instrument's popularity in the ensuing years was the narrow neck width (1 5/8 in [4.1 cm] at the nut, as opposed to Gibson's standard nut width of 1 11/16 in [4.3 cm]). Gibson developed the ES-350T from the Byrdland using less-costly hardware and detailing, and offered it as a less expensive model. While that model was also designed with jazz guitarists in mind, it became synonymous with Rock 'n Roll star Chuck Berry through the late 1950s.

From 1955 to 1960, Gibson made the Byrdland with a rounded Venetian cutaway. (The illustration shows the Venetian style.) From 1961 to 1968, it used the sharp-edged Florentine cutaway, returning to the Venetian in 1969. The model was in production from 1955 through early 1969 with the narrow nut width. In 1969, the nut width was changed to the standard 1 11/16 in (4.3 cm), although some 1970s examples were produced with the narrower width.

In the mid-1960s, guitarist Ted Nugent began using a Byrdland, an unusual choice considering Nugent's high-volume style of music. The hollow-bodied design of the guitar caused feedback at higher levels of gain and volume, which would normally make it impractical for hard rock and similar styles, but Nugent controlled this feedback and incorporated it into his playing.

British guitar player John McLaughlin used a sunburst Byrdland with a scalloped fretboard. Other famous Byrdland players are Anthony Wilson, Louie Shelton, David T. Walker and James Blood Ulmer.

The guitar is currently available as part of Gibson's Custom Series and is made with the Florentine cutaway. In 1976 only, Gibson offered a twelve-string version, but made fewer than 20.

The famous jazz club, Birdland, filed a lawsuit against Gibson over the name. The court dismissed the suit when Gibson showed that the name was made up from the names of two people.

== Notable Byrdland players ==
- Ted Nugent
- Jim McCarty
- Billy Byrd & Hank Garland (after whom the guitar is named)
- James Blood Ulmer
- David T. Walker
- Eric Clapton
- Roy Clark
