= Bergen Wave =

Norwegian modern music movement

The Bergen Wave (Norwegian: Bergensbølgen) is an expression often used by Norwegian media regarding the city of Bergen, Norway, as a platform for the development of modern music, illustrating a period in time where a new generation of artists from Bergen "took over" the musical landscape in Norway.

== History ==
The expression was initially used in the early 1990s and would later re-emerge several times throughout the 2000s. The "Bergen Wave" is mostly a name coined by the mass media, while the artists themselves have expressed distaste for the term and consider it a cliché.

Several artists from the "Bergen Wave" gained international breakthroughs, an uncommon feat for Norwegian music at that time. Much of this success came from the focus that particularly British music press put on bands such as Röyksopp and Kings of Convenience, and on the small Bergen-based record label Tellé Records. Many of the artists shared an independent approach to promoting their music, often relying on networking and word-of-mouth reputation rather than the aid of major music labels to help with their breakthrough. Musically, several of the bands shared a low-key melancholic tone, regardless of genre.

Towards the end of the 1990s, Tellé Records and its sub-labels started releasing singles by then-unknown artists such as Röyksopp, Annie, Ralph Myers & The Jack Herren Band, Erot and Kings of Convenience. A majority of the singles were picked up by music press and major labels abroad, leading to the international recognition of Bergen's music scene. The success of the Bergen-based artists of the nineties gave the scene a confidence boost and, as a result, a new wave of artists and labels quickly emerged. The "second wave" of artists were notably represented by Sondre Lerche, Datarock, Magnet, Ane Brun, Casiokids, Matias Tellez and Ungdomskulen.

== Notable artists ==
- Kings of Convenience
- Röyksopp
- Ralph Myerz and the Jack Herren Band
- Annie
- Bjørn Torske
- Erlend Øye
- Rubies
- Familjen
- King Midas
- Evil Tordivel
- Razika
- Pogo Pops
- Poor Rich Ones
- Ephemera
- Sondre Lerche
- Magnet
- Nathalie Nordnes
- Kakkmaddafakka
- Casiokids
- Fjorden Baby!
- John Olav Nilsen & Gjengen
- Lars Vaular
- Young Dreams
- Real Ones
- Popium
- Sister Sonny

== See also ==
- Tromsø techno scene
