= Legao =

Studio album by Erlend Øye
- Released: October 3, 2014
- Recorded: 2013–2014
- Genre: indie folk indie pop
- Length: 38:00
- Label: Bubbles Records

Erlend Øye chronology
DJ-Kicks: Erlend Øye (2004)	Legao (2014)	Quarantine At El Ganzo (2020)

Professional ratings
Review scores
Source	Rating
AllMusic	4/5 stars
Nothing but Hope and Passion	3/5 stars

Legao is the second solo album from Kings of Convenience and The Whitest Boy Alive singer Erlend Øye, recorded in Reykjavík with Hjálmar, a reggae group from Iceland. It was preceded by a video for the single "Garota" shot in Seoul. The record was released by the label Bubbles Records on 3 October 2014. The album peaked at #51 in Germany, #72 in Switzerland, and #144 in Belgium.

== Track listing ==
1. "Fence Me In"
2. "Garota"
3. "Say Goodbye"
4. "Peng Pong"
5. "Bad Guy Now"
6. "Who Do You Report To"
7. "Whistler"
8. "Save Some Loving"
9. "Rainman"
10. "Lies Become Part of Who You Are"

== Credits ==
- Þorsteinn Einarsson (guitar)
- Sigurður Halldór Guðmundsson (hammond organ)
- Guðmundur Kristinn Jónsson (guitar)
- Valdimar Kolbeinn Sigurjónsson (bass)
- Helgi Svavar Helgason (drums)
- Mathias Hemstock (percussion)
- Erlend Øye (vocals)
- Guðmundur Kristinn Jónsson (mix)
- Bo Kondren (mastering)
- Norman Nietzsche (mix)

== Music video ==
- "Garota", directed by Michael Beech
- "Rainman", directed by Clara Cebria
