= Six Months Is a Long Time =

Studio album by Kakkmaddafakka
- Released: 28 June 2013
- Studio: Soundtank K1 Studios (Berlin, Germany)
- Genre: Pop
- Length: 40:21
- Label: Bubbles Records
- Producer: Erlend Øye

Kakkmaddafakka chronology
Hest (2011)	Six Months Is a Long Time (2013)	KMF (2016)

Singles from Six Months Is a Long Time
- 1. "Someone New"; 2. "Forever Alone"; 3. "Young"

Professional ratings
Review scores
Source	Rating
Gaffa	3/6 stars

Six Months Is a Long Time is the third studio album by Norwegian indie rock band Kakkmaddafakka. It was released on 28 June 2013. The album's cover art is the painting Portrait of Emma Jane Hodges, a work of the painter Charles Howard Hodges, dated 1815.

== Track listing ==
All music and lyrics written by Kakkmaddafakka; except "Gangsta No More" written by Erlend Øye.

Six Months Is a Long Time track listing
No.	Title	Length
1.	"Young"	3:21
2.	"Someone New"	3:02
3.	"Lie"	3:54
4.	"Forever Alone"	4:16
5.	"Saviour"	3:05
6.	"Bill Clinton"	3:44
7.	"No Song"	2:43
8.	"Female Dyslexic"	2:58
9.	"Never Friends"	4:53
10.	"Gangsta No More"	3:28
11.	"All About You"	5:05

== Personnel ==
=== Kakkmaddafakka ===
- Axel Vindenes - vocals, guitar
- Pål Vindenes - vocals, guitar
- Stian Sævig - bass, backing vocals
- Kristoffer Van Der Pas - drums, backing vocals
- Jonas Nielsen - piano
- Lars Helmik Raaheim-Olsen - percussion, backing vocals

=== Technical ===
- Erlend Øye – producer
- Norman Nitzsche – mixing
- Bo Kondren – mastering
