= Pogo Pops =

Norwegian pop rock band

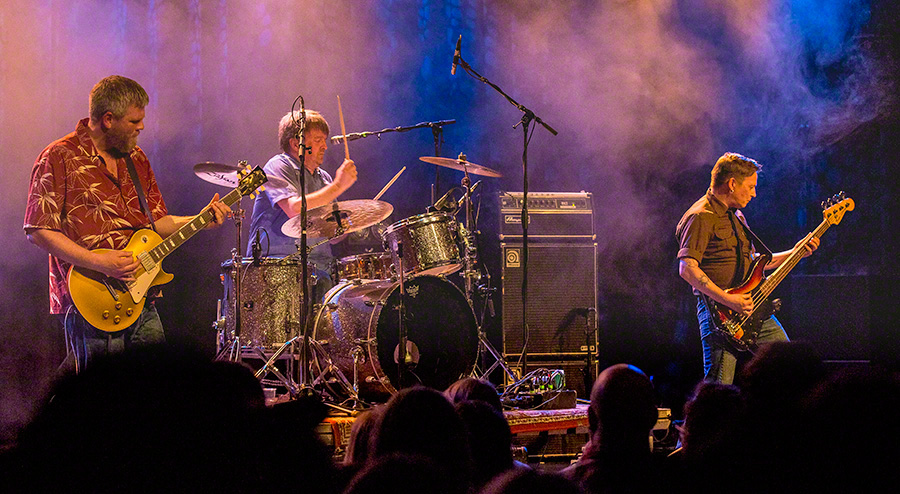
- Pogo Pops at a concert in 2016

Background information
- Also known as: The Doomsville Boys
- Origin: Bergen, Norway
- Genres: Pop music
- Years active: 1987–1996, 2006–2022
- Labels: Norsk Plateproduksjon; Doomsville records Apollon records Sony BMG
- Members: Frank Hammersland; Viggo Krüger; Nicolai Hamre

Pogo Pops (established in 1987 under the name of The Doomsville Boys) was a pop rock band from Bergen, Norway. The band split up in 1996 after four albums, but reformed in 2006.

== Biography ==
The Doomsville Boys were a trio and released an EP in 1989 containing six songs. The band changed its name to Pogo Pops in 1990 after Domenic O'Fahey joined. Pogo Pops is often considered the band that defined the Bergen Wave, followed by artists like Kings of Convenience and Röyksopp. Led by Frank Hammersland, the band released four albums in the 1990s, all of them dominated by Hammersland's melodious pop rock. The band was well received by the critics, but only attained moderate commercial success, and Hammersland dissolved the band in 1996. Hammersland released a solo album which was also very well received by critics but didn't sell very well, before he started the band Popium with several musician friends from Bergen. Popium continued the pop rock style of Pogo Pops.

Pogo Pops was reunited in 2006 for a series of concerts and a compilation album. On 14 September 2009, Pogo pops released their new album Where the action is at pogopops.com. They also released an outtakes album containing 11 previously unreleased songs as well as a digital version of their Doomsville boys EP from 1989. During 2010, Pogo Pops played several concerts, including the opening of Rockheim, Norway's national museum for rock and pop music. Pogo pops released their sixth studio album, titled Darling Emm, Northern Girl (Doomsville records/VME), in 2012. In 2017 the album Love is the greatest compass was released, while the last album from Pogo Pops, Daylight, came in 2022.

== Band members ==
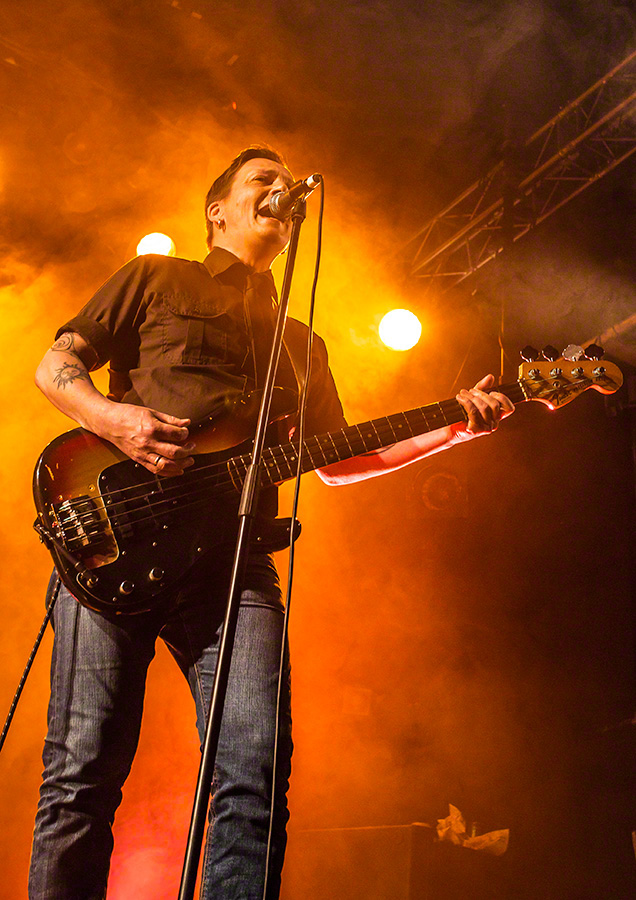
Frank Hammersland in concert in 2016

- Frank Hammersland
- Viggo Krüger
- Nicolai Hamre

== Honors ==
- 1993: Spellemannprisen in the class Pop band for the album Crash

== Discography ==
Albums

- 1992: Pop Trip (Norsk Plateproduksjon)
- 1993: Crash (Norsk Plateproduksjon)
- 1995: Pure (Norsk Plateproduksjon)
- 1996: Surf (Norsk Plateproduksjon/BMG)
- 2009: Where the action is (Doomsville records)
- 2009: Outtakes (Doomsville records)
- 2012: Darling Emm, Northern Girl (Doomsville records/VME)
- 2013: Lost and found (Rec 90 Norway)
- 2017: Love is the greatest compass (Apollon records)
- 2022: Daylight (Apollon records)

EP's

- 1989/2009: Doomsville boys EP (Doomsville records)

Compilations

- 1989: Det perfekte menneske (Het Vinyl)
- 1994: Absolute music 13 (Eva records)
- 1995: Absolute music 16 (Eva records)
- 1994: Med blanke ark - Sanger av Alf Prøysen (Polygram/Universal)
- 1996: Ellediller og krokofanter - en hyllest til Knutsen og Ludvigsen (Progress)
- 2006: The Very Best Of (Sony music)
- 2010: 5071 – Sånn det è - Samleplate med artister fra Loddefjord (5071 kulturforsyning)

Tribute to Alf Prøysen

- 1994: Med Blanke Ark - Sanger av Alf Prøysen (Universal Music) various artists ("Mannen På Holdeplassen")

Awards
Preceded by Bel Canto	Recipient of the Pop Band Spellemannprisen; 1993	Succeeded by Tre Små Kinesere
