= Quarantine at El Ganzo =

Studio album by Sebastian Maschat and Erlend Øye
- Released: 31 July 2020
- Recorded: Spring–Summer 2020
- Studios: Hotel El Ganzo, San José del Cabo, Mexico
- Genre: Indie pop
- Length: 44:54
- Label: Bubbles Records

Sebastian Maschat and Erlend Øye chronology
Rules (2009)	Quarantine at El Ganzo (2020)

Quarantine at El Ganzo is a joint solo album by European musicians Sebastian Maschat and Erlend Øye, both members of the German-Norwegian dance-rock band The Whitest Boy Alive. It was recorded spontaneously during the COVID-19 pandemic at the Hotel El Ganzo in Mexico, after a planned recording session for new The Whitest Boy Alive material had to be abandoned due to the pandemic. It was released digitally on 31 July 2020 on Bubbles Records, the indie label set up by Erlend Øye and Marcin Öz in 2006.

== Background ==
After a short round of reunion shows the autumn before, The Whitest Boy Alive released "Serious", their first new song in over a decade, in March 2020, and were booked to play a festival in Mexico. The members of the band, who had been spending the winter in different parts of the world, arrived separately in Mexico over the course of March, only for the growing COVID-19 crisis to led to the festival's cancellation the day before it was due to take place. Furthermore, outgoing flights were cancelled, preventing the band from returning home immediately. The band were invited to record another new song at the Hotel El Ganzo in San José del Cabo over the course of a few days, but travel restrictions put in place by Baja California Sur made it impossible for members Marcin Öz and Daniel Nentwig, who had been staying in Mexico City, to join Maschat and Øye for the already-booked recording session. After deciding that working remotely would not suit the band's dynamic, Öz and Nentwig returned to Europe, and one of the Hotel El Ganzo's owners, Bear Kittay, invited the remaining members to stay and use the studio indefinitely. Maschat and Øye enlisted other musicians isolated in the resort city to record solo material by both of them. The songs were written over a long period, with some tracks new, and others reworked from previously shelved ideas dating back by as much as 15 years, long before the band's initial 2014 split; Erlend Øye had previously attempted to record "Price" as part of the duo Kings of Convenience, and later with the Sicilian trio La Comitiva who he had recently collaborated with, but did not find the results satisfactory.

After Maschat and Øye returned home during the summer, as permitted, the album's existence was revealed on 20 July by Bubble Records via a series of social media posts simultaneously announcing the 31 July release date. Clara Cebriárn provided the artwork, as the hotel's "Visual Artist in Residence" for the period. A music video for the song 'Quarantime' was later produced using footage submitted by fans illustrating their experiences under the restrictions during the pandemic, premiering on YouTube on 13 September the same year.

== Personnel ==
The session band for the album were named 'Caged Dolphins'.

- Erlend Øye - Vocals, guitar, producer
- Sebastian Maschat - Vocals, flute, trombone, keys, harmonium, percussion
- Bear Kittay, hotel owner - Guitars, sitar, backing vocals
- Paco Rosas, the studio's sound engineer - Bass, recording and mixing engineer
- Jorge Aguilar, The Whitest Boy Alive's tour manager and booking agent for Mexico - Drums, percussion, harmonium
- Clara Cebrián, a visual artist, who previously animated the music video for Øye's 2014 single "Rainman" - guest vocalist on "Keycard"

== Track listing ==
No.	Title	Music	Lead vocals	Length
1.	"Wipeout"	Sebastian Maschat	Maschat and Øye	3:57
2.	"Wedding Song"	Erlend Øye	Øye	2:41
3.	"On Lover's Lane"	Sebastian Maschat	Maschat	3:33
4.	"Price"	Erlend Øye	Øye	3:48
5.	"Within a Dream"	Sebastian Maschat	Maschat and Øye	4:06
6.	"Butterflies"	Erlend Øye	Øye	1:57
7.	"Dharma"	Sebastian Maschat	Maschat	2:02
8.	"Only Just Begun"	Erlend Øye	Øye	4:41
9.	"Magic Used to Happen"	Sebastian Maschat	Maschat	4:16
10.	"Bad Influence"	Erlend Øye	Øye	3:29
11.	"Distant Lover"	Sebastian Maschat	Maschat	3:18
12.	"Quarantime"	Erlend Øye	Øye	3:09
13.	"Credits"			1:33
14.	"Keycard"	Erlend Øye	Clara Cebrián, Bear Kittay, Øye	2:19
Total length:				44:54

Track 13 is a spoken-word track featuring each of the musicians listing their role on the album, en lieu of the liner notes of a physical release.
