= Kakkmaddafakka =

Norwegian rock band

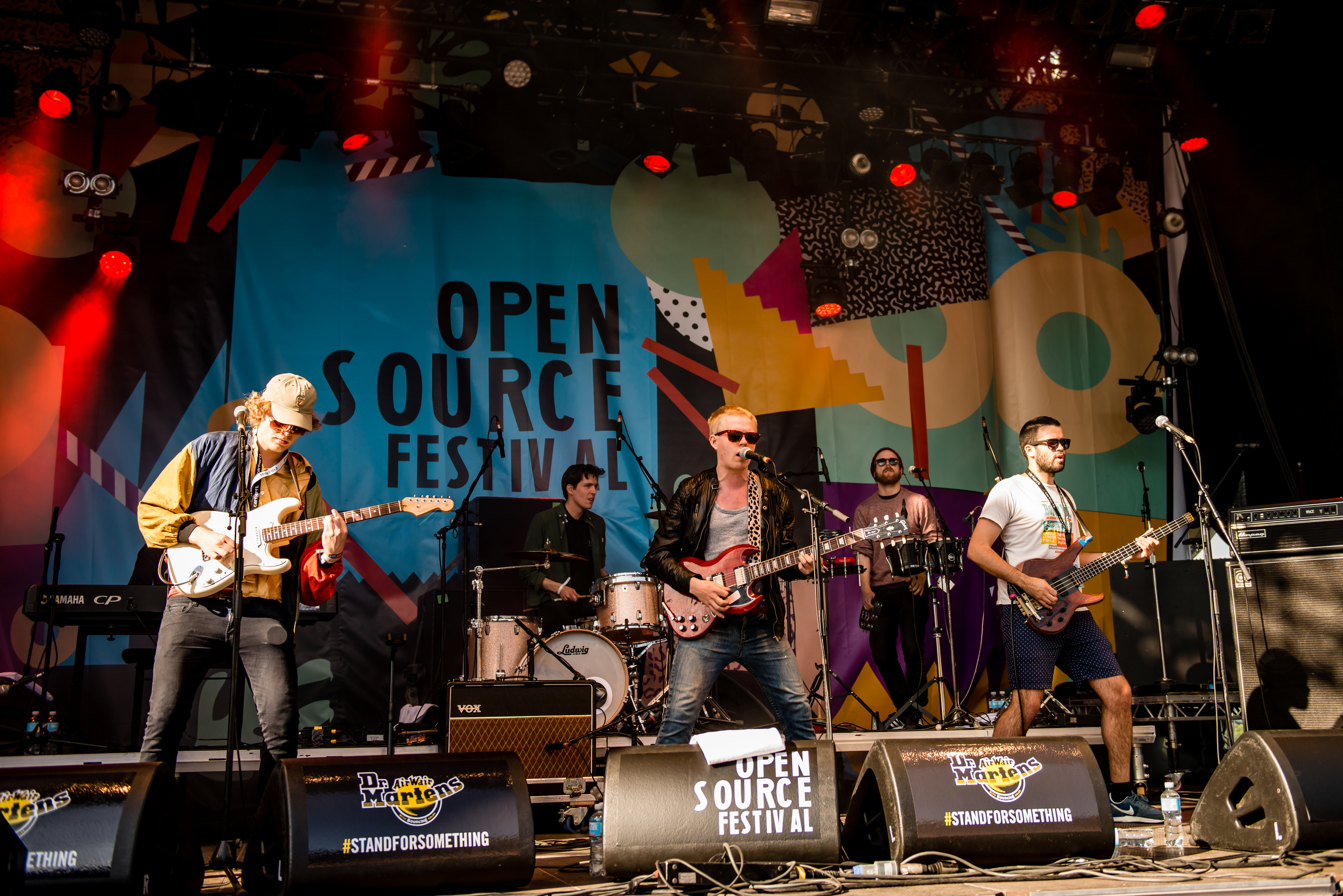
- Kakkmaddafakka performing at Open Source Festival on 27 June 2015

Background information
- Origin: Bergen, Norway
- Genres: Indie rock, pop, indie R&B
- Years active: 2004–present
- Labels: Bergen Mafia Records, Bubbles, Sounds Gold
- Members: Axel Vindenes; Pål Vindenes; Stian Sævig; Kristoffer Wie van der Pas; Sebastian Kittelsen
- Website: www.kmfband.com

Kakkmaddafakka (KMF) is a Norwegian indie rock band formed and based in Bergen. They are known for their high energy live performances.

The band is one of many artists who emerged from Bergen, which the Norwegian press has called the "New Bergen Wave", as it is reminiscent of the many successful bands that emerged from Bergen in the late 1990s and the early 2000s.

== History ==
=== Formation and Down to Earth (2004–2007) ===
The band was formed by brothers Axel and Pål Vindenes, together with school friends Jonas Nielsen and Stian Sævig in 2004. All classically trained musicians, the band was formed to play a one-off show at a local youth centre, Ungdomshuset 1880, but after positive response the band continued to play many live shows around Norway. In 2006, the band made their first recording and released the EP Already Your Favourite EP which was produced by Matias Tellez.

Kakkmaddafakka released its first LP Down to Earth on 24 September 2007, which reached number twenty on the VG Topp30 Album list and brought the band nationwide attention in their native Norway, despite a largely negative critical response.

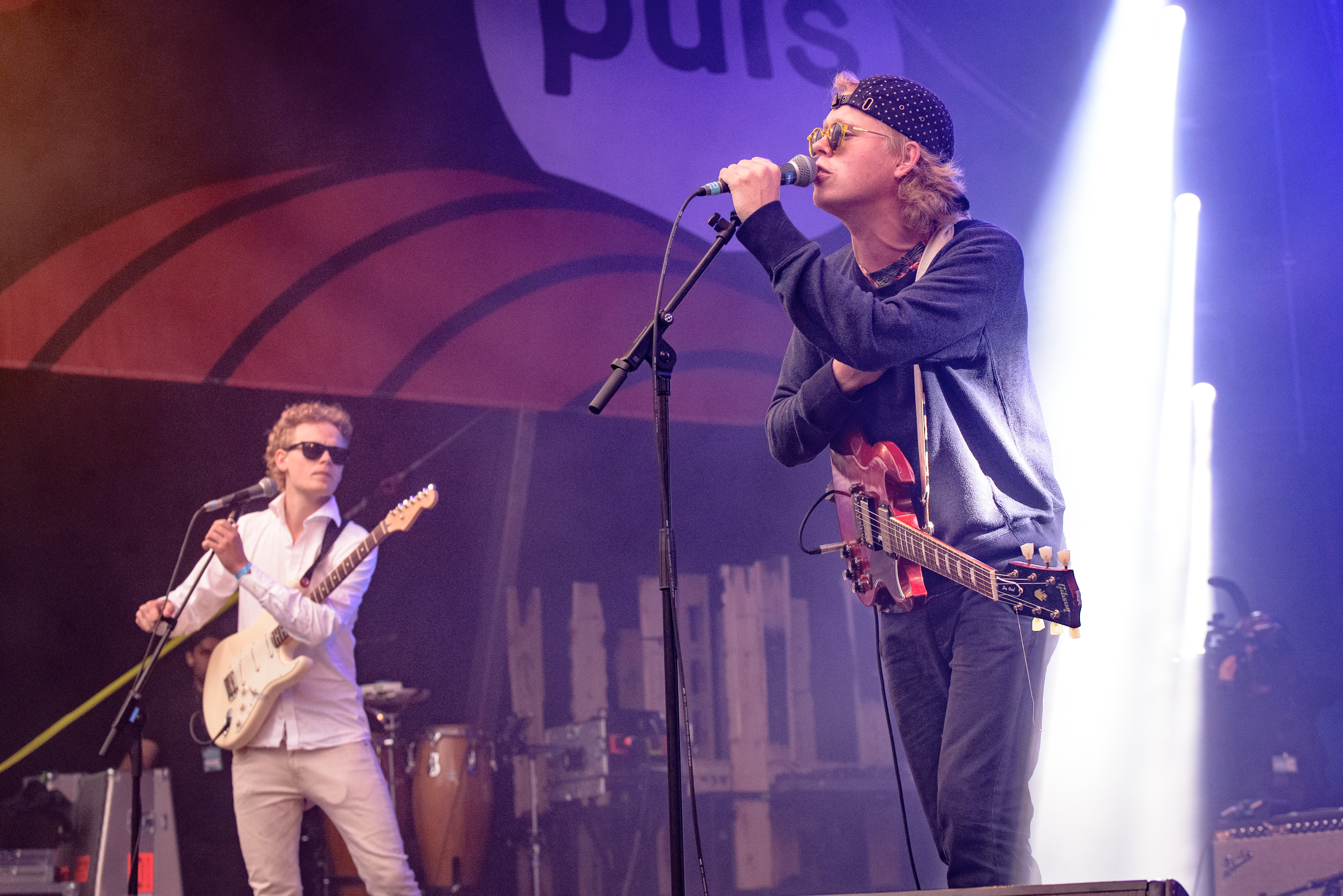
Pål Vindenes and Axel Vindenes at Puls Open Air festival in Germany in 2016

=== Hest and Six Months is a Long Time (2011–2013) ===
On 25 February 2011, Kakkmaddafakka released their second album Hest. The album was produced by Erlend Øye and released on the label Bubbles. The first single taken from the album was "Restless".

On 28 June 2013, the band released their third album Six Months Is a Long Time. It was again produced by Erlend Øye and released on Universal Music Germany, featuring the singles "Someone New", "Young" and "Forever Alone".

In early 2014, pianist and founder member Jonas Nielsen left the band and was replaced by Sebastian Emin Kittelsen.

=== KMF and Hus (2016–2017) ===
The band released their fourth album titled KMF on 18 March 2016. One year later Kakkmaddafakka released their fifth album Hus. In 2017, after 12 years playing in the band, the guitarist and singer Pål Vindenes started a parallel solo project under the name Pish. In January 2018, the band released the single "Incorruptible".

=== Diplomacy and Ontas? (2019–2020) ===
In March 2019, Kakkmaddafakka released their sixth album Diplomacy. It is less indie than previous albums and is more in the direction of arena rock. The album included the singles "Naked Blue" and "Runaway Girl". In April 2020, the band released the EP Ontas?. A music video was made for the song "Baby" from the EP.

== Band members ==
Members

- Axel Vindenes - vocals, guitar
- Pål Vindenes Pish - vocals, guitar, cello
- Stian Sævig - bass, backing vocals, vocals
- Kristoffer Van Der Pas - drums, backing vocals
- Sebastian Kittelsen - piano

Former members

- Jonas Nielsen - piano, vocals
- Lars Helmik Raaheim-Olsen - percussion, backing vocals

== Discography ==
=== Albums ===
- Down to Earth (2007)
- Hest (2011)
- Six Months Is a Long Time (2013)
- KMF (2016)
- Hus (2017)
- Diplomacy (2019)
- Revelation (2022)
- Untitled (2026)

=== EPs ===
- Already Your Favourite EP (2007)
- Ontas? (2020)
