= Avenue D =

Avenue D may refer to:

- Avenue D (Brooklyn), an avenue in Brooklyn, New York City
- Avenue D (Manhattan), an avenue in Manhattan, New York City
- "Avenue D", performed by Etta James for the Rooftops (film) soundtrack 1989
- Avenue D (band), an American electroclash duo
