= Eirik Glambek Bøe =

Norwegian musician

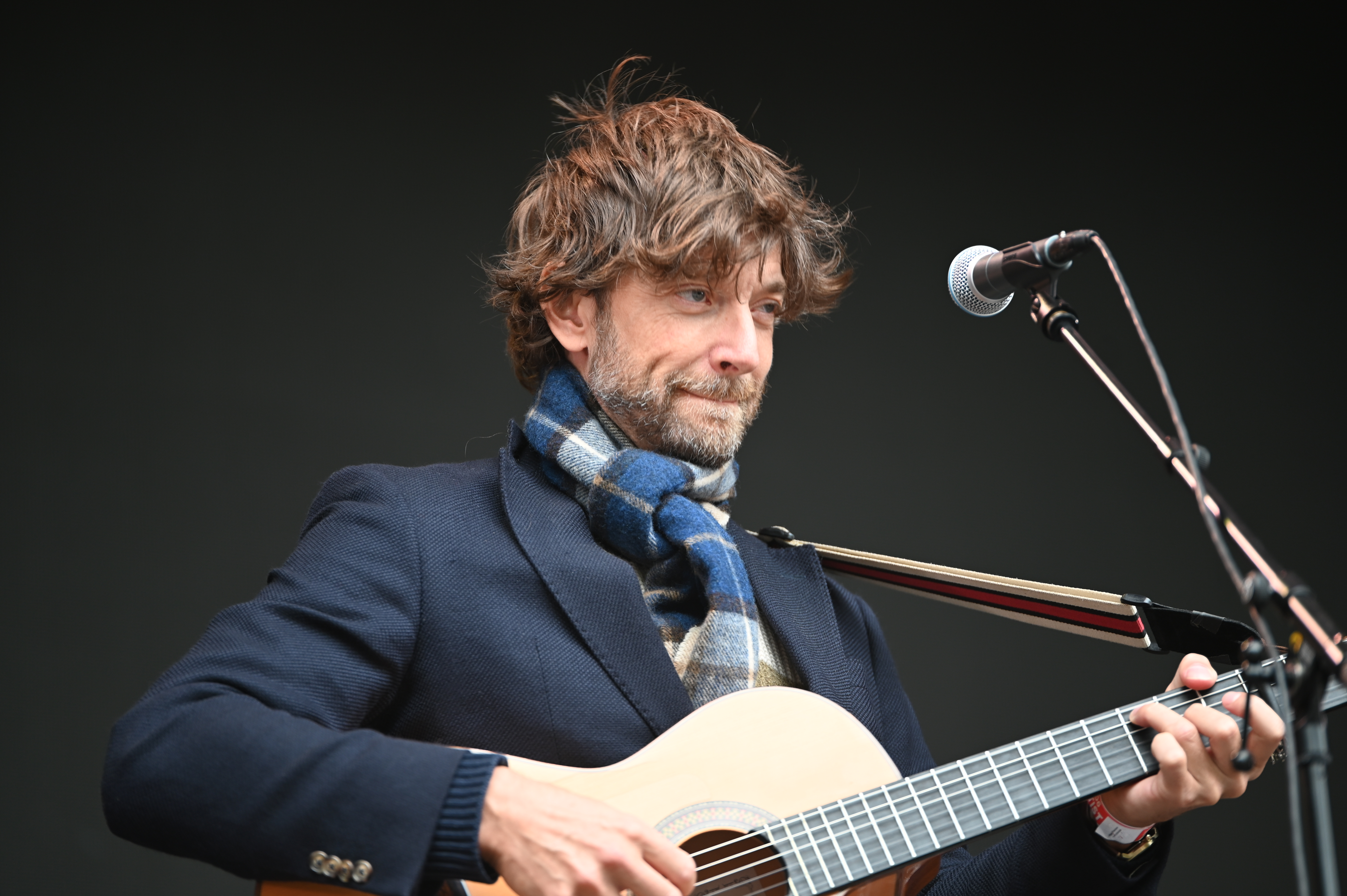
- Eirik playing concert with Kings of Convenience

Background information
- Born: Eirik Glambek Bøe; 25 October 1975 (age 50)
- Origin: Bergen, Norway
- Genres: Alternative dance, electronic, indie folk, indie pop, synthpop
- Occupations: Composer, musician, producer, singer, songwriter
- Instruments: Vocals, guitar, bass guitar, piano
- Years active: 1996–present
- Labels: !K7, Astralwerks, Bubbles Records, EMI, Service, Virgin
- Spouse: Ina Grung (div.)

Eirik Glambek Bøe (born 25 October 1975) is a Norwegian musician, writer and vocalist, best known for being part of the indie folk duo Kings of Convenience with Erlend Øye. He has a degree in psychology from the University of Bergen. Although his native language is Norwegian, many of his writings are in English.

He formed the band Skog together with Øye in the 1990s. They formed Kings of Convenience in 1998 and released their first album Quiet Is The New Loud in 2001 (the same year Øye featured in Röyksopp's critically acclaimed debut album Melody A.M.). The duo then went on to release the single Toxic Girl followed by their second album Riot on an Empty Street in 2004.

In 2006 he featured in Øye's band The Whitest Boy Alive, and at a lesser degree Kommode, largely made up of the members of Skog.

In a rare guest appearance on NPR, Bøe sings on the track "How My Heart Behaves" on Feist's 2007 The Reminder.

In October 2009 Kings of Convenience released their third studio album Declaration of Dependence on Astralwerks.

In 2017, Bøe led Kommode alongside Øystein Gjærder Bruvik and released Analog Dance Music, an album that "lets the band play on if the groove is good and the harmonies are intriguing" rather than adhering to any standard song length.

Kings of Convenience released their fourth album, Peace or Love, in 2021.

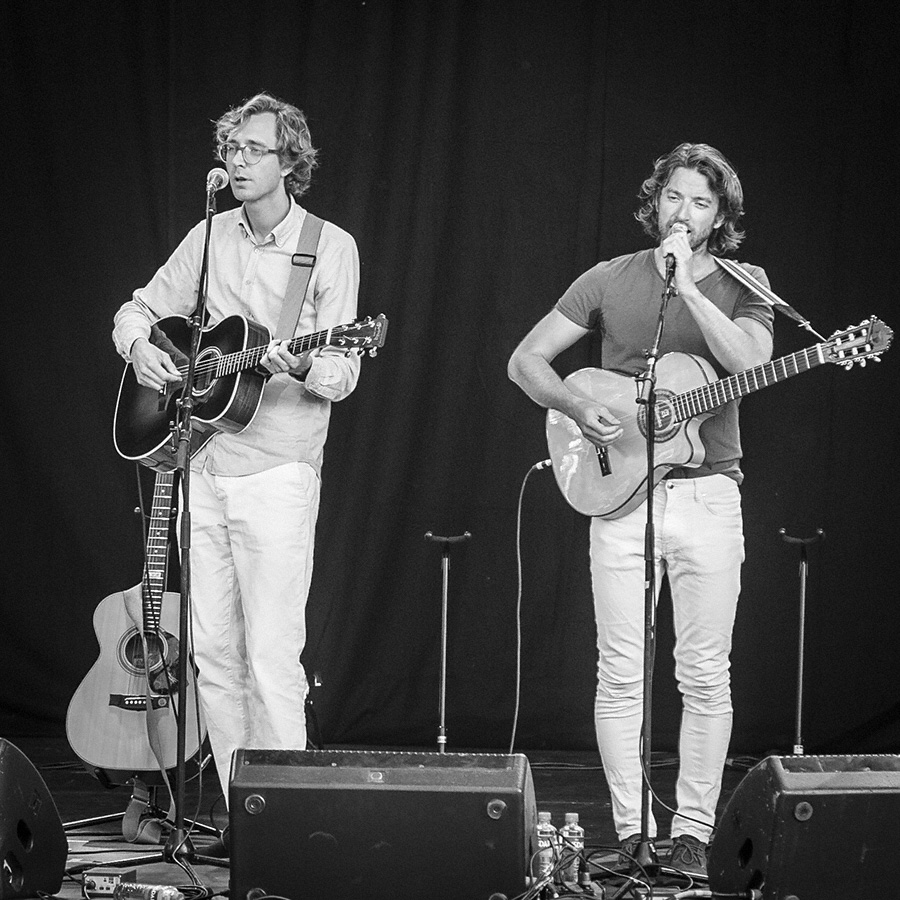
Erlend Øye (on the left) playing with Eirik (right)
