= Unrest (Erlend Øye album) =

Studio album by Erlend Øye
- Released: January 27, 2003
- Recorded: July 2001 – June 2002
- Genre: Electronica, indie pop
- Length: 44:04
- Label: Astralwerks
- Producer: Bjørn Torske; Dirk Dresselhaus; Erlend Øye; Morgan Geist; Mr Velcro Fastener; Schneider TM; Scott Herren; Tatu Metsätähti

Erlend Øye chronology
Unrest (2003)	DJ-Kicks: Erlend Øye (2004)

Professional ratings
Review scores
Source	Rating
Allmusic	4/5 stars
Pitchfork Media	7.9/10
Q	4/5 stars
Visions	11/12

Unrest is the debut solo album from Kings of Convenience and The Whitest Boy Alive singer Erlend Øye, released by the record label Astralwerks in 2003. Each track on the record was recorded in a different city.

== Track listing ==
No.	Title	Producer, Location	Length
1.	"Ghost Trains"	Morgan Geist, New York City	4:19
2.	"Sheltered Life"	Soviet, Shelton, Connecticut	4:20
3.	"Sudden Rush"	Kompis, Uddevalla	3:25
4.	"Prego Amore"	Jolly Music, Rome	3:53
5.	"Every Party Has a Winner and a Loser"	Prefuse 73, Barcelona	4:37
6.	"The Athlete"	Minizza, Rennes	3:41
7.	"Symptom of Disease"	Mr. Velcro Fastener, Turku	4:57
8.	"The Talk"	Bjørn Torske, Bergen	3:09
9.	"A While Ago and Recently"	Kilogram, Helsinki	7:03
10.	"Like Gold"	Schneider TM, Berlin	4:22

== Music video ==
- "Sudden Rush", directed by Jarvis Cocker

== Charts ==
Chart (2003)	Peak position
Norwegian Albums (VG-lista)	3
UK Albums Chart (Official Charts Company)	126
