= DJ-Kicks: Erlend Øye =

Compilation album by Erlend Øye
- Released: 19 April 2004
- Genres: Electronica; indie dance
- Length: 51:56
- Label: Studio !K7
- Producer: Erlend Øye

Erlend Øye chronology
Unrest (2003)	DJ-Kicks: Erlend Øye (2004)	Legao (2014)

DJ-Kicks chronology
Chicken Lips (2003)	Erlend Øye (2004)	Daddy G (2004)

DJ-Kicks: Erlend Øye is a DJ mix album, mixed by Erlend Øye. It was released on 19 April 2004 on the Studio !K7 independent record label as part of the DJ-Kicks series. All vocals on the a cappella tracks are performed by Øye. The release was preceded on April 12 by the single "The Black Keys Work", a remix of which appears on the album. Also released was a promotional 12'' vinyl single for "Sheltered Life/Fine Day".

The album was awarded a silver certification from the Independent Music Companies Association which indicated sales of at least 30,000 copies throughout Europe.

== Reception ==
Professional ratings
Review scores
Source	Rating
AllMusic	3.5/5 stars
The Guardian	4/5 stars
Pitchfork	8.2/10
Resident Advisor	4.0/5
Stylus Magazine	B−

Online music magazine Pitchfork placed Erlend Øye's DJ-Kicks at number 148 on its list of top 200 albums of the 2000s.

== Track listing ==
No.	Title	Featuring	Length
1.	"So Weit Wie Noch Nie"	Jürgen Paape	3:44
2.	"Sheltered Life/Fine Day (A Capella)"		2:04
3.	"Drop (Kings of Convenience Remix)"	Cornelius	3:30
4.	"If I Ever Feel Better"	Phoenix	3:10
5.	"Radio Jolly/Prego Amore (A Capella)"	Jolly Music	2:05
6.	"Rubicon"	Alan Braxe & Fred Falke	3:58
7.	"2D2F"	Avenue D	2:51
8.	"I Need Your Love"	The Rapture	1:55
9.	"Lattialla Taas/Venus (A Capella)" (Shocking Blue cover)	Uusi Fantasia	1:03
10.	"2 After 909/Intergalactic Autobahn (A Capella)"	Justus Köhncke	2:29
11.	"The Black Keys Work (DJ-Kicks)"		3:35
12.	"Airraid"	Jackmate	3:19
13.	"Poor Leno (Silicone Soul's Hypno House Dub)/There Is a Light That Never Goes Out (A Capella)" (The Smiths cover)	Röyksopp	4:54
14.	"Metal Chix/Always on My Mind (A Capella)" (Brenda Lee cover)	Skatebård	3:10
15.	"Dexter"	Ricardo Villalobos	2:59
16.	"Winning A Battle, Losing The War"	Minizza	3:47
17.	"Lullaby/A Place In My Heart (A Capella)"	Morgan Geist	3:23

== Charts ==
Chart performance for DJ-Kicks: Erlend Øye
Chart (2004)	Peak position
Norwegian Albums (VG-lista)	23
