= Hest (album) =

Studio album by Kakkmaddafakka
- Released: 25 February 2011
- Genre: Pop
- Length: 30:33
- Label: Bubbles Records
- Producer: Erlend Øye

Kakkmaddafakka chronology
Down to Earth (2007)	Hest (2011)	Six Months Is a Long Time (2013)

Singles from Hest
- 1. "Restless"; 2. "Your Girl"

Professional ratings
Review scores
Source	Rating
BA	4/6 stars
P3	4/6 stars

Hest is the second studio album by Norwegian indie rock band Kakkmaddafakka. It was released on 25 February 2011.

== Track listing ==
Hest track listing
No.	Title	Length
1.	"Restless"	2:57
2.	"Your Girl"	3:29
3.	"Self-Esteem"	3:48
4.	"Make The First Move"	3:24
5.	"Is She"	3:43
6.	"Touching"	3:05
7.	"Heidelberg"	3:10
8.	"Gangsta"	3:25
9.	"Drø Sø"	3:28

== Personnel ==
=== Kakkmaddafakka ===
- Axel Vindenes - vocals, guitar
- Pål Vindenes - vocals, cello, guitar
- Stian Sævig - bass, backing vocals, vocals
- Kristoffer Van Der Pas - drums, backing vocals
- Jonas Nielsen - piano, vocals
- Lars Helmik Raaheim-Olsen - percussion, backing vocals

=== Technical ===
- Erlend Øye – producer
- Jonas Verwijen – mixing
- Bo Kondren – mastering
