= Franklin for Short =

Franklin for Short is an indie band from Ventura, California that touts a folky-beach sound. Current members include Seth Pettersen, Trevor Beld-Jimenez, Bryan Russell, Brian Granillo, and Matt Barks. They have been supporting acts for artists such as Kings of Convenience, The Mother Hips, and Sherwood. Franklin for Short has released seven albums in their six-year existence and are currently signed to Beehouse Records. Trevor Beld-Jimenez is also the singer and songwriter of Tall Tales and the Silver Lining. Seth Pettersen also has a musical side project known as Seth Pettersen and The Undertow. Franklin for Short has been on hiatus since 2010.

== History ==
Franklin for Short was started by Seth Pettersen and Trevor Beld, who had been playing music together since the 1990s. Pettersen wrote a demo of 12 songs, which featured Beld on bass. The band emerged from the coffee shop scene, eventually forming into a quintet.

== Discography ==
- Wildcat (2002)
- Lovesick Mistress (2004)
- In the Dark (2004)
- The Gift Curse (2005)
- Swell (2008)
- Dark Cloud (2010)

== Members ==
- Seth Pettersen - vocals, guitar
- Trevor Beld-Jimenez - bass, vocals
- Bryan Russell - guitar
- Brian Granillo - drums
- Matt Barks - keys

== Past members ==
- Hot Carl- guitar, noise, sonic youth sounds
- Victor Fuentes (Daisy Fuentes Cousin) Drums, punk rock from the 805
