= KMF (album) =

Studio album by Kakkmaddafakka
- Released: 18 March 2016
- Genre: Pop
- Length: 40:13
- Label: Bergen Mafia Records
- Producer: Axel Vindenes, Pål Vindenes, Robert Jønnum

Kakkmaddafakka chronology
Six Months Is a Long Time (2013)	KMF (2016)	Hus (2017)

Singles from KMF
- 1. "Galapagos"; 2. "Young You"

Professional ratings
Review scores
Source	Rating
BA	4/6 stars
Gaffa	4/6 stars

KMF is the fourth studio album by Norwegian indie rock band Kakkmaddafakka. It was released on 18 March 2016.

== Track listing ==
KMF track listing
No.	Title	Music	Length
1.	"Galapagos"	Axel Vindenes	3:15
2.	"May God"	Pål Vindenes	3:26
3.	"Young You"	Axel Vindenes, Pål Vindenes	3:40
4.	"Change"	Axel Vindenes	3:22
5.	"30 Days"	Axel Vindenes, Pål Vindenes	3:24
6.	"Fool"	Axel Vindenes	4:10
7.	"No Cure"	Axel Vindenes	3:50
8.	"Language"	Pål Vindenes	2:56
9.	"Superwoman"	Axel Vindenes	2:38
10.	"True"	Axel Vindenes	3:11
11.	"Lilac"	Axel Vindenes, Kristoffer van der Pas, Pål Vindenes, Stian Sævig	3:12
12.	"Empty Streets"	Axel Vindenes, Pål Vindenes	3:03

== Personnel ==
=== Kakkmaddafakka ===
- Axel Vindenes - vocals, guitar
- Pål Vindenes - vocals, guitar
- Stian Sævig - bass, backing vocals
- Kristoffer Van Der Pas - drums, backing vocals
- Sebastian Kittelsen - piano
- Lars Helmik Raaheim-Olsen - percussion, backing vocals

=== Technical ===
- Axel Vindenes – producer
- Pål Vindenes – producer
- Robert Jønnum – producer
- Norman Nitzsche – mixing
- Bo Kondren – mastering

=== Artwork ===
- Vera Kleppe – design
- Linn Heidi Stokkedal – photography
