= Peace or Love =

2021 studio album by Kings of Convenience

Studio album by Kings of Convenience
- Released: 18 June 2021
- Length: 37:31
- Label: EMI
- Producers: Kings of Convenience; Antonio Pulli; Cristian Heyne; Davide Bertolini; Kalle Gustafsson Jerneholm; Phil Weinrobe; Robert Jønnum

Kings of Convenience chronology
Declaration of Dependence (2009)	Peace or Love (2021)

Singles from Peace or Love
- 1. "Rocky Trail" Released: 30 April 2021; 2. "Fever" Released: 28 May 2021

Peace or Love is the fourth studio album by Norwegian indie folk-pop duo Kings of Convenience. Released on 18 June 2021, it is their first album in 12 years. It features two song collaborations with Canadian musician Feist. It was preceded by two singles: "Rocky Trail" and "Fever".

== Background and release ==
Kings of Convenience released their third studio album Declaration of Dependence in 2009 which reached number four on the US Billboard 200 chart and was met with generally favourable reviews. In April 2021, the duo, which consists of Erlend Øye and Eirik Glambek Bøe, announced the release of their fourth studio album titled Peace or Love. "Rocky Trail" was released as the lead single on 30 April 2021, alongside the album's announcement. "Fever" was served as the second single on 28 May. The album was released on 18 June by EMI Records. Their first album in 12 years, Peace or Love was recorded by the duo five times.

== Music ==
The melody and arrangement of "Catholic Country" was "jammed out" with The Staves at the first PEOPLE Festival.

== Critical reception ==
Professional ratings
Aggregate scores
Source	Rating
AnyDecentMusic?	7.0/10
Metacritic	76/100
Review scores
Source	Rating
AllMusic	4/5 stars
Exclaim!	7/10
Evening Standard	4/5 stars
The Guardian	4/5 stars
The Independent	3/5 stars
Mojo	3/5 stars
musicOMH	4/5 stars
Paste	7.4/10
Pitchfork	6.7/10
Uncut	9/10

Peace or Love received positive reviews from music critics. At Metacritic, which assigns a weighted average rating out of 100 to reviews from mainstream publications, this release received an average score of 76 based on 10 reviews, indicating "generally favourable reviews". At AnyDecentMusic?, which collates album reviews from websites, magazines and newspapers, they gave the release a 7 out of 10, based on a critical consensus of 13 reviews.

In a 9/10 review, Tom Pinnock of Uncut called it their most cohesive album to date, writing that the band "seem to have discovered the purest essence of the music they create." Reviewing for The Guardian, Ben Beaumont-Thomas praised the duo's vocal chemistry as well as the album's acoustic arrangement and emotional narrative, calling it "a beautifully simple return". Similarly, Eric Mason from Slant Magazine commended the record for retaining the duo's "distinctly tranquil guitar-centric sound" and favoured the presence of bossa nova. Pitchfork writer Linnie Greene described the album as "an especially airbrushed take on easy-listening pop".

== Track listing ==
All tracks are written by Eirik Glambek Bøe and Erlend Øye, except where noted.

No.	Title	Writer(s)	Producer(s)	Length
1.	"Rumours"		Kings of Convenience; Davide Bertolini	4:08
2.	"Rocky Trail"		Kalle Gustafsson Jerneholm	3:30
3.	"Comb My Hair"		Kings of Convenience; Gustafsson Jerneholm	3:15
4.	"Angel"		Kings of Convenience; Cristian Heyne	3:16
5.	"Love Is a Lonely Thing" (featuring Feist)	Eirik Glambek Bøe; Erlend Øye; Leslie Feist; Stefano Ortisi	Kings of Convenience; Antonio Pulli	2:44
6.	"Fever"	Glambek Bøe; Øye; Tobias Hett	Kings of Convenience; Bertolini	3:56
7.	"Killers"		Kings of Convenience; Gustafsson Jerneholm	3:54
8.	"Ask for Help"		Robert Jønnum	4:04
9.	"Catholic Country" (featuring Feist)	Glambek Bøe; Øye; Davide Bertolini; Camilla Staveley-Taylor; Emily Staveley-Taylor; Jessica Staveley-Taylor	Bertolini; Phil Weinrobe	3:01
10.	"Song About It"		Jønnum	3:05
11.	"Washing Machine"		Gustafsson Jerneholm	2:38
Total length:				37:31

== Personnel ==
Credits adapted from the album's liner notes and Tidal.

=== Musicians ===
- Eirik Glambek Bøe – vocals (tracks 1–11), nylon-string acoustic guitar (tracks 1–11), piano (track 6), drums (track 9)
- Erlend Øye – vocals (tracks 1–6, 8–11), steel-string acoustic guitar (tracks 1–11)
- Feist – vocals (tracks 5, 9)
- Davide Bertolini – upright bass (track 1, 9), viola da gamba (track 9)
- Alexander Grieg – bowed upright bass (tracks 1, 6)
- Tobias Hett – viola (tracks 2, 4, 6, 11)
- Alexander von Mehren – bass (track 2), marimba (track 2), keyboards (track 2)

=== Technical ===
- Kings of Convenience – production (tracks 1, 3–7), mixing (tracks 1, 3, 5–7)
- Erlend Øye – programming (track 6), recording (track 6)
- Davide Bertolini – production (tracks 1, 6, 9), mixing (tracks 1, 4, 6, 9), recording (tracks 1, 4, 6, 9), upright bass (track 1)
- Kalle Gustafsson Jerneholm – production (tracks 2, 3, 7, 11), mixing (tracks 2, 3, 7, 11), recording (tracks 2, 3, 7, 11)
- Cristian Heyne – production (track 4), recording (track 4)
- Robert Jønnum – production (tracks 8, 10), mixing (tracks 8, 10), recording (tracks 8, 10)
- Antonio Pulli – production (track 5), mixing (track 5), recording (track 5)
- Phil Weinrobe – production (track 9), recording (track 9)
- Fernando Herrera Bastidas – mixing (track 4), recording (track 4)
- Jørgen Træen – mastering (tracks 1, 2, 4–6, 9–11)
- Norman Nitzsche – mastering (tracks 3, 7, 8)
- Sascha Steinfurth – guitar technician

=== Artwork ===
- Glauco Canalis – front cover photograph, jacket photograph, label photograph
- Salvo Alibrio – gatefold spread photograph, tiny blurry photograph
- Andrea Moschella – graphic design

=== Other ===
- Sascha Steinfurth – consultant
- Øystein Bruvik – album title

== Charts ==
Chart performance for Peace or Love
Chart (2021)	Peak position
Austrian Albums (Ö3 Austria)	18
Belgian Albums (Ultratop Flanders)	10
Belgian Albums (Ultratop Wallonia)	46
Dutch Albums (Album Top 100)	24
French Albums (SNEP)	130
German Albums (Offizielle Top 100)	10
Italian Albums (FIMI)	60
Norwegian Albums (VG-lista)	4
Scottish Albums (Official Charts)	9
Swiss Albums (Schweizer Hitparade)	11
UK Albums (Official Charts)	26
UK Album Downloads (Official Charts)	21
