= Skog =

Norwegian rock band

- Origin: Bergen, Norway
- Genres: indie folk; indie pop; indie rock
- Years active: 1995–1997, 2006–2011
- Past members: Anders Waage Nilsen; Øystein Gjærder Bruvik; Eirik Glambek Bøe; Erlend Øye

Skog (forest in Norwegian, taking inspiration from the famous song "A Forest" by The Cure) was a rock band from Bergen which formed in the early 1990s and folded at the end of the same decade. The group consisted of Anders Waage Nilsen, Øystein Gjærder Bruvik, Eirik Glambek Bøe and Erlend Øye. The latter two later found success as the duo Kings of Convenience. The band released in 1996 the EP Tom Tids Tale, which consisted of four songs, plus a cover song of Joy Division's The Eternal on a compilation. In 2006, Anders Waage Nilsen, Øystein Gjærder Bruvik and Eirik Glambek Bøe got back together to form the band Kommode.

== Members ==
- Erlend Øye (bass and vocals)
- Eirik Glambek Bøe (guitar)
- Øystein Gjærder Bruvik (guitar)
- Anders Waage Nilsen (drums)

== Discography ==
=== EP ===
- 1996 – Tom Tids Tale

=== Compilations ===
- 1997 – VV.AA. – Balance. From The Joy Division Reservoir (Skog – The Eternal)

=== LP ===
- 2017 – Analog Dance Music
