= Hus (album) =

Studio album by Kakkmaddafakka
- Released: 29 September 2017
- Studio: Huset Studio
- Genre: Pop
- Length: 35:10
- Label: Bergen Mafia Records
- Producer: Kakkmaddafakka

Kakkmaddafakka chronology
KMF (2016)	Hus (2017)	Diplomacy (2019)

Singles from Hus
- 1. "All I Want To Hear (ÅÅÅ)"; 2. "Neighbourhood"; 3. "Summer Melancholy"

Professional ratings
Review scores
Source	Rating
BT	3/6 stars

Hus is the fifth studio album by Norwegian indie rock band Kakkmaddafakka. It was released on 29 September 2017.

The Norwegian actor Helge Jordal starred in the music video for the song "Neighbourhood".

== Track listing ==
Hus track listing
No.	Title	Music	Length
1.	"Neighbourhood"	Axel Vindenes, Pål Vindenes, Kristoffer van der Pas	3:22
2.	"Boy"	Axel Vindenes, Pål Vindenes	3:08
3.	"Holding Me Back"	Pål Vindenes	3:49
4.	"Save Yourself"	Pål Vindenes, Kristoffer van der Pas	4:11
5.	"All I Want To Hear (ÅÅÅ)"	Axel Vindenes, Pål Vindenes, Kristoffer van der Pas	3:07
6.	"Don Juan"	Axel Vindenes, Pål Vindenes, Kristoffer van der Pas	3:40
7.	"Summer Melancholy"	Axel Vindenes	3:25
8.	"Blue Eyes"	Pål Vindenes	3:12
9.	"Games"	Axel Vindenes, Pål Vindenes, Kristoffer van der Pas	4:13
10.	"Hillside"	Axel Vindenes, Pål Vindenes, Kristoffer van der Pas	3:00

== Personnel ==
=== Kakkmaddafakka ===
- Axel Vindenes - vocals, guitar
- Pål Vindenes - vocals, guitar
- Stian Sævig - bass, backing vocals
- Kristoffer Van Der Pas - drums, backing vocals
- Sebastian Kittelsen - piano

=== Technical ===
- Kakkmaddafakka – producer
- Anders Bjelland – mixing
- Bo Kondren – mastering

=== Artwork ===
- Richard Sargeant – design
