= Dreams (The Whitest Boy Alive album) =

Studio album by the Whitest Boy Alive
- Released: June 5, 2006
- Genres: Indie pop, dream pop
- Length: 41:34
- Label: Service

The Whitest Boy Alive chronology
Dreams (2006)	Rules (2009)

Professional ratings
Review scores
Source	Rating
BBC	4/5 stars
Drowned in Sound	8/10 stars
The Guardian	4/5 stars
MusicOMH	4/5 stars
NME	6/10 stars
Pitchfork	(7.1/10)
Rockfeedback	3/5 stars

Dreams is the debut album by German-Norwegian indie pop band the Whitest Boy Alive, released on June 5, 2006, in Norway and September 4, 2006, internationally. It was issued by Service Records and Asound/Bubbles. Early pressings of the album, such as the Norway release by the label Smalltown Supersound, carry a different track sequencing to later pressings which have since become the standard for reprints. The band's frontman, Erlend Øye, was performing an electronic arrangement of the track "Don't Give Up" with the duo Röyksopp from as early as 2001.

== Track listing ==
=== First pressing sequencing ===
The Service Records CD (SERV027) lists this track order as:

No.	Title	Length
1.	"Burning"	3:11
2.	"Above You"	3:15
3.	"Inflation"	3:50
4.	"Fireworks"	3:12
5.	"Done With You"	5:24
6.	"Don't Give Up"	5:55
7.	"Figures"	3:57
8.	"Borders"	5:30
9.	"Golden Cage"	4:02
10.	"All Ears"	3:20

=== International release sequencing ===
The Asound/Bubbles CD (ASCD01) lists this track order is:

No.	Title	Length
1.	"Burning"	3:11
2.	"Golden Cage"	4:02
3.	"Fireworks"	3:12
4.	"Done with You"	5:24
5.	"Don't Give Up"	5:55
6.	"Above You"	3:15
7.	"Inflation"	3:50
8.	"Figures"	3:57
9.	"Borders"	5:30
10.	"All Ears"	3:20

== Charts ==
Chart performance for Dreams
Chart (2006)	Peak position
Norwegian Albums (VG-lista)	29
Swedish Albums (Sverigetopplistan)	36
