= Toxic Girl =

Single by Kings of Convenience

from the album Quiet is the New Loud
- Released: 2001
- Genre: Indie rock
- Label: Astralwerks
- Songwriter(s): Eirik Glambek Bøe and Erlend Øye
- Producer(s): Kings of Convenience, Ken Nelson

Alternative cover
- Cover of CD2

"Toxic Girl" is a single by the Norwegian indie rock duo Kings of Convenience. It was released in 2001, and peaked at 44 on the UK singles chart. It was released in three formats in the United Kingdom by Astralwerks.

The song gained some exposure in the United States in 2002 when it was used in a television commercial for AT&T Wireless. The song was also used in the movie Shallow Hal when Hal first sees Rosemary. The song was also considered for the soundtrack to 500 Days of Summer, but was rejected because the song tracked the plot of the movie too well.

An official video was shot in Kings of Convenience's hometown, Bergen (Norway) on 35mm film, and directed by French director François Nemeta. The "Monte Carlo 1963" Version of the song is used in the video, which has extra strings compared to the album version.

== Track listing ==
CD 1

1. "Toxic Girl" (Monte Carlo 1963 Version) - 3:06
2. "Little Kids" (Lively Version) - 2:53
3. "Once Around The Block" (Our Version) - 2:26

CD 2

1. "Toxic Girl" (Album Version) - 3:07
2. "Winning a Battle, Losing the War" (J-Walk Remix) - 5:11
3. "Gold for the Price of Silver" (Acoustic version) - 03:58

7" vinyl

1. "Toxic Girl" (Album Version) - 3:07
2. "Once Around the Block" - 2:26
