= Do I Look Like a Slut? =

Single by Avenue D

from the album Bootleg
- Released: May 17, 2004
- Genre: Electroclash
- Length: 5:25
- Label: Star 69
- Songwriters: Debbie Attias; Daphne Gomez-Mena; Larry Tee; Michael Pedraza
- Producers: Larry Tee; Erik Roos

Avenue D singles chronology
"The Sex That I Need" / "Dancin'" (2003)	"Do I Look Like a Slut?" (2004)	"You Love This Ass" (2005)

"Do I Look Like a Slut?", known as "Slut?" for the album version, is a song by American electroclash duo Avenue D from their second studio album, Bootleg (2004). It reached number eight on the Billboard Hot Dance Singles Sales chart in 2005.

== Reception ==
Michael Hamersly of The Miami Herald called the song a "ranchy anthem". Tom Bowker of The Miami Herald noted that by 2005 the song had become a "club hit". According to The Dallas Morning News by October 2005 the song had reached number 10 on a list of "Local Pop Singles".

== Impact ==
The popularity of the song later motivated Debbie D. to leave the group Avenue D; she commented in a 2009 interview with The Miami Herald, "I was ready to do something new. I was tired of everybody coming up to me and asking me, 'Do I look like a slut?' Irony only goes so far. We turned into the characters in our songs. We wrote them when we were 21. By 28 I had just outgrown it."

== Track listings ==
- UK CD single
1. "Do I Look Like a Slut" (Larry Tee Original) – 5:25
2. "Do I Look Like a Slut" (SupaLaska Retouch) – 5:25
3. "Do I Look Like a Slut" (Smokescreen Remix) – 5:39
4. "Do I Look Like a Slut" (Video)
5. "Bang" (Live at Nag Nag Nag/06.08.03) (Video)
- UK 12" single

A1. "Do I Look Like a Slut" (Larry Tee Original) – 5:25
A2. "Do I Look Like a Slut" (SupaLaska Retouch) – 5:25
B1. "Do I Look Like a Slut" (Smokescreen Remix) – 5:39

- US CD maxi single
1. "Do I Look Like a Slut?" (Original Version) – 4:53
2. "Do I Look Like a Slut?" (Sizequeen Remix) – 7:22
3. "Do I Look Like a Slut?" (DJ Rooster & Sammy Peralta Remix) – 8:34
4. "Do I Look Like a Slut?" (Robbie Rivera Remix) – 7:28
5. "Do I Look Like a Slut?" (Jerel's Action Blacktion Mix) – 7:37
6. "Do I Look Like a Slut?" (James Thinks You're a Slut Mix) – 11:16
7. "Do I Look Like a Slut?" (Peter's Sluts on the Runway Mix) – 7:22
- US 12" single – Remixes by Robbie Rivera / DJ Rooster & Sammy Peralta

A. "Do I Look Like a Slut?" (Robbie Rivera Mix) – 7:28
B. "Do I Look Like a Slut?" (DJ Rooster & Sammy Peralta Remix) – 8:34

- US 12" single – Remixes by Sizequeen & Hector Fonseca

A. "Do I Look Like a Slut?" (Sizequeen Remix) – 7:22
B. "Do I Look Like a Slut?" (Hector Fonseca Remix) – 7:58

- US digital single
1. "Do I Look Like a Slut?" (Original Version) – 4:55
2. "Do I Look Like a Slut?" (Hector Fonseca Wants to Shake It Remix) – 7:58
3. "Do I Look Like a Slut?" (Sizequeen Remix) – 7:23
4. "Do I Look Like a Slut?" (Robbie Rivera Remix) – 7:30
5. "Do I Look Like a Slut?" (Jerel's Action Blacktion Mix) – 7:39
6. "Do I Look Like a Slut?" (DJ Rooster & Sammy Peralta Remix) – 8:36
7. "Do I Look Like a Slut?" (James Thinks You're a Slut Mix) – 11:16
8. "Do I Look Like a Slut?" (Peter's Sluts on the Runway Mix) – 7:22
- US digital single – D-Unity + Seductive 2011 remixes
1. "Do I Look Like a Slut?" (D-Unity Remix) – 7:00
2. "Do I Look Like a Slut?" (Seductive Remix) – 5:37

== Charts ==
Chart (2005)	Peak position
US Hot Dance Singles Sales	8

== Release history ==
Region	Date	Format	Label	Ref.
United Kingdom	May 17, 2004	CD single; 12" single	Electric Blue	
United States	July 26, 2005	CD maxi single; 12" single	Star 69	
United States	August 18, 2005	Digital download	Star 69	
United States	December 20, 2011	Digital download – 2011 remixes	Star 69	
