= Riot on an Empty Street =

Studio album by Kings of Convenience
- Released: 21 June 2004
- Recorded: September 2003–March 2004
- Genres: Indie pop; indie folk
- Length: 44:26
- Label: Astralwerks
- Producers: Kings of Convenience, Davide Bertolini

Kings of Convenience chronology
| Versus (2001) | Riot on an Empty Street (2004) | Declaration of Dependence (2009) |

Singles from Riot on an Empty Street
- 1. "Misread" / "The Build-Up" Released: 14 June 2004; 2. "I'd Rather Dance with You" Released: 23 August 2004; 3. "Know-How" / "Cayman Islands" Released: 21 February 2005

Riot on an Empty Street is the second album from Norwegian duo Kings of Convenience. It features two song collaborations with Canadian musician Feist. It peaked at number 2 in Norway, number 3 in Italy (staying in the chart for a year) and number 49 in the UK Albums Chart.

== Critical reception ==
Professional ratings
Aggregate scores
| Source | Rating |
|---|---|
| Metacritic | 71/100 |
Review scores
| Source | Rating |
| AllMusic | 4/5 stars |
| Entertainment Weekly | B+ |
| The Guardian | 4/5 stars |
| The Independent | 5/5 stars |
| Mojo | 3/5 stars |
| NME | 6/10 |
| Pitchfork | 7.3/10 |
| Q | 3/5 stars |
| Rolling Stone | 3.5/5 stars |
| Uncut | 3/5 stars |

Riot on an Empty Street received largely positive reviews from contemporary music critics. At Metacritic, which assigns a normalized rating out of 100 to reviews from mainstream critics, the album received an average score of 71, based on 18 reviews, which indicates "generally favorable reviews".

== Track listing ==
All tracks are written by Eirik Glambek Bøe and Erlend Øye, except where noted.

| No. | Title | Writer(s) | Length |
|---|---|---|---|
| 1. | "Homesick" | | 3:13 |
| 2. | "Misread" | | 3:08 |
| 3. | "Cayman Islands" | | 3:02 |
| 4. | "Stay Out of Trouble" | | 5:04 |
| 5. | "Know-How" | Eirik Glambek Bøe; Erlend Øye; Feist | 3:58 |
| 6. | "Sorry or Please" | | 3:47 |
| 7. | "Love Is No Big Truth" | | 3:48 |
| 8. | "I'd Rather Dance with You" | | 3:29 |
| 9. | "Live Long" | lyrics: Are Glambek Bøe/Eirik Glambek Bøe/Erlend Øye | 2:57 |
| 10. | "Surprise Ice" | | 4:23 |
| 11. | "Gold in the Air of Summer" | | 3:33 |
| 12. | "The Build-Up" | Eirik Glambek Bøe; Erlend Øye; Feist | 4:05 |
| Total length: | | | 44:26 |

Japanese Edition (VJCP-68629) Bonus Tracks
| No. | Title | Length |
|---|---|---|
| 13. | "Weight of My Words" (Four Tet Remix) | 4:58 |
| 14. | "The Girl from Back Then" (Riton's Uber Jazz Mix) | 3:06 |
| 15. | "Winning a Battle, Losing a War" (Andy Votel Mix) | 4:24 |

== Personnel ==
Kings of Convenience

- Erlend Øye - lead (6, 12), co-lead (1, 3, 4, 7, 8, 11) and harmony (5, 9, 10) vocals, guitar (7, 11, 12), steel string guitar (3, 4, 5, 10), electric guitar (1), bass (8), drums (5, 6, 8, 12), piano (8), banjo (6), trumpet (6), arrangement (4, 6)
- Eirik Glambek Bøe - lead (2, 5, 9, 10), co-lead (1, 3, 4, 7, 8, 11) and harmony (6) vocals, guitar (2, 5, 6, 7, 8, 9), nylon string guitar (1, 3, 4, 10), bass (8), piano (2, 5, 6, 7, 8, 9, 11), drums (7), arpeggios (11), percussion (8), banjo (7), arrangement (4, 6)

Additional personnel

- Feist - lead vocals [outro] (5, 12)
- Davide Bertolini - bass (7), upright bass (2, 4, 5, 6), bowed bass (11), arrangement (4, 6)
- Tobias Hett - viola (2, 4, 6, 8), arrangement (4, 6)
- Gary Peterson - trumpet (6), arrangement (6)
- Siri Hilmen - cello (2, 3), cello [outro] (4), arrangement (3, 4)
- Peter Kates - additional cymbals (8), hi-hat (8)
- John-Arild Suther - trombone (9, 11)
- Petter Alexander Olsen - creative consultant (9)

== Certifications ==
| Region | Certification | Certified units/sales |
|---|---|---|
| United Kingdom (BPI) | Silver | 60,000^{‡} |
| United States | — | 78,000 |
Summaries
| Europe | — | 400,000 |
^{‡} Sales+streaming figures based on certification alone.
