= Diplomacy (album) =

Studio album by Kakkmaddafakka
- Released: 22 March 2019
- Studio: Skogen Studio
- Genre: Pop
- Length: 32:33
- Label: Bergen Mafia Records
- Producer: Matias Tellez

Kakkmaddafakka chronology
Hus (2017)	Diplomacy (2019)	Revelation (2022)

Singles from Diplomacy
- 1. "Naked Blue"; 2. "Runaway Girl"; 3. "The Rest"

Professional ratings
Review scores
Source	Rating
BA	4/6 stars
Gaffa	5/6 stars

Diplomacy is the sixth studio album by Norwegian indie rock band Kakkmaddafakka. It was released on 22 March 2019.

== Track listing ==
Diplomacy track listing
No.	Title	Music	Length
1.	"My Name"	Axel Vindenes	3:44
2.	"Runaway Girl"	Axel Vindenes, Pål Vindenes	3:03
3.	"The Rest"	Axel Vindenes	4:04
4.	"Sin"	Pål Vindenes	2:57
5.	"Get Go"	Axel Vindenes, Pål Vindenes, Kristoffer Van Der Pas	3:45
6.	"Frequency"	Axel Vindenes	3:16
7.	"Moon Man"	Pål Vindenes	3:35
8.	"Naked Blue"	Axel Vindenes	3:54
9.	"This Love"	Axel Vindenes	4:21

== Personnel ==
=== Kakkmaddafakka ===
- Axel Vindenes - vocals, guitar
- Pål Vindenes - vocals, guitar
- Stian Sævig - bass, backing vocals
- Kristoffer Van Der Pas - drums, backing vocals
- Sebastian Kittelsen - piano

=== Technical ===
- Matias Tellez – producer, mixing
- Bo Kondren – mastering

=== Artwork ===
- Vera Kleppe – design
