= Declaration of Dependence =

Studio album by Kings of Convenience
- Released: 20 October 2009
- Recorded: February 2007 – June 2009
- Genres: Indie pop; indie folk
- Length: 45:15
- Labels: Virgin, EMI
- Producers: Davide Bertolini; Robert Jønnum; Kings of Convenience

Kings of Convenience chronology
Riot on an Empty Street (2004)	Declaration of Dependence (2009)	Peace or Love (2021)

Declaration of Dependence is the third album from Norwegian duo Kings of Convenience, their first album in five years. It was released on 20 October 2009. "Mrs Cold" and "Boat Behind" have been released as radio singles in some countries.

The album was pre-released on 21 September for Spotify premium subscribers. It was released in selected countries (such as Poland) on 28 September 2009.

== Critical reception ==
Professional ratings
Aggregate scores
Source	Rating
Metacritic	65/100
Review scores
Source	Rating
AllMusic	3.5/5 stars
BBC Music	(positive)
The Boston Globe	(positive)
Pitchfork.com	7.9/10
Drowned In Sound	6/10

Declaration of Dependence received mostly positive reviews from contemporary music critics. At Metacritic, which assigns a normalized rating out of 100 to reviews from mainstream critics, the album received an average score of 65, based on 18 reviews, which indicates "generally favorable reviews".

== Track listing ==
All tracks are written by Eirik Glambek Bøe and Erlend Øye.

No.	Title	Length
1.	"24-25"	3:38
2.	"Mrs. Cold"	3:06
3.	"Me in You"	3:09
4.	"Boat Behind"	3:41
5.	"Rule My World"	3:32
6.	"My Ship Isn't Pretty"	3:47
7.	"Renegade"	4:16
8.	"Power of Not Knowing"	2:23
9.	"Peacetime Resistance"	2:54
10.	"Freedom and Its Owner"	3:23
11.	"Riot on an Empty Street"	4:07
12.	"Second to Numb"	3:37
13.	"Scars on Land"	3:42
Total length:		45:15

== Personnel ==
Kings of Convenience

- Erlend Øye – lead (2), co-lead (1, 4, 5, 8, 11, 12) and backing (3, 6, 9, 10, 13) vocals, steel (1, 3, 4, 5, 6, 7, 9, 10, 11, 13) and nylon (2, 8, 12) string guitar
- Eirik Glambek Bøe – lead (3, 6, 7, 9, 10, 13), co-lead (1, 4, 5, 8, 11, 12) and backing (2) vocals, nylon (1, 3, 4, 5, 6, 7, 9, 10, 11, 13) and steel (2, 8, 12) string guitar, piano (3)

Additional personnel

- Davide Bertolini – upright bass (2, 4, 6, 9)
- Tobias Hett – viola (2, 4, 9)

== Certifications ==
Region	Certification	Certified units/sales
Denmark (IFPI Danmark)	Gold	10,000^{‡}
Italy (FIMI)	Gold	25,000^{*}
^{*} Sales figures based on certification alone.^{‡} Sales+streaming figures based on certification alone.
