= Quiet Is the New Loud =

Quiet is the New Loud

Studio album by Kings of Convenience
- Released: 29 January 2001
- Genre: Indie pop
- Length: 44:59
- Label: Astralwerks
- Producer: Kings of Convenience, Ken Nelson

Kings of Convenience chronology
Quiet is the New Loud (2001)	Versus (2001)

Singles from Quiet Is the New Loud
- 1. "Winning a Battle, Losing the War" Released: 12 February 2001; 2. "Toxic Girl" Released: 9 April 2001; 3. "Failure" Released: 2 July 2001

Quiet Is the New Loud is the debut album by Norwegian indie pop duo Kings of Convenience, released on 29 January 2001 by Astralwerks.

== Critical reception ==
Professional ratings
Aggregate scores
Source	Rating
Metacritic	71/100
Review scores
Source	Rating
AllMusic	3.5/5 stars
The Boston Phoenix	3/4 stars
The Guardian	3/5 stars
NME	8/10
Pitchfork	5.2/10
Q	4/5 stars

Quiet Is the New Loud received mostly positive reviews from contemporary music critics. At Metacritic, which assigns a normalized rating out of 100 to reviews from mainstream critics, the album received an average score of 71, based on 11 reviews, which indicates "generally favorable reviews". Caroline Hennessy of RTÉ was quoted saying that "If quiet is indeed the new loud then Eirik and Erlend are on to a sure winner. A bittersweet pop album to wrap yourself up in when the world feels like a scary place."

== Track listing ==
All tracks are written by Eirik Glambek Bøe and Erlend Øye, except where noted.

No.	Title	Writer(s)	Length
1.	"Winning a Battle, Losing the War"		3:54
2.	"Toxic Girl"		3:09
3.	"Singing Softly to Me"		3:09
4.	"I Don't Know What I Can Save You From"		4:37
5.	"Failure"		3:33
6.	"The Weight of My Words"		4:07
7.	"The Girl from Back Then"		2:29
8.	"Leaning Against the Wall"		3:18
9.	"Little Kids"		3:46
10.	"Summer on the Westhill"		4:33
11.	"The Passenger"		3:13
12.	"Parallel Lines"	Bøe; Øye; Daisy Simons	5:11
Total length:			44:59

UK 2-CD Version Bonus Tracks (SOURCD019)
No.	Title	Writer(s)	Length
1.	"Manhattan Skyline" (A-ha cover)	Magne Furuholmen; Pål Waaktaar	4:17
2.	"Envoy"		3:10
Total length:			7:27

Japan Edition Bonus Tracks (VJCP-68325)
No.	Title	Writer(s)	Length
7.	"Once Around the Block" (Badly Drawn Boy cover)	Badly Drawn Boy	2:23
8.	"Manhattan Skyline" (A-ha cover)	Magne Furuholmen; Pål Waaktaar	4:17
Total length:			51:45

== Personnel ==
Kings of Convenience

- Erlend Øye – steel string acoustic and electric guitars, harmony (all but 5) and lead (5) vocals, piano, drums, percussion, string arrangements
- Eirik Glambek Bøe – nylon string acoustic and electric guitars, lead (all but 5) and harmony (5) vocals, piano, drums, string arrangements

Additional personnel

- Ian Bracken – cello (4, 5, 8, 10)
- Matt McGeever – cello (1)
- Ben Dumville – trumpet (3)
- Tarjei Strøm – drum fills (5)

== Certifications ==
Region	Certification	Certified units/sales
Norway (IFPI Norway)	Gold	25,000^{*}
United Kingdom (BPI)	Silver	60,000^{*}
Summaries
Worldwide	—	200,000
^{*} Sales figures based on certification alone.
