= Hjálmar =

Icelandic reggae band

Hjálmar is an Icelandic reggae band formed in 2004 in Keflavík.

== Collaborations ==
On 2 June 2012, at the concert Hljómskálinn á Listahátíð Hjálmar performed with Jimi Tenor. When he introduced Tenor, Guðmundur Kristinn Jónsson said that Hjálmar are currently recording an album with him. The album was eventually released in 2013 titled Dub of Doom and was credited to Jimi Tenor og Hjálmar. In 2014, Erlend Øye and Hjálmar released an album titled Legao.

== Members ==
=== Current ===
- Þorsteinn Einarsson - Guitar and vocals
- Sigurður Halldór Guðmundsson - Keyboards and vocals
- Guðmundur Kristinn Jónsson - Guitar
- Valdimar Kolbeinn Sigurjónsson (2007–present) - Bass
- Helgi Svavar Helgason (2007–present) - Percussion

=== Former ===
- Kristinn Snær Agnarsson (2004-2005)
- Micke "PB" Svensson (2005-2007)
- Nils Olof Törnqvist (2005-2007)
- Petter Winnberg (2004-2007)

== Discography ==
=== Albums ===
- 2004: Hljóðlega af stað
- 2005: Hjálmar
- 2007: Ferðasót
- 2009: IV
- 2010: Keflavík Kingston
- 2011: Órar
- 2019: Allt er eitt
- 2020: Yfir hafið

Collaborations

- 2013: Dub of Doom (Jimi Tenor og Hjálmar)
- 2014: Legao (Erlend Øye)

Compilations

- 2014: Skýjaborgin 2004-2014

=== Singles ===
- 2006: "Saga úr sveitinni"
- 2008: "Dom hinner aldrig ikapp" (with Timbuktu)
- 2010: "Blómin í brekkunni"
- 2010: "Gakktu alla leið"
- 2011: "Messenger of Bad News" (with Jimmy Tenor)
- 2011: "Í gegnum móðuna"
- 2011: "Ég teikna stjörnu"
- 2013: "Skýjaborgin"
- 2014: "Lof"
- 2014: "Ferðasót"
- 2014: "Leiðin okkar allra"
- 2014: "Tilvonandi vor"
- 2015: "Undir Fót"
- 2015: "Hlauptu Hratt"
- 2016: "Er Hann Birtist" (with Mr. Silla)
- 2016: "Allt er Eitt"
- 2017: "Græðgin"
- 2017: "Glugginn"
- 2018: "Hættur að anda"
