= Avenue D (band) =

Former American electroclash band

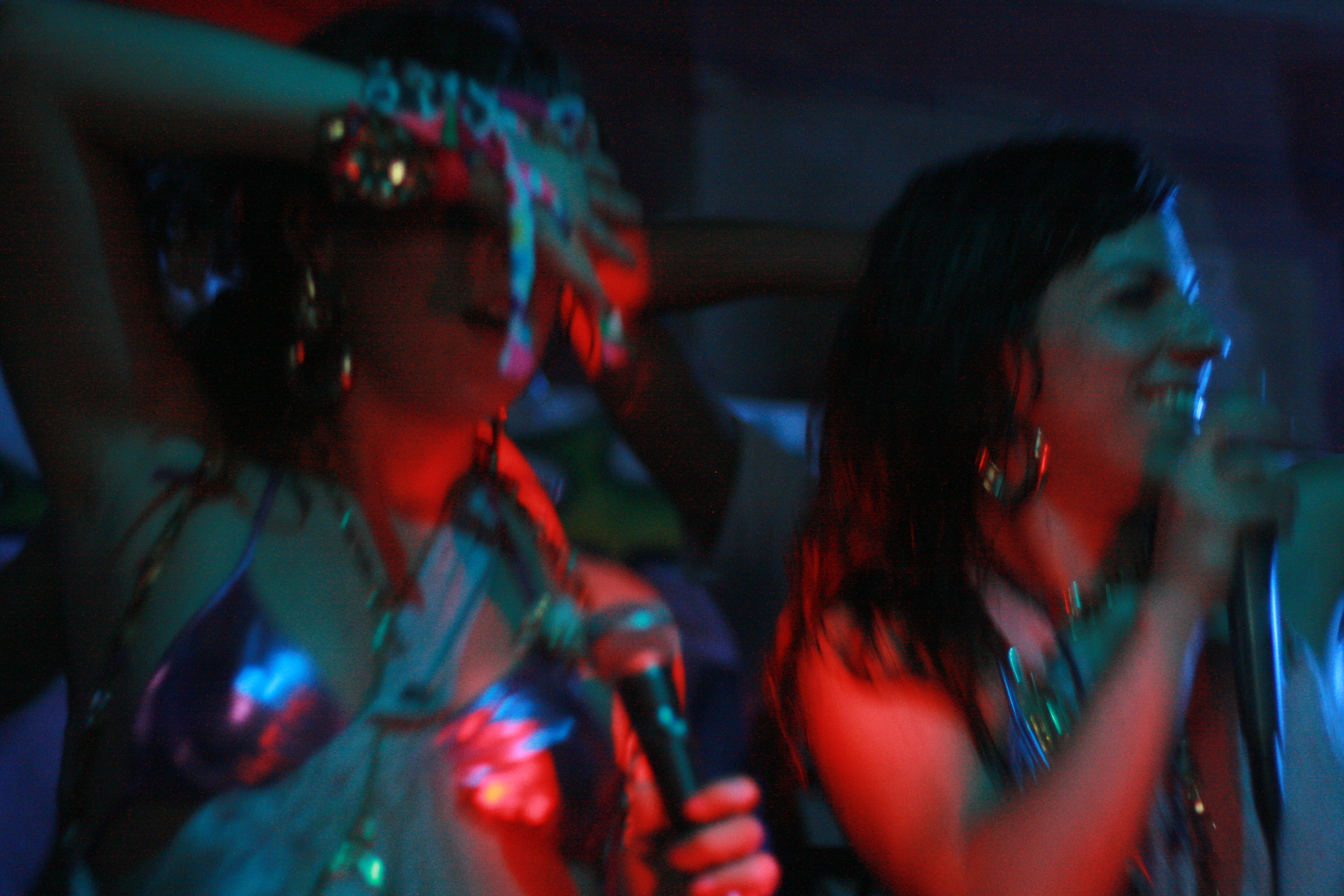
- Avenue D performing at Area 51 in New York City on December 1, 2007

Background information
- Origin: Miami, Florida, US
- Genre: Electroclash
- Years active: 2001–2007
- Label: Avenue Dreams
- Past members: Debbie D. (Debbie Attias); Daphne D. (Daphne Gomez-Mena)
- Website: www.avenued.com

Avenue D was an American electroclash duo from Miami, Florida. Based in New York City, the duo consisted of Debbie D. (Debbie Attias) and Daphne D. (Daphne Gomez-Mena). They were protégés of Larry Tee, and performed for his parties. Their music is an energetic, humorous and sexually explicit mix of hip hop, electro, and new wave.

== History ==
Avenue D formed in 2001, as part of New York's electroclash scene, which also included artists such as Fischerspooner, Peaches, and Felix da Housecat. Their songs were inspired by new wave music and 2 Live Crew. Groups including W.I.T. and My Robot Friend were part of the lineup along with Avenue D in April 2003 at Great American Music Hall in San Francisco, California, and subsequently at the Henry Fonda Theatre on Hollywood Boulevard in Hollywood, California. Boy George appeared onstage with Avenue D at a July 2004 party "Disgraceland" hosted by Larry Tee. They performed at clubs Wave Waikiki and Pussycat Lounge in Honolulu, Hawaii in November 2004. In 2005, they scored a moderate hit with "Do I Look Like a Slut?" on the Billboard Hot Dance Singles Sales chart. The same year, their song "Orgasmatron" was featured prominently in Eon McKai's alt porn film Neu Wave Hookers. The band was also politically active, and played rallies and benefits for causes such as gay marriage.

They released six albums independently, all on their own label, Avenue Dreams. In 2004, they collaborated with Boy George's electroclash project, The Twin, by appearing on his album Yum Yum, on the track "Fire-Desire". A mash-up of the duo's song "Do I Look Like a Slut?" with The Twin's "Here Come the Girls" was also made but remained unreleased until his 2010's compilation, named "Ordinary Alien". Norwegian musician Erlend Øye included Avenue D's song "2D2F" on his installment of the DJ-Kicks compilation series, released on April 19, 2004.

On November 19, 2007, Avenue D announced on their website that they would split up. They performed two final shows in December of that year, one in Brooklyn and the other in Miami. To coincide with Valentine's Day, a triple-disc box set was released in early 2008, containing the albums Grade D Beef (a re-issue of their first album with an altered track presentation), D Sides, and Totally Magic (a collaboration with Phiiliip), packaged in a heart-shaped box with a bonus T-shirt included.

In 2008, Debbie D. joined Otto von Schirach, Jose el Rey, and El Tigre to create the Miami Bass Warriors. The band released a self-titled 12" EP in July 2009. In a 2009 interview with The Miami Herald, Debbie D. reflected on her choice to leave Avenue D, "I was ready to do something new. I was tired of everybody coming up to me and asking me, 'Do I look like a slut?' Irony only goes so far. We turned into the characters in our songs. We wrote them when we were 21. By 28 I had just outgrown it."

== Reception ==
In a review of one of their 2002 concerts in The New York Times, journalist Kelefa Sanneh commented, "The concert also featured no fewer than four white female rappers, all of whom reduced love and lust to a series of anatomical slogans. The most entertaining was Avenue D, a local duo. The two women shouted lyrics that let potential lovers know exactly what they wanted, and they wore barely-there outfits that made it easy for them to turn their demands into dance moves." Agence France-Presse gave a favorable review to a 2003 performance, "From the sharp wit, dirty lyrics and rump shaking of Avenue D and their scantily-panty-clad dancers to the twinkling light suit and homage to machines by My Robot Friend, the range in style, sound and concept was enormous." In trying to describe the duo's style of music, The Honolulu Advertiser observed, "Bad girls: Every music genre has its foul-mouthed instigators. Rap had 2 Live Crew. Alt-rock had L7. Classical had Mozart. And electroclash? It has New York-based Avenue D. Imagine J.J. Fad and Stacey Q mixing up their '80s-era synth beats with profanity-laden tales of anonymous sex, promiscuous peers and, well, more anonymous sex. Daphne D and Debbie D are all that, some fluorescent pink lycra and a roll of duct tape."

In a September 2005 review of the group for The Herald, Rachel Devine wrote, "Debbie D and Daphne D of Avenue D deserve to be queens of the electro scene. Not since Bananarama has a girl group exuded such effortless sexual energy in the pursuit of making music that runs the scale from the ridiculous to the sublime. Michael Hamersly of The Miami Herald characterized songs "Do I Look Like a Slut?" and "The Sex That I Need" as "raunchy anthems". In a later piece for The Miami Herald, journalist Tom Bowker described Avenue D as "the female Latina version of 2 Live Crew". A 2008 review from The Morning Call of Swedish recording artist Robyn's eponymous album compared it to the style of Avenue D., noting, "Robyn's pseudo-thug, occasionally profane lyrics hearken back to the earlier days of electroclash".

== Discography ==
=== Studio albums ===
- Bootleg (2004)
- As Free as We Wanna Be (2006)
- Eurawesome! (2006)
- Totally Magic (2008)
- Grade D Beef (2008, recorded 2002)
- D Sides (2008)

=== Extended plays ===
- 2D2F E.P. (2005, LP, Japan)

=== Box sets ===
- Totally Magic/Grade D Beef/D Sides (2008)

=== Singles ===
- "The Sex That I Need"/"Dancin'" (2003)
- "Do I Look Like a Slut?" (2004)
- "You Love This Ass" (2005)
