= Erlend Øye =

Norwegian musician (born 1975)

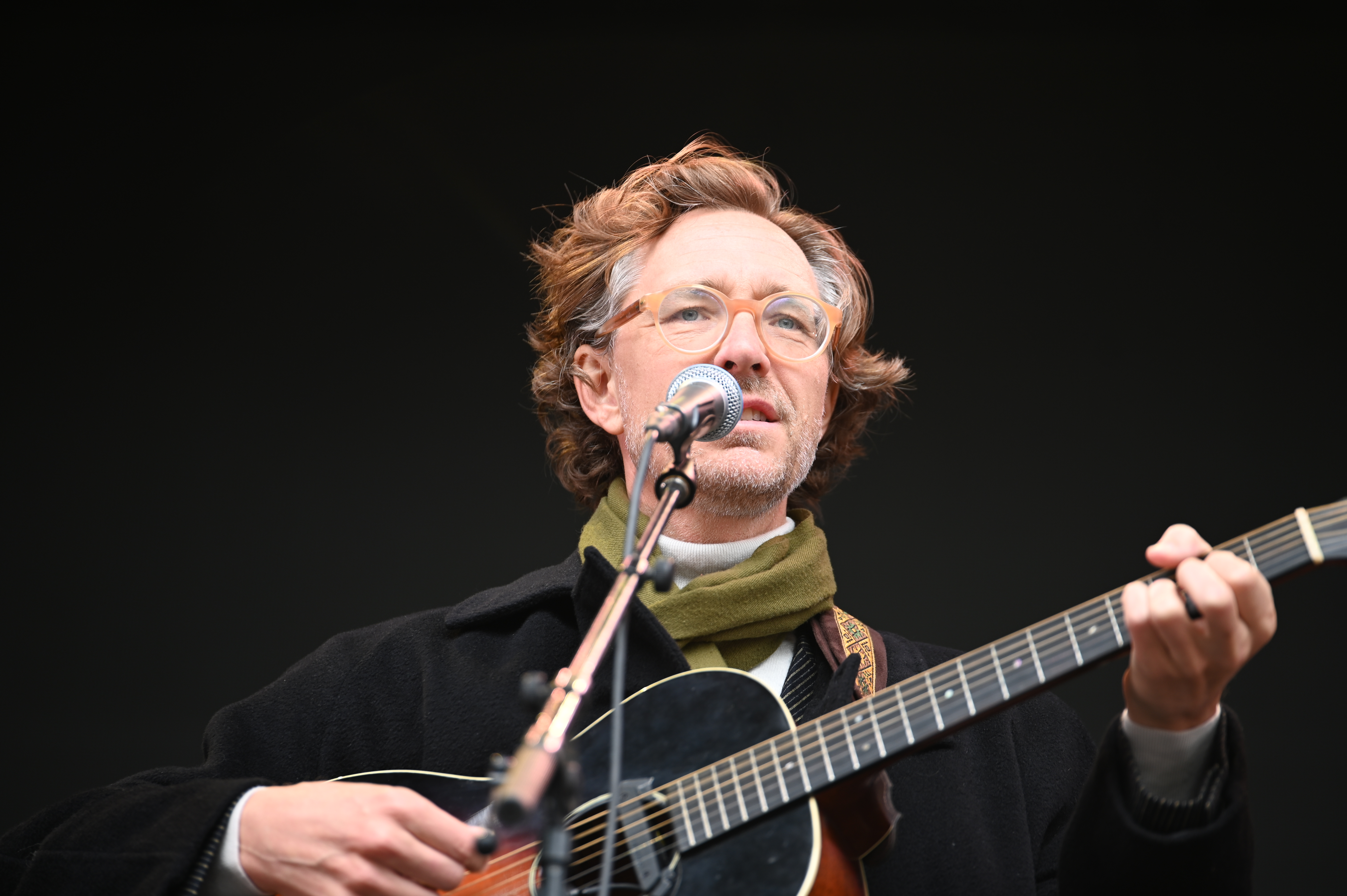
- Øye in 2026

Background information
- Born: Erlend Otre Øye; 21 November 1975 (age 50)
- Origin: Bergen, Norway
- Genres: Alternative dance, electronic, indie folk, indie pop, synthpop
- Occupations: Composer, musician, producer, singer, songwriter
- Instruments: Vocals, guitar, bass guitar, piano
- Years active: 1996–present
- Labels: !K7, Astralwerks, Bubbles Records, EMI, Service, Virgin

Erlend Otre Øye (born 21 November 1975) is a Norwegian composer, musician, producer, singer and songwriter from Bergen, best known for being one half of the indie folk duo Kings of Convenience, along with Eirik Glambek Bøe. Among other musical projects he is front-man for the band The Whitest Boy Alive, and has contributed to tracks by electronic music artists such as Dntel and Norwegian duo Röyksopp. He is also the co-founder of the independent label Bubbles Records. Since 2012 he has lived in Sicily and played extensively with trio La Comitiva.

In addition to his native Norwegian, he also speaks English and some Italian.

== Biography ==
=== Bergen ===
Erlend Øye was born on 21 November 1975 in Bergen, his parents met in 1974 in a demonstration in support of the victims of the 1973 Chilean coup d'état against Salvador Allende that took place in Bergen, at which time his father read a poem, which allowed him to meet Øye's mother. Having grown up listening to Leonard Cohen, Nick Drake, Suzanne Vega and The Smiths, during high school in the early-mid 1990s, he and some of his friends formed the band Skog ("forest" in Norwegian), taking inspiration from the famous song "A Forest" by The Cure. In 1996 he joined the band Peachfuzz as electric guitarist, playing several times in London between 1996 and 1998.

In 1998 he started to collaborate on a project with Mikal Telle of Tellé Records and they created the independent label Opplett with the aim of producing young talent from Bergen and the surrounding area. The label Opplett published three projects: the album Opplett 2008 that contains seven songs by seven artists (such as Lars Vaular, John Olav Nilsen & Gjengen and Razika, 2008); the first single of Indie rock band Razika called Love is All About the Timing; and the first album of the band Fjorden Baby!.

=== London ===
In 1998 he moved to London and then in 1999 to Manchester. When he was back home in Bergen for vacations he jammed with Eirik Glambek Bøe, his former high school and Skog mate. The duo formed Kings of Convenience in 1998 and released the debut record, Quiet is the New Loud, in 2001.

=== Berlin ===
In the same period, he collaborated with the electronic Norwegian duo Röyksopp, lending his voice for the song "Poor Leno" and "Remind Me" on the record Melody A.M.. As a result, he became interested in electronic music and spent the next years in Berlin from 2002 to 2006 or travelling around the world, recording his solo album Unrest in ten cities with ten electronic music artists. He toured as a DJ, singing along with the records that he played and released a remix record for the DJ Kicks series in 2004. In the same year, Kings of Convenience released the second record Riot on an Empty Street. Meanwhile, he founded another project in Berlin, The Whitest Boy Alive. The band originally started as an electronic band, but slowly developed into a band with no electronic elements, releasing the debut record Dreams in 2006, while the latest record entitled Rules was released in 2009. Both the records were released by Bubbles Records, the independent label founded by Erlend Øye and Marcin Öz in 2006. In 2006, he appeared in the Italian movie Shooting Silvio acting as DJ during a house party. In 2009, Kings of Convenience released the third record Declaration of Dependence. In 2011 and 2013, he produced the records Hest and Six months is a long time by fellow Bergen band Kakkmaddafakka.

=== Sicily ===
In 2012, during a small concert organized in a vernissage in Ortigia in Sicily, he publicly stated that he had bought a house in the city of Syracuse to move there with his mother. In 2013, he released a new single, entitled La Prima Estate, sung in Italian and inspired by his time living in Italy, which is accompanied by a videoclip shot in Syracuse. He is currently working on more songs in Italian, which will be made into an album. In 2014, The Whitest Boy Alive announced the end of the project. On 3 October 2014, he released his second solo album Legao, recorded in Reykjavík with Hjálmar, a reggae group from Iceland, which was anticipated by the single Garota with a videoclip shot in Seoul. Despite currently living in Sicily, he is still involved in the Bergen music scene, promoting local bands and assisting the organization of the annual Traena Music Festival.

=== Chile ===
On numerous occasions Øye has visited Chile. His first presentation was in 2006, during his tour in South America. In 2017 he traveled to Chile to spend a season at the home of a close friend who lived in Santiago, where he mainly dedicated himself to composing songs on the ukulele. After playing at the "En Orbita" Festival, he met Tiare Galaz (a member of the Chilean band Niña Tormenta), who also played the ukulele. After talking with Tiare backstage, they agreed to meet another day to share their experiences on the instrument. After being invited to dinner the next day by Tiare, he met Diego Lorenzini, who brought him a chord notebook. Some time later, he was invited to a series of concerts of the Matiné Uva Robot, where he met musicians Rosario Alfonso and Javier Bobbert. In an interview with CNN Chile, he said "from that moment on we started to play regularly while I was in Chile. It was very surprising to see how the musical search of these four Chileans was very similar to what I was doing with the support band that I had formed with three Sicilian friends - called La Comitiva -, so I finally decided to invite them to open my tour of Germany together". Chilean artists were invited to a tour with Øye through Europe, where he established a great friendship with Chilean musicians. During the summer of 2018, he returned to Chile to accompany the Swedish-Argentine singer-songwriter José González, and later accompanied Niña Tormenta, Diego Lorenizini and the band Salanca Selector at an outdoor concert in the Chilean town of Pirque. In 2019 Øye collaborated with Diego Lorenzini in his song Me voy a Valparaíso from his album De algo hay que morir (UVA Robot, 2019). In late 2019, The Whitest Boy Alive announced a new series of performances in Chile and Argentina and in 2020 released the non-album single Serious, the project's first new material since 2009's Rules.

=== Mexico ===
In the beginning of 2020, due to the COVID-19 pandemic, Øye found himself stranded in San Jose del Cabo, Mexico. In a hotel that came equipped with a recording studio, Øye and Sebastian Maschat, the drummer of Whitest Boy Alive, recorded the album Quarantine At El Ganzo.

== Discography ==
=== Albums ===
Year	Album	Artist	Notes
2000	Kings of Convenience	Kings of Convenience	Duo with Eirik Glambek Bøe; limited release (North America only); many tracks reappear on Quiet Is the New Loud
2001	Quiet Is the New Loud	Kings of Convenience	
2001	Versus	Kings of Convenience	Compilation of remixes, collaborations, and alternate versions
2003	Unrest	Erlend Øye	
2004	DJ-KiCKS: Erlend Øye	Erlend Øye	Compilation in the style of a DJ mix; for the series by !K7 Records
2004	Riot on an Empty Street	Kings Of Convenience	
2006	Dreams	The Whitest Boy Alive	Four-piece band, with Marcin Öz, Sebastian Maschat, and Daniel Nentwig
2009	Rules	The Whitest Boy Alive	
2009	Declaration of Dependence	Kings of Convenience	
2014	Legao	Erlend Øye	Recorded in collaboration with the Icelandic band Hjálmar
2020	Quarantine at El Ganzo	Sebastian Maschat and Erlend Øye	Recorded at a hotel in Mexico during the COVID-19 pandemic
2021	Peace or Love	Kings of Convenience	
2024	La Comitiva	Erlend Øye & La Comitiva	

=== Singles ===
Year	Song	Artist	Album	Notes
1999	"Brave New World"	Kings of Convenience	Kings of Convenience	
1999	"Failure"	Kings of Convenience	Kings of Convenience	
1999	"Toxic Girl"	Kings of Convenience	Kings of Convenience	
2001	"Winning a Battle, Losing the War"	Kings of Convenience	Quiet Is the New Loud	
2001	"Toxic Girl" (alternate version)	Kings of Convenience	Quiet Is the New Loud	Re-issue; different tracklisting and artwork
2001	"Failure" (alternate version)	Kings of Convenience	Quiet Is the New Loud	Re-issue; different tracklisting and artwork
2002	"Ghost Trains"	Erlend Øye	Unrest	
2002	"Symptom of Disease"	Erlend Øye	Unrest	
2003	"Sudden Rush"	Erlend Øye	Unrest	Music video directed by Jarvis Cocker
2003	"Sheltered Life"	Erlend Øye	Unrest	
2004	"The Black Keys Work"	Erlend Øye	DJ-KiCKS: Erlend Øye	
2004	"Misread"	Kings of Convenience	Riot on an Empty Street	
2004	"Inflation" / "Dance with Me"	The Whitest Boy Alive / Cosmo Vitelli	Kitsuné Midnight	Split 10" vinyl single promoting a compilation album by the label Kitsuné Musique; early version of Inflation
2004	"I'd Rather Dance with You"	Kings of Convenience	Riot on an Empty Street	
2004	"Know-How"	Kings of Convenience	Riot on an Empty Street	Featuring Feist
2006	"Burning" / "Inflation"	The Whitest Boy Alive	Dreams	Double A-side single; album version of 'Inflation'; 'Inflation' music video directed by Marcin Öz
2007	"Burning"	The Whitest Boy Alive	Dreams	
2008	"Golden Cage"	The Whitest Boy Alive	Dreams	Music video directed by Mauro Vecchi
2009	"1517"	The Whitest Boy Alive	Rules	
2009	"Mrs. Cold"	Kings of Convenience	Declaration of Dependence	
2009	"Boat Behind"	Kings of Convenience	Declaration of Dependence	
2013	"La Prima Estate"	Erlend Øye	Non-album single	Music video directed by Gabriele Galanti and Marcin Öz
2014	"Garota"	Erlend Øye	Legao	Music video directed by Mike Beech (as 'Michael Beech') ft. Lee Ha-na
2014	"Fence Me In"	Erlend Øye	Legao	Live studio session video filmed by Magnus Atli Magnusson
2014	"Rainman"	Erlend Øye	Legao	Music video directed by Clara Cebrian
2015	"Estate"	Erlend Øye	Onde Nostre: Guarda Dove Ti Ho Portato	Originally by Bruno Martino; from the soundtrack for the documentary 'Peninsula', directed by Luca Merli
2019	"Paradiso"	Erlend Øye and La Comitiva	Non-album singles	Featuring Stargaze; music video directed by Mike Beech
2019	"For the Time Being"	Erlend Øye and La Comitiva	Non-album singles	Originally by Phonique
2020	"Valdivia"	Erlend Øye and La Comitiva	Non-album singles	Featuring Stargaze; music video directed by Abril Shaw
2020	"Serious"	The Whitest Boy Alive	Non-album singles	

=== EPs ===
Year	EP	Artist	Notes
1996	Tom Tids Tale	Skog	Four-piece band, with Anders Waage Nilsen, Øystein Gjærder Bruvik, and Eirik Glambek Bøe
2000	Playing Live in a Room	Kings of Convenience	Limited release (France only); live session
2001	Magic in the Air	Kings of Convenience	
2010	Kings of Convenience's Live Acoustic Sessions – Milan 2009	Kings of Convenience	Live session
2023	Winter Companion	Erlend Øye	Recorded in Mexico City January 2023

=== Collaborations and Guest appearances ===
Year	Song	Artist	Release	Notes
1997	"The Eternal"	Skog	Balance. From the Joy Division Reservoir	Compilation album; originally by Joy Division
2001	"Talco Uno"	Jollymusic	Jolly Bar	Featured vocalist, lyrics credit; music video directed by Scott Lyon
2001	"Poor Leno"	Röyksopp	Melody A.M.	Featured vocalist, lyrics credit
2001	"Remind Me"	Röyksopp	Melody A.M.	Featured vocalist, lyrics credit
2002	"No Train to Stockholm"	Erlend Øye	Total Lee! The Songs of Lee Hazlewood	Compilation album; originally by Lee Hazlewood
2002	"(This Is) The Dream of Evan and Chan (Safety Scissors Spilled My Drink Mix)"	Dntel	(This Is) The Dream of Evan and Chan (EP, 12")	Featured vocalist, lyrics credit
2002	"I Shall Not Die"	Ash	Envy (Single, CD2)	Guitar
2002	"Last Christmas"	Erlend Øye	Seasonal Greetings	Compilation album; originally by Wham!
2003	"Keep On Waiting"	DJ Hell	NY Muscle	Featured vocalist
2003	"The Partner"	Ragazzi	Friday	Choir vocals; music video directed by Jeff Benefit
2004	"A Place in My Heart"	Star You Star Me	Simple Things	Featured vocalist, lyrics credit
2004	"For the Time Being"	Phonique	Identification	Featured vocalist; music video directed by Casper W. Rasmussen
2005	"Lessons in Love"	Kaos	Hello Stranger	Featured vocalist, lyrics credit
2005	"Criticize"	Marco Passarani	Sullen Look	Featured vocalist; credited as Orlando Occhio
2005	"I've Been Waiting So Long"	Korsakow	Ears	Featured vocalist and lyrics credit; credited as Orlando Occhio
2005	"Friends and Lovers"	Erlend Øye	Friends And Lovers: Songs of Bread	Compilation album; originally by Bread
2005	"Cool My Fire"	Ada	Blondix 2 (Single, 12")	Featured vocalist, guitar
2005	"Sunlight's on the Other Side (Long Distance Love Affair)"	Safety Scissors	Sunlight's on the Other Side (Single, 7")	Featured vocalist, guitar
2005	"Breastbone" (alternate version)	Safety Scissors	Sunlight's on the Other Side (Single, 7")	Featured vocalist, guitar
2005	"Sunlight's on the Other Side"	Safety Scissors	Tainted Lunch	Featured vocalist, lyrics credit
2006	"S'kcorratiug"	Schneider TM	Škoda Mluvit	Guitar
2006	"All the Way to China"	James Figurine	Mistake Mistake Mistake	Featured vocalist
2006	"All Ears"	Kompis	Non-album single	Featured vocalist, lyrics credit; uses elements of the song from Dreams
2007	"Casualties"	Phonique	Good Idea	Featured vocalist, lyrics credit
2011	"Crush"	Palmy	5	Featured vocalist
2014	"Flashed"	Dena	Flash	Guitar, producer; music video directed by Chardchakaj Waikawee
2019	"Me Voy A Valparaíso"	Diego Lorenzini	De Algo Hay Que Morir	Co-vocalist
2022	"Poesía Conspirativa"	Diego Lorenzini	Palabritas y Palabrotas	Featured vocalist
2025	"Make It Work"	Papooz	Make It Work	

==== Other work ====
- 2004 – Bart Davenport – Live at the Chabot House (A&R, artwork, recording)
- 2006 – Berardo Carboni – Shooting Silvio (film) (Cameo role as DJ)
- 2008 – Various Artists – Opplett 2008 (Producer)
- 2011 – Kakkmaddafakka – Hest (Producer)
- 2013 – Kakkmaddafakka – Six months is a long time (Producer)
- 2013 – Kakkmaddafakka – Someone New (Music video co-directed with Marcin Öz)

==== Covers ====
Erlend Øye often performs significantly reworked versions of other bands' songs during his concerts, which is reflected in the vocal interludes on his mixtape album DJ-KiCKS: Erlend Øye. Among his most-played covers are:

- Thirteen by Big Star
- Blowin' in the Wind and Don't Think Twice, It's All Right by Bob Dylan
- Redemption Song by Bob Marley
- E la chiamano estate by Bruno Martino
- Brothers in Arms by Dire Straits
- Dreams by Fleetwood Mac
- Sapore di sale by Gino Paoli
- Til þín by Hjálmar
- Una ragazza in due by I Giganti
- These Days by Jackson Browne
- Tram No. 7 to Heaven by Jens Lekman
- Happy Xmas and Jealous Guy by John Lennon
- No Train to Stockholm by Lee Hazlewood
- E la luna bussò by Loredana Bertè
- Grande grande grande by Mina
- Wonderwall by Oasis
- You Can Call Me Al by Paul Simon
- Se a vida é by Pet Shop Boys
- Wish You Were Here by Pink Floyd
- Ignition by R. Kelly
- (They Long to Be) Close to You by Richard Chamberlain
- Norwegian Wood by The Beatles
- Ask, Heaven Knows I'm Miserable Now
- Please, Please, Please, Let Me Get What I Want and There Is a Light That Never Goes Out by The Smiths
- Boys Don't Cry by The Cure
- Last Christmas by Wham!

=== Bands ===
- 1995–1997 – Skog
- 1996–1998 – Peachfuzz
- 1999–present – Kings of Convenience
- 2003–present – solo work
- 2003–2014 / 2019-present – The Whitest Boy Alive
- 201?–present – work with La Comitiva
