= Versus (Kings of Convenience album) =

Remix album by Kings of Convenience
- Released: 30 October 2001
- Genre: Electronica; Indie pop
- Length: 49:12
- Label: Astralwerks
- Producer: Four Tet

Kings of Convenience chronology
Quiet Is the New Loud (2001)	Versus (2001)	Riot on an Empty Street (2004)

Professional ratings
Review scores
Source	Rating
AllMusic	4/5 stars
Drowned in Sound	8/10 stars
NME	7/10 stars
Pitchfork	6.3/10

Versus is an album of remakes, remixes, and collaborations of Kings of Convenience. It was released 30 October 2001 on Astralwerks. It contains songs mostly from the album Quiet is the New Loud.

== Track listing ==
1. "I Don't Know What I Can Save You From" (remix by Röyksopp) – 4:13
2. "The Weight of My Words" (remix by Four Tet) – 4:43
3. "The Girl from Back Then" (remix by Riton) – 3:28
4. "Gold for the Price of Silver" (collaboration with Erot) – 3:04
5. "Winning a Battle, Losing the War" (remix by Andy Votel) – 4:23
6. "Leaning Against the Wall" (remake by Evil Tordivel) – 3:35
7. "Toxic Girl" (string arrangement by David Whitaker) – 3:06
8. "Failure" (remake by Alfie) – 4:19
9. "Little Kids" (remix by Ladytron) – 3:08
10. "Failure" (arrangement by Kings of Convenience) – 4:56
11. "Leaning Against the Wall" (remix by Bamboo Soul) – 3:38
12. "The Weight of My Words" (instrumental remix by Four Tet) – 5:30
