= Ungdomskulen =

Norwegian alternative rock band

- Origin: Bergen, Norway
- Genres: New wave, indie rock, alternative rock
- Members: Kristian Stockhaus; Frode Kvinge Flatland; Øyvind Solheim
- Website: www.ungdomskulen.com

Ungdomskulen is a band from Bergen, Norway.

Their debut album Cry Baby from 2007 received a 7.7. review in Pitchfork. In Norway, Adresseavisen gave a dice throw of 5 (out of 6). The group reminded of The Minutemen, Fugazi and The Jesus Lizard with "a foot firmly planted in prog". Bergensavisen stated that the album contained psychedelia, hippie rock, jazz, punk, grunge, disco and funk. "Here and there, it boils over and just becomes spill and mess. Kristian Stockhaus' voice, manic at times, can also become tiresome". Bergensavisen issued a dice throw of 4, as did Bergens Tidende, VG and Dagbladet. Several reviewers also drew comparisons to Motorpsycho and Frank Zappa. Dagbladet also commented the cover art: "The cover is either the best or worst of the year, crammed with enthusiastically carried out, but cruddy ideas".

Cry Baby also received a dice throw of 5 in Rogalands Avis, 3 in Tønsbergs Blad as well as several additional moderate-to-positive reviews.

== Band members ==
- Kristian Stockhaus – guitar, vocal
- Frode Kvinge Flatland – bass/baritone guitar
- Øyvind Solheim – percussion

== Discography ==
- Gold Rush (2018)
- Secrecy (2012)
- Gimme Ten (EP, 2011)
- Bisexual (2009)
- Cry Baby (2007)
- Ordinary Son (7" picture disc) (2007)
- OH LIFE! / ORDINARY SON (7") (2007)
- Foursome And Then Some (7") (2004)
- What It Takes (7") (2004)
- Surf's Up (7") (2004)
