= Rules (The Whitest Boy Alive album) =

Studio album by the Whitest Boy Alive
- Released: March 30, 2009
- Genres: Indie pop, dream pop
- Length: 44:08
- Label: Bubbles
- Producer: The Whitest Boy Alive

The Whitest Boy Alive chronology
Dreams (2006)	Rules (2009)	Quarantine at El Ganzo (2020)

Professional ratings
Review scores
Source	Rating
AllMusic	link
BBC	Favourable link
Clash	Very favourable link
Contactmusic.com	Favourable link
Gigwise.com	link
The Guardian	link
MusicOMH	link
NME	link
Pitchforkmedia	6.3/10 link
PopMatters	link

Rules is the second and final album by indie pop band the Whitest Boy Alive. It was recorded in Punta Burros Nayarit, Mexico, where the band was staying to rest after a long tour. In early 2009, Australian radio station Triple J named Rules their feature album of the week. The track "1517" was featured in FIFA 10, the video game by EA Sports. This would be the last material the members of the band would record together until the 2020 release of the non-album single "Serious".

== Track listing ==
=== CD sequencing ===
No.	Title	Length
1.	"Keep a Secret"	4:08
2.	"Intentions"	3:39
3.	"Courage"	4:23
4.	"Timebomb"	3:44
5.	"Rollercoaster Ride"	2:40
6.	"High on the Heels"	3:20
7.	"1517"	3:41
8.	"Gravity"	3:49
9.	"Promise Less or Do More"	4:18
10.	"Dead End"	3:23
11.	"Island"	7:04

=== Vinyl sequencing ===
The vinyl release of Rules sports a different track order to the CD release:

No.	Title	Length
1.	"Courage"	4:23
2.	"Gravity"	3:49
3.	"Promise Less or Do More"	4:18
4.	"Island"	7:04
5.	"Rollercoaster Ride"	2:40
6.	"Dead End"	3:23
7.	"Keep a Secret"	4:08
8.	"High on the Heels"	3:20
9.	"Intentions"	3:39
10.	"Timebomb"	3:44
11.	"1517"	3:41

== Personnel ==
- Erlend Øye – guitar, vocals
- Daniel Nentwig – Fender Rhodes piano, Crumar synthesizer
- Marcin Öz – bass; response vocal on "Gravity"
- Sebastian Maschat – drums
- D. Todorova – response vocal on "Gravity"
- S. Rubi – response vocal on "Gravity"

== Charts ==
Chart performance for Rules
Chart (2009)	Peak position
Australian Albums (ARIA)	75
Belgian Albums (Ultratop Flanders)	45
Danish Albums (Hitlisten)	39
Dutch Albums (Album Top 100)	69
French Albums (SNEP)	171
German Albums (Offizielle Top 100)	31
Norwegian Albums (VG-lista)	18
Swiss Albums (Schweizer Hitparade)	50
