= Playing Live in a Room =

EP by Kings of Convenience
- Released: 10 October 2000
- Genre: Indie pop
- Label: Virgin

Playing Live in a Room is an exclusive French release EP from Norwegian duo Kings of Convenience, issued between their first and second albums.

== Track listing ==
1. "Toxic Girl"
2. "Singing Softly to Me"
3. "Into the Ring of Fire"
4. "Parr-A-Pluie"
5. "Until You Understand"
