= Razika =

Norwegian alternative indie pop band

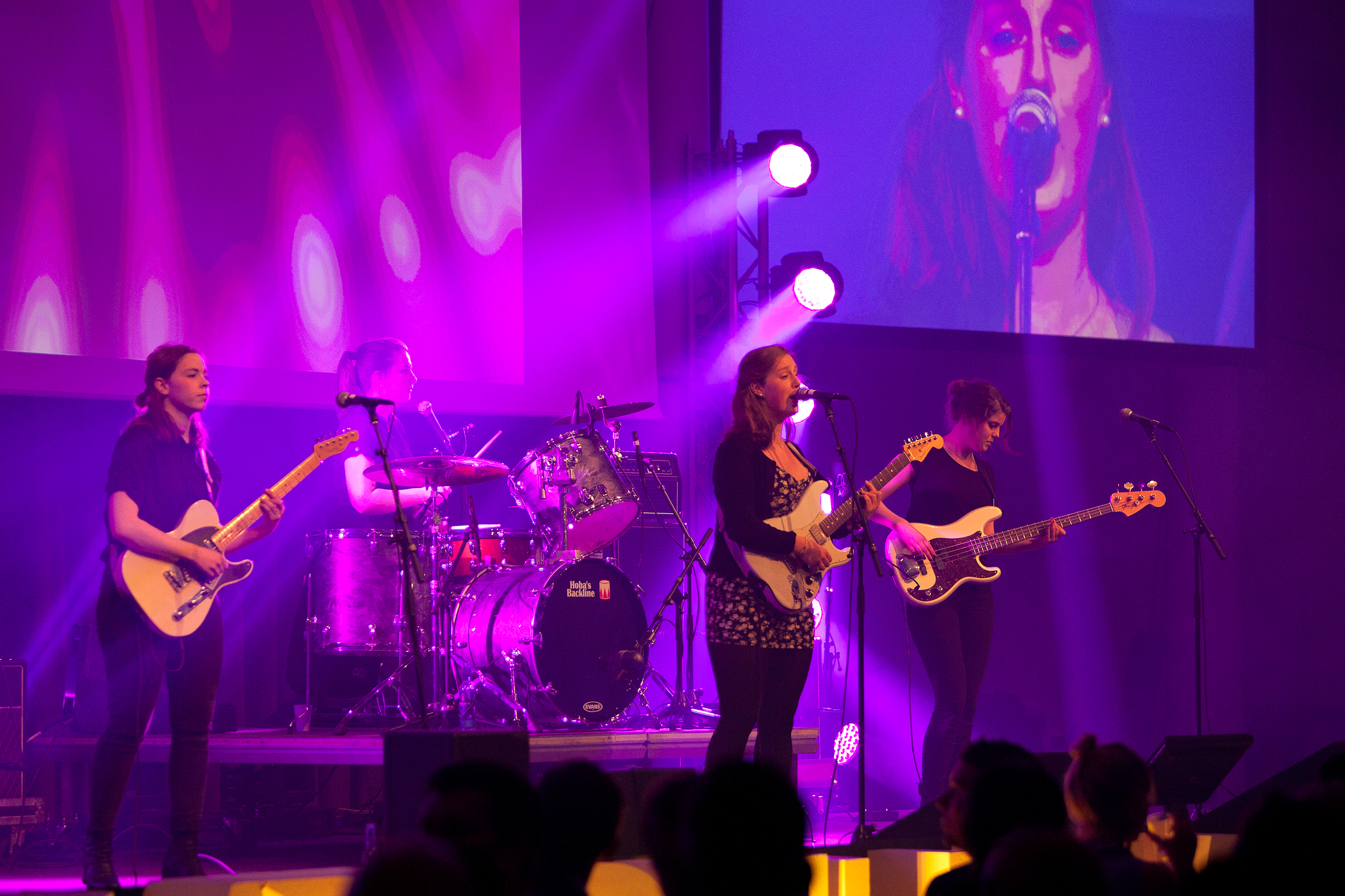
- Razika performing in Gulltaggen (2012)

Background information
- Origin: Bergen, Norway
- Genres: Indie rock, Pop
- Years active: 2006-2019
- Labels: Smalltown Supersound
- Members: Marie Amdam; Maria Råkil; Marie Moe; Embla Karidotter Dahleng
- Website: razika.no

Razika was a Norwegian alternative indie pop band from Møhlenpris, Bergen with various indie rock, punk, ska and reggae influences. While their early work featured some tracks in English, they primarily composed songs in their native Norwegian. In 2010, they were signed to the Smalltown Supersound label and have released four albums: Program 91 (in 2011), På vei hjem (in 2013), Ut til de andre (in 2015) and Sånn Kjennes Verden Ut (in 2018). Exhibiting more of a synth pop style, their fourth studio album represented a stylistic departure from their previous work. Razika split up in 2019 after the summer festival season.

== Members ==
Razika is made up of:

- Marie Amdam - lead singer, vocals, guitar, keyboards
- Maria Råkil - el. guitar, vocals and lead guitar
- Marie Moe - el. bass and vocals
- Embla Karidotter - drums and vocals
Razika, members

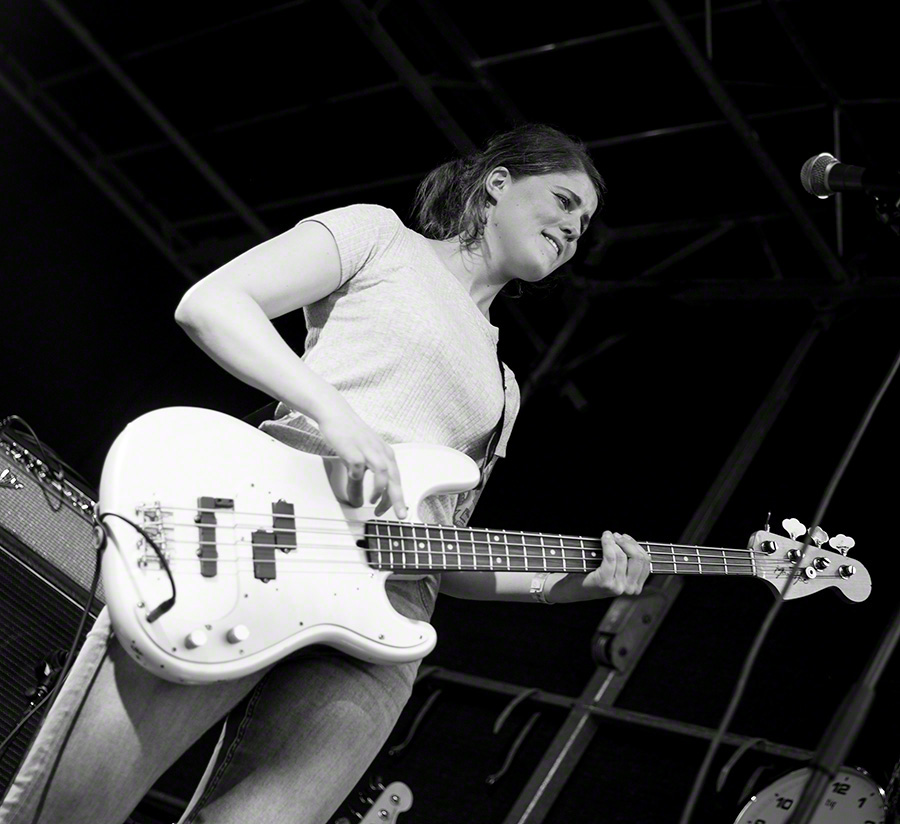
Marie Moe (bass)

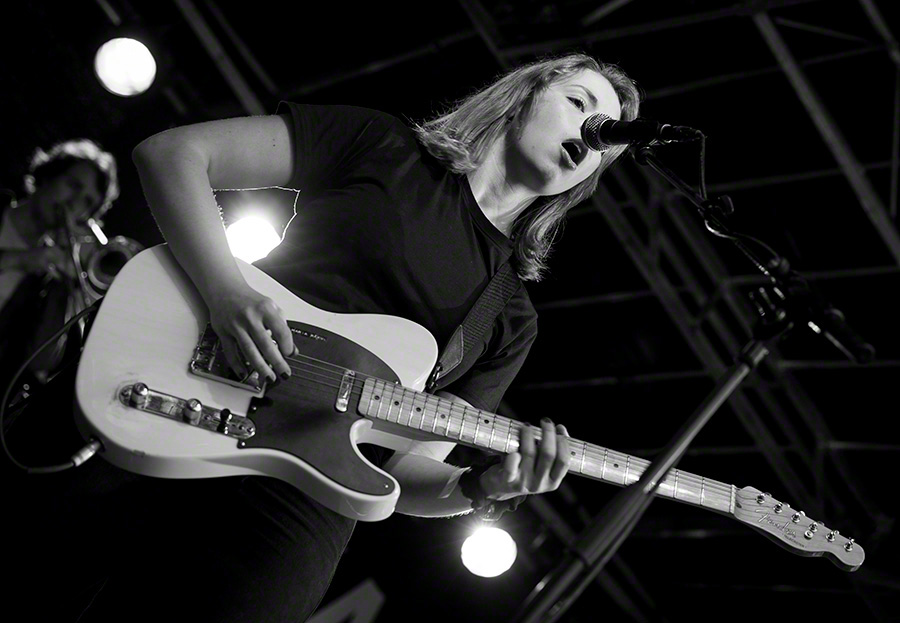
Maria Råkil (vocals and guitar)

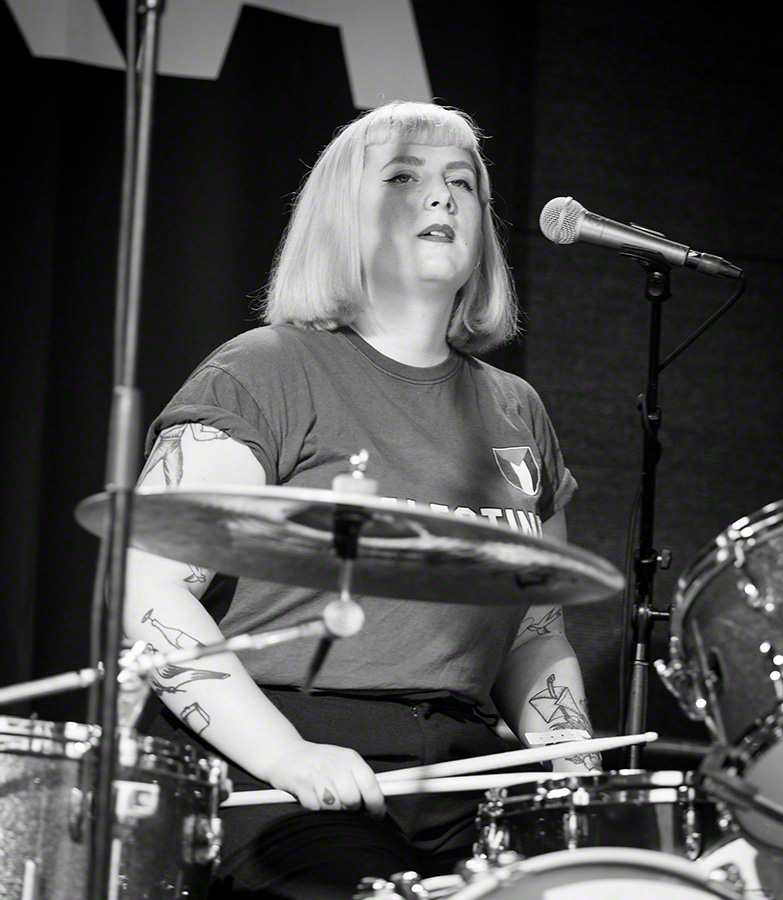
Embla Karidotter (drums)

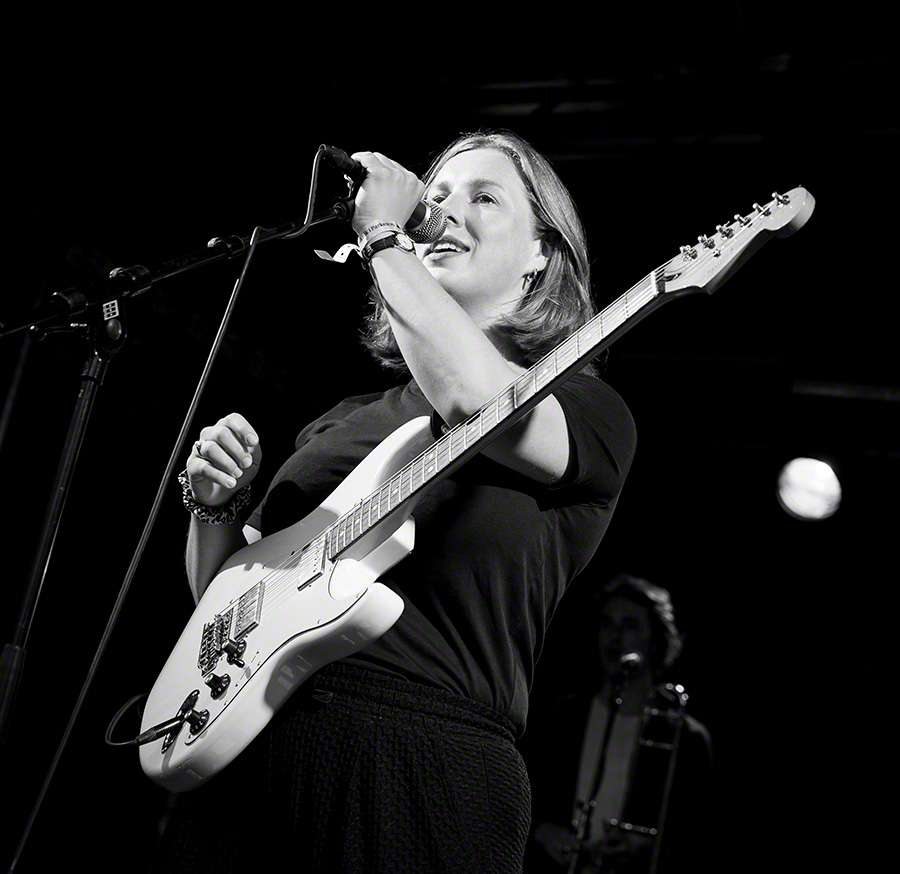
Marie Amdam (vocals and guitar)

== Discography ==
=== Albums ===
- 2011: Program 91 (Smalltown Supersound)
- 2013: På vei hjem
- 2015: Ut til de andre
- 2018: Sånn Kjennes Verden Ut (Jansen Records)

=== Singles ===
- 2008: Love is All About the Timing
- 2011: Vondt i hjertet
- 2014: Syndere i Sommersol
- 2014: Faen Ta Deg
- 2015: Gi Meg, Gi Meg, Gi Meg
- 2016: Se deg ikke tilbake (Opplett)
- 2018: En sjanse til (Jansen Records)
- 2018: D Esje Meg (Jansen Records)
- 2018: Flyplassen (Jansen Records)

=== EPs ===
- 2008: Love is All About the Timing

=== Other appearances ===
- 2013: Ingen slipper unna politikken, (cover song released on the album "Real Ones & The Extended Family" by the band Real Ones)
- 2016: We are the world, on the Album Baertur by Baertur
