= The Whitest Boy Alive =

German-Norwegian musical group

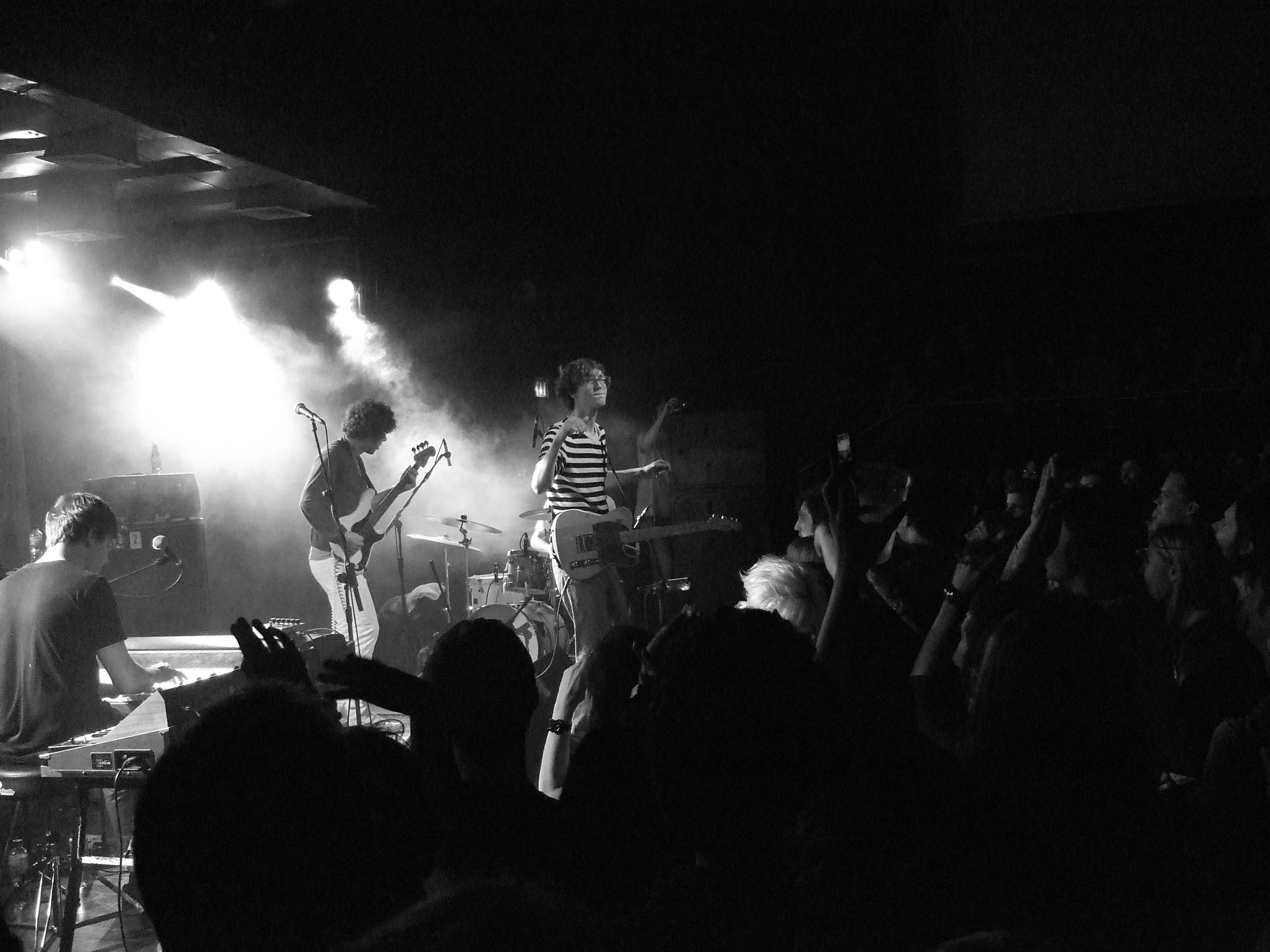
- The Whitest Boy Alive live in London in 2009

Background information
- Origin: Berlin, Germany
- Genres: Indie pop, electronic
- Years active: 2003–2014, 2017, 2019–2026
- Labels: Bubbles, Service
- Members: Erlend Øye; Marcin Öz; Sebastian Maschat; Daniel Nentwig
- Website: http://www.whitestboyalive.com/

The Whitest Boy Alive is a German-Norwegian musical group based in Berlin. It was originally active from 2003 to 2014; after a five-year hiatus, the group reformed in 2019. The band is composed of singer and guitarist Erlend Øye of Kings of Convenience, bassist Marcin Öz, drummer Sebastian Maschat, and Daniel Nentwig on Rhodes piano and Crumar.

== History ==
The Whitest Boy Alive started as an electronic dance music project in 2003 in Berlin, but since slowly developed into a band with no programmed elements. The name of the band comes from the idea of a naïve, shy northern European boy that their music is about. The band's German record label was Bubbles. Their debut album Dreams was released on 21 June 2006 in Germany. In July 2007, Modular Records signed them to their UK imprint and the band played their first UK performance with New Young Pony Club at the London Astoria in September 2007. The album was released in the UK with the single "Burning" in November 2007. The band released their second album Rules in March 2009. It was recorded in a newly built studio located on Punta Burros, Nayarit, Mexico. Their single "1517" was also featured in the soundtrack of the video-game FIFA 10.

The band started The Whitest Boy Alive + The New Wine tour in April 2009, visiting Germany, Denmark, United Kingdom, Switzerland, France, Netherlands, Belgium, and Sweden. In 2011, the band travelled to China with promoters Split Works.

In June 2014, the band announced via their Facebook page that they were "no longer composing or playing together as The Whitest Boy Alive".

On 4 August 2017, Erlend Øye announced via Facebook that The Whitest Boy Alive would perform a 45-minute one-off reunion show on 20 August 2017 in Siracusa, Italy, to celebrate the birthdays of Marcin Öz and Daniel Nentwig. Further, on 3 September 2019, the band announced via their Facebook page that they would play Fauna festival in Chile on 9 November of the same year and expressed an interest in booking further shows, with the conditions they play shorter sets and less frequently than before, due to frontman Erlend Øye's tinnitus.

On 5 March 2020, after more than a decade without releasing any new material, the band released a new single, "Serious", which was recorded and mixed in Buenos Aires, Argentina. A further session to record another new song was planned in spring 2020, but was aborted when the COVID-19 pandemic led to the members becoming physically separated while in Mexico for a festival that later was cancelled. Confined to the state of Baja California Sur, members Sebastian Maschat and Erlend Øye used the hotel recording studio that had been intended to be booked for The Whitest Boy Alive to record solo material (as a duo) which was released as the album Quarantine At El Ganzo in July 2020.

== Band members ==
- Erlend Øye – guitar and vocals
- Marcin Öz – bass
- Sebastian Maschat – drums
- Daniel Nentwig – Rhodes piano and Crumar synthesizer

== Discography ==
=== Albums ===
- Dreams (2006)
- Rules (2009)
- Quarantine at El Ganzo (2020)

=== Singles ===
- "Inflation" (2004)
- "Burning" (2006)
- "Burning" (UK version) (2007) UK Sales No. 78
- "1517" (2009)
- "Serious" (2020)
