= Kings of Convenience =

Norwegian folk duo

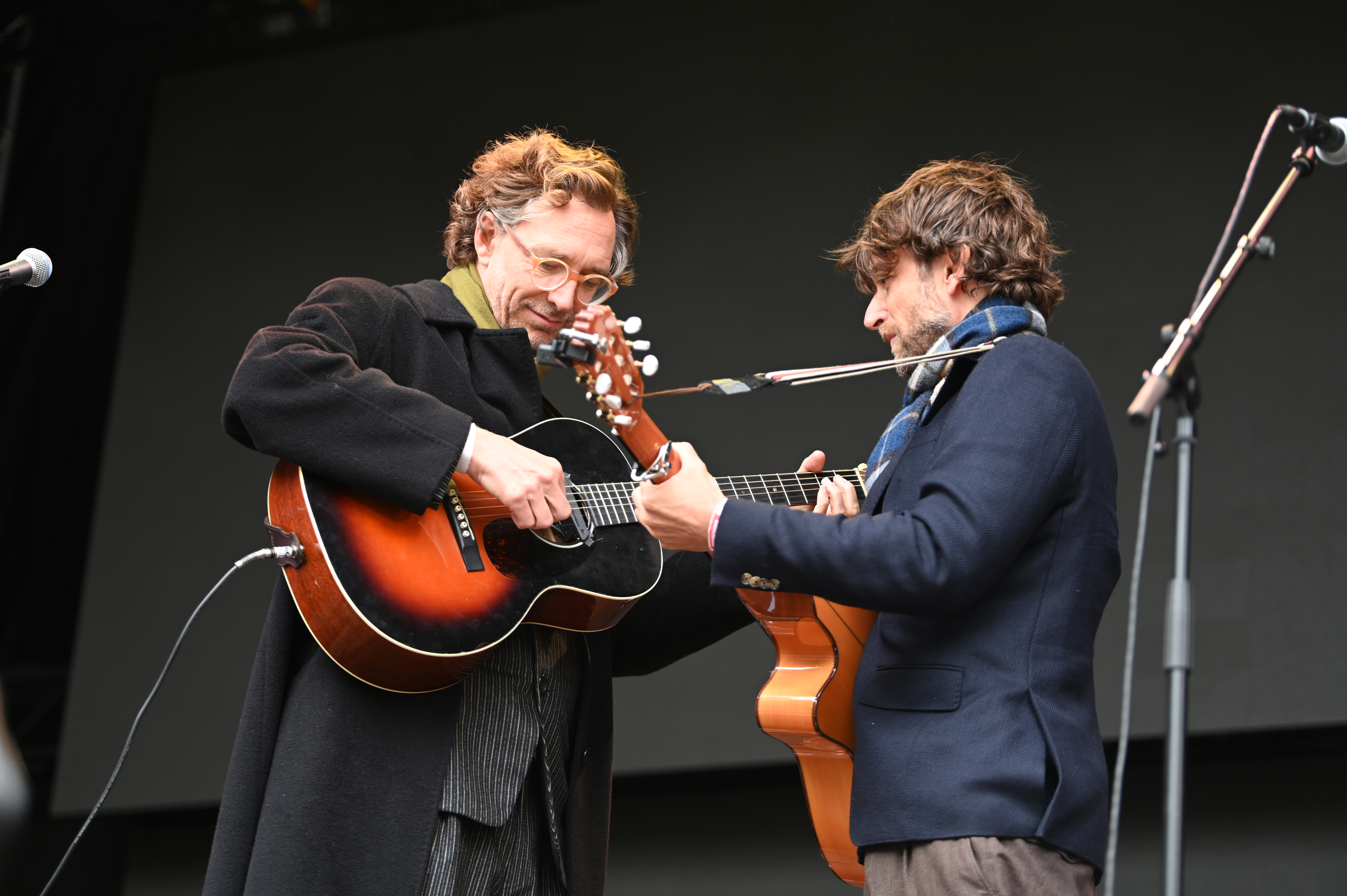
- Kings of Convenience performing in 2026

Background information
- Origin: Bergen, Norway
- Genres: Indie folk
- Years active: 1999–2018, 2021–present
- Labels: EMI, Astralwerks, Kindercore
- Spinoffs: The Whitest Boy Alive, Kommode
- Spinoff of: Skog
- Members: Erlend Øye; Eirik Glambek Bøe
- Website: kingsofconvenience.eu

Kings of Convenience is an indie folk duo from Bergen, Norway, consisting of Erlend Øye and Eirik Glambek Bøe.

== History ==
Øye and Bøe were both born in 1975 (Øye on 21 November and Bøe on 25 October) and have known each other since they met in the same class at school. Their first musical collaboration was a comedic rap about a teacher. At sixteen, they played together in the band Skog ("forest") with two other friends, releasing one EP, Tom Tids Tale, before breaking up and later forming the Kings duo.

The duo was signed to the American label Kindercore after appearing in European festivals during the summer of 1999. After a spell living in London in 2001, they released their debut album Quiet Is the New Loud. The album was produced by Coldplay producer Ken Nelson. The album was very successful and even lent its name to a small movement of musicians in the pop underground (including acoustic contemporaries such as Turin Brakes) which took Elliott Smith, Belle & Sebastian and Simon & Garfunkel as their inspiration and focused on more subtle melodies and messages. Kings of Convenience also inspired an indian music duo Parekh & Singh.

Versus, an album of remixes of tracks from Quiet Is the New Loud, came out shortly after. After this breakthrough year, not much was heard from the band. Øye spent the next few years living in Berlin and doing solo material, releasing music under the DJ Kicks series as well as a solo album titled Unrest. He also had a side project named The Whitest Boy Alive.

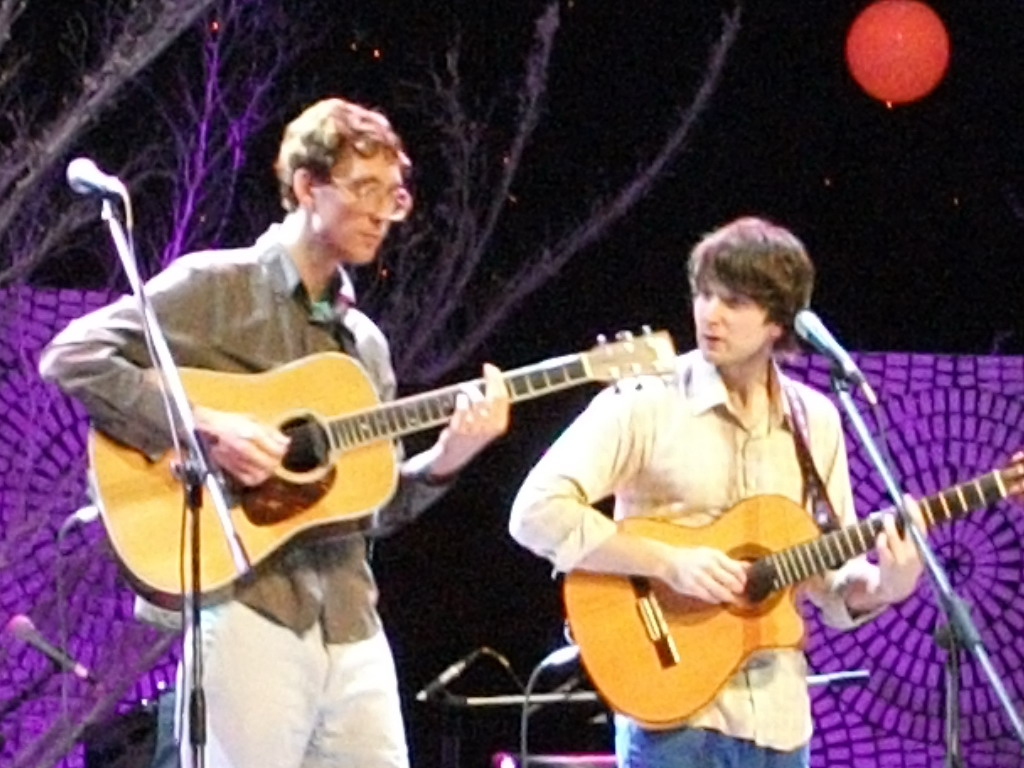
Kings of Convenience performing in Bangkok in 2010

It was not until 2004 that the Kings' follow-up Riot on an Empty Street was released. The video made for "I'd Rather Dance With You", the second single from the album, topped MTV's European list as the best music video of 2004. The album also featured contributions by Feist.

In January 2008 the band played concerts in the Northern Norwegian cities of Tromsø, Svolvær and Bodø, and Swedish city Umeå along with a concert in August in Stockholm. The band then toured North America, Latin America and Europe, including stops in Boston, New York, Toronto, Detroit; Latin American stops in Mexico, Colombia, Argentina, Peru, Brazil and Chile, where they performed in Santiago with local musician Javiera Mena, who later opened for them in Spain and Portugal. European stops include Italy, Switzerland and Spain. On some of their American tour stops they appeared with the band Franklin for Short who joined them on stage for a few rousing numbers.

Their third album, called Declaration of Dependence, was released on 20 October 2009.

In June 2012, the band performed at the Primavera Sound festivals in both Barcelona and Porto.

In 2017, Eirik released an album entitled 'Analog Dance Music' with his other band Kommode.

In March 2019, Kings of Convenience provided an update regarding their upcoming (fourth) album, stating that "the songs were written and even performed live, but when we tried to record it during 2016/2017 for a mixture of reasons the results just weren’t good enough[, and] by that time I (Erlend) didn’t have anymore energy to pour into it[, ... so] 2018 was a charging battery year, and now we are planning to try again".

On 30 April 2021, Kings of Convenience released a new song, "Rocky Trail", after 12 years without publishing music as the duo. They also announced, through their official social network channels, that their fourth studio album, Peace or Love, was released on 18 June 2021 via EMI.

== Discography ==
=== Albums ===
==== Studio albums ====
List of studio albums, with selected chart positions and certifications
Title	Album details	Peak chart positions										Certifications
Title	Album details	NOR	FRA	GER	ITA	NLD	POR	SCO	SWE	UK	US	Certifications
Quiet Is the New Loud	Released: 6 March 2001; Label: Astralwerks; Formats: CD, LP, digital download, streaming	1	103	—	—	—	—	95	—	72	—	IFPI NOR: Gold; BPI: Silver
Riot on an Empty Street	Released: 21 June 2004; Label: Astralwerks; Formats: CD, LP, digital download, streaming	2	80	61	3	91	18	50	53	49	—	BPI: Silver
Declaration of Dependence	Released: 20 October 2009; Label: EMI, Virgin; Formats: CD, LP, digital download, streaming	8	71	32	10	57	22	77	53	69	112	FIMI: Gold
Peace or Love	Released: 18 June 2021; Label: EMI; Formats: CD, LP, MC, digital download, streaming	4	130	10	60	24	7	9	—	26	—	
"—" denotes a recording that did not chart or was not released in that territory.

==== Remix albums ====
List of remix albums, with selected chart positions
Title	Album details	Peak chart positions		
Title	Album details	NOR	UK	UK Indie
Versus	Released: 30 October 2001; Label: Astralwerks; Formats: CD, LP, digital download, streaming	30	135	23

=== EPs ===
List of EPs, with selected chart positions
Title	EP details	Peak chart positions		Track listing
Title	EP details	NOR	UK	Track listing
Playing Live in a Room	Released: 10 October 2000; Label: Virgin; Format: CD, LP	2	—	Track list: 1. Toxic Girl"; 2. "Singing Softly To Me"; 3. "Into The Ring Of Fire"; 4. "Parr-A-Pluie"; 5. "Until You Understand"
Magic in the Air	Released: January 2001; Label: BMG, Sony; Format: CD; Limited release for Magic! RPM magazine	—	82	Track list: 1. "Winning A Battle, Losing The War"; 2. "Manhattan Skyline"; 3. "Riot On An Empty Street"
Live Acoustic Sessions - Milan 2009	Released: 1 January 2010; Label: Virgin; Format: digital download, streaming	—	—	Track list: 1. "24-25 (Live Acoustic Session)"; 2. "Winning a Battle, Losing the War (Live Acoustic Session)"; 3. "Boat Behind (Live Acoustic Session)"; 4. "Love Is No Big Truth (Live Acoustic Session)"
"—" denotes a recording that did not chart or was not released in that territory.

=== Singles ===
List of singles, with selected chart positions, showing year released and album name
Title	Year	Peak chart positions							Album
Title	Year	NOR Air	BEL (FL)	ITA	POL	SCO	UK	UK Indie	Album
"Brave New World"	1999	—	—	—	—	—	—	—	Non-album single
"Failure"	2000	—	—	—	—	87	63	12	Quiet Is the New Loud
"Toxic Girl"	2000	—	—	—	—	48	44	5	Quiet Is the New Loud
"Winning a Battle, Losing the War"	2001	—	—	—	—	98	78	13	Quiet Is the New Loud
"Misread"	2004	—	—	15	—	—	83	—	Riot on an Empty Street
"I'd Rather Dance with You"	2004	—	—	—	—	65	60	—	Riot on an Empty Street
"Know How" (feat. Feist)	2005	—	—	—	—	—	86	—	Riot on an Empty Street
"Mrs. Cold"	2009	—	—	—	41	—	—	—	Declaration of Dependence
"Boat Behind"	2009	—	—	—	37	—	—	—	Declaration of Dependence
"Rocky Trail"	2021	—	— (Note: "Rocky Trail" did not enter the Flanders Ultratop Top 50, but charted as an "extra tip" on the Flanders Ultratop Bubbling Under chart.)	—	—	—	—	—	Peace or Love
"Fever"	2021	8	—	—	—	—	—	—	Peace or Love
"—" denotes a recording that did not chart or was not released in that territory.

==== Music videos ====
- 1999 – Failure
- 1999 – Toxic Girl
- 2004 – Misread
- 2004 – I'd Rather Dance with You
- 2004 – Cayman Islands
- 2009 – Mrs. Cold
- 2009 – Boat Behind
- 2009 – Me in You
- 2021 – Rocky Trail

=== Collaborations ===
- Cornelius – "Drop (The Tusen Takk Rework)" (2002) and "Omstart" (2006)
- Feist – "Know-How" and "The Build Up" (Riot on an Empty Street), "Cayman Islands" from the "Know-How" single (2004) and in "Catholic Country" and "Love is a Lonely Thing" (Peace or Love)
