= Arabesque discography =

- Studio albums: 10
- Live albums: 1
- Compilation albums: 17
- Singles: 34
- Video albums: 1
- Box sets: 2

This is the discography of German Eurodisco trio Arabesque. Included is the discography of Rouge, the duo formed by Michaela Rose and Jasmin Vetter after the departure of Sandra.

== Albums ==
=== Studio albums ===
Title	Album details	Peak chart positions	Sales
Title	Album details	JPN	Sales
Friday Night	Released: November 1978; Label: EMI Electrola, Victor; Formats: LP, MC; Also released as Arabesque	26	JPN: 108,000
City Cats	Released: 25 October 1979; Label: EMI Electrola, Victor; Formats: LP, MC; Also released as Arabesque II	13	JPN: 200,000
Marigot Bay	Released: 21 May 1980; Label: Metronome, Victor; Formats: LP, MC; Also released as Arabesque III	9	JPN: 160,000
Midnight Dancer	Released: 5 December 1980; Label: Victor; Formats: LP, MC; Also released as Arabesque IV	13	JPN: 205,000
In for a Penny	Released: 21 August 1981; Label: Metronome, Victor; Formats: LP, MC; Also released as Arabesque V and Billy's Barbeque	2	JPN: 357,000
Caballero	Released: 21 April 1982; Label: Victor; Formats: LP, MC; Also released as Arabesque VI	9	JPN: 166,010
Why No Reply	Released: 5 December 1982; Label: Victor; Formats: LP, MC; Also released as Arabesque VII	30	JPN: 56,474
Loser Pays the Piper	Released: 5 December 1983; Label: Victor; Formats: LP, MC; Also released as Arabesque VIII	75	JPN: 13,500
Time to Say "Good Bye"	Released: 16 December 1984; Label: Victor; Formats: CD, LP, MC; Also released as Arabesque IX	—	
The Up Graded Collection	Released: 26 October 2018; Label: Monopol; Formats: digital download; Contains re-recordings not, apart from Michaela Rose, by the original line-up	—	
"—" denotes releases that did not chart or were not released in that territory.

=== Live albums ===
Title	Album details	Peak chart positions	Sales
Title	Album details	JPN	Sales
Fancy Concert	Released: 21 October 1982; Label: Victor; Formats: LP, MC	25	JPN: 35,890

=== Compilation albums ===
Title	Album details	Peak chart positions	Sales
Title	Album details	JPN	Sales
Golden Prize	Released: 21 June 1980; Label: Victor; Formats: MC	31	JPN: 44,820
Best One	Released: 21 November 1980; Label: Victor; Formats: MC	41	JPN: 49,460
Greatest Hits	Released: 21 May 1981; Label: Victor; Formats: LP, MC	2	JPN: 686,000
Best One '82	Released: 21 November 1981; Label: Victor; Formats: MC	48	JPN: 30,020
Everybody Likes Arabesque (Hit Medley)	Released: 5 March 1982; Label: Victor; Formats: LP, MC	7	JPN: 109,730
Best Hits	Released: 5 July 1982; Label: Victor; Formats: MC	40	JPN: 30,830
Radio Arabesque	Released: 5 September 1983; Label: Victor; Formats: LP	54	JPN: 10,360
Best Collection	Released: 21 May 1984; Label: Victor; Formats: CD, LP, MC; Also released as Super Best	—	
Best One	Released: 1 November 1987; Label: Victor; Formats: CD	—	
Arabesque	Released: 25 October 1991; Label: Victor; Formats: CD, MC	—	
Deluxe	Released: 28 June 1995; Label: Victor; Formats: 2xCD	—	
The Best Of Vol. 1	Released: 1 April 2004; Label: Monopol; Formats: 2xCD	—	
The Best Of Vol. 2	Released: September 2004; Label: Monopol; Formats: 2xCD	—	
The Best Of Vol. 3	Released: September 2005; Label: Monopol; Formats: 2xCD	—	
The Best Of Vol. 4 – The Mega-Mixes	Released: 18 April 2008; Label: Monopol; Formats: 2xCD	—	
Complete Single Collection	Released: 25 August 2010; Label: Victor; Formats: 2xCD	—	
40th Anniversary Best	Released: 21 June 2017; Label: Victor; Formats: CD	—	
"—" denotes releases that did not chart or were not released in that territory.

=== Box sets ===
Title	Album details
The Best of Arabesque	Released: 24 January 1996; Label: Victor; Formats: 5xCD
Complete Box	Released: 4 February 2015; Label: Victor; Formats: 10xCD+DVD

=== Video albums ===
Title	Album details
Greatest Hits	Released: 1983; Label: Victor; Formats: VHD

== Singles ==
Title	Year	Peak chart positions			Sales	Album
Title	Year	GER	AUT	JPN	Sales	Album
"Hello Mr. Monkey"	1977	—	—	8	JPN: 388,000	Friday Night
"Buggy Boy" (Mexico-only release)	1978	—	—	—		Friday Night
"Friday Night"	1978	—	—	20	JPN: 175,000	Friday Night
"Fly High Little Butterfly" (Japan-only release)	1979	—	—	33	JPN: 66,000	Friday Night
"Rock Me After Midnight" (Japan-only release)	1979	—	—	37	JPN: 80,000	City Cats
"City Cats" (Germany-only release)	1979	—	—	—		City Cats
"Peppermint Jack"	1979	—	—	23	JPN: 139,000	City Cats
"Hell Driver" (France-only release)	1980	—	—	—		City Cats
"High Life" (Japan-only release)	1980	—	—	34	JPN: 77,000	Marigot Bay
"Parties in a Penthouse" (Japan-only release)	1980	—	—	35	JPN: 56,000	Marigot Bay
"Take Me Don't Break Me" (Europe-only release)	1980	40	—	—		Marigot Bay
"Make Love Wherever You Can" (Japan-only release)	1980	—	—	38	JPN: 68,000	Midnight Dancer
"Love Is Just a Game" (Australia-only release)	1980	—	—	—		Friday Night
"Marigot Bay" (Europe-only release)	1980	8	17	—		Marigot Bay
"Midnight Dancer" (Japan-only release)	1981	—	—	46	JPN: 79,000	Midnight Dancer
"In for a Penny, in for a Pound"	1981	25	—	13	JPN: 156,000	In for a Penny
"Billy's Barbeque" (Japan-only release)	1981	—	—	26	JPN: 68,000	In for a Penny
"Hit the Jackpot" (Japan-only release)	1981	—	—	49	JPN: 44,000	Caballero
"Indio Boy" (Germany-only release)	1982	75	—	—		In for a Penny
"Tall Story Teller" / "Caballero" (Note: Same coupling in Japan and Germany. But In Japan, "Caballero" is A-side. In Germany, "Tall Story Teller" is A-side.)	1982	56	—	— 54	JPN: 43,000	Caballero
"Young Fingers Get Burnt" (Japan-only release)	1982	—	—	62	JPN: 27,000	Why No Reply
"Why No Reply"	1982	—	—	70	JPN: 15,000	Why No Reply
"Jingle Jangle Joe" (Canada-only release)	1983	—	—	—		Marigot Bay
"Pack It Up" (Japan-only release)	1983	—	—	—		Loser Pays the Piper
"Sunrise in Your Eyes" (Germany-only release)	1983	—	—	—		Loser Pays the Piper
"Dance Dance Dance" (Japan-only release)	1983	—	—	—		Loser Pays the Piper
"Loser Pays the Piper" (Japan-only release)	1983	—	—	—		Loser Pays the Piper
"Heart on Fire" (Japan-only release)	1984	—	—	—		Loser Pays the Piper
"Time to Say "Good Bye""	1985	—	—	—		Time to Say "Good Bye"
"Satisfaction" (Italy-only release)	1985	—	—	—		Non-album single
"Ecstasy" (Europe-only release)	1986	—	—	—		Time to Say "Good Bye"
"Marigot Bay 2008" (feat. Michaela Rose)	2008	—	—	—		Non-album singles
"Dance into the Moonlight" (feat. Michaela Rose)	2014	—	—	—		Non-album singles
"Zanzibar" (feat. Michaela Rose)	2017	—	—	—		Non-album singles
"—" denotes releases that did not chart or were not released in that territory.

== Rouge discography ==
=== Albums ===
Title	Album details
Rouge	Released: 21 December 1988; Label: Fun House; Formats: CD

=== Singles ===
Title	Year
"I Wanna Take Your Body" (Europe-only release)	1985
"Hold On" (Europe-only release)	1986
"The Leader of the Pack / Remember" (Germany-only release)	1986
"Einer von uns" (Germany-only release)	1987
"Love Live Operator" (Germany-only release)	1987
"Koiwa No Time"	1988
