= Mat Maitland =

English visual artist

Mat Maitland is an English art director and visual artist who lives in London. He is renowned for his photo collage works and for co-creating numerous music campaigns.

== Career ==
Maitland started his career at WEA (Warner Bros. Records) as a designer. In the early-2000s he joined Big Active where he has acted as creative director on numerous music campaigns such as Basement Jaxx, Goldfrapp, Simian (for which he received 2 Music Week CADS awards), Mark Ronson, Elton John, Michael Jackson and Beck winning a D&AD Yellow Pencil. He is also an image and film maker producing collage works, which absorb the worlds of fashion, pop culture and art. His images and films have been commissioned by fashion clients such as Louis Vuitton, Kenzo, Bulgari and Hermès and in various magazines such as V Magazine, Vanity Fair, Interview, Vogue Japan and Harper's Bazaar.

In 2014, Maitland created the record covers for Xscape, a posthumous album of Michael Jackson unreleased tracks.

== Awards ==
2007 D&AD Yellow Pencil / Global Awards for Outstanding Achievement / Graphic Design Record Sleeves 'Beck's The Information'

== List of artwork contributions ==
- Eddi Reader – Eddi Reader (1994)
- 808 State – Don Solaris (1996)
- Basement Jaxx - Rooty (2001)
- Simian - Chemistry Is What We Are (2001)
- Goldfrapp - Black Cherry (2003)
- Goldfrapp - Supernature (2005)
- Beck - The Information (2006)
- Goldfrapp - Seventh Tree (2008)
- Basement Jaxx - Scars (2009)
- Marina and the Diamonds - The Family Jewels (2010)
- Goldfrapp - Head First (2010)
- Noah and the Whale - Last Night on Earth (2011)
- Nero - Welcome Reality (2011)
- Totally Enormous Extinct Dinosaurs - Trouble (2012)
- London Grammar - If You Wait (2013)
- Goldfrapp - Tales of Us (2013)
- Elton John - The Diving Board (2013)
- Sub Focus - Torus (2013)
- Michael Jackson - Xscape (2014)
- Prince - Fall In Love 2Nite (2014)
- Lana Del Rey - Ultraviolence (2014)
- Galantis - Pharmacy (2015)
- Giorgio Moroder - Déjà Vu (2015)
- Rhodes - Wishes (2015)
- Lana Del Rey - Honeymoon (2015)
- Shura - Nothing's Real (2016)
- Elton John - Wonderful Crazy Night (2016)
- Josef Salvat - Night Swim (2016)
- Nao - For All We Know (2016)
- Lana Del Rey - Lust For Life (2017)
- Galantis - The Aviary (2017)
- Taylor Swift - Reputation (2017)
- Betsy - Betsy (2017)
- Goldfrapp - Silver Eye (2017)
- Clean Bandit - What Is Love? (2018)
- Fickle Friends - You Are Someone Else (2018)
- MIKA - My Name Is Michael Holbrook (2019)
- La Roux - Supervision (2020)
- Josef Salvat - Modern Anxiety (2020)
- Jessie Ware - What's Your Pleasure? (2020)
- Joy Crookes - Skin (2021)
- Josef Salvat - Islands (2022)
- Elton John - The Lockdown Sessions (2022)
- Bonobo - Fragments (2022)
- FKJ - Vincent (2022)
- Alison Goldfrapp - The Love Invention (2023)
- Sub Focus - Evolve (2023)
- Alison Goldfrapp - The Love Reinvention (2023)
- MIKA - Que Ta Tête Fleurisse Toujours (2023)
- Empire Of The Sun - Ask That God (2024)
- Kali Uchis - Orquideas (2024)
- Alison Goldfrapp - Flux (2025)
- Kali Uchis - Sincerely (2025)
- Elton John / Brandi Carlile - Who Believes In Angels? (2025)
- Rialto - Neon & Ghost Signs (2025)
