= Josef Salvat discography =

- Studio albums: 3
- EPs: 2
- Singles: 14

Australian singer and songwriter Josef Salvat has released three studio albums, two extended plays, and fourteen singles (including three as a featured artist).

== Albums ==
=== Studio albums ===
| Title | Album details | Peak chart positions | | | |
| Title | Album details | BEL (FL) | BEL (WA) | FRA | SCO |
|---|---|---|---|---|---|
| Night Swim | Released: 23 October 2015; Label: Sony, Liberation; Formats: CD, digital download | 169 | 31 | 23 | 87 |
| modern anxiety | Scheduled: 15 May 2020; Label: Sony, Liberation; Formats: CD, digital download, streaming | — | — | — | — |
| Islands | Scheduled: 18 February 2022; Label: Sony, Liberation; Formats: CD, digital download, streaming | — | — | — | — |
"—" denotes a recording that did not chart or was not released in that territory.

== EPs ==
| Title | EP details |
|---|---|
| In Your Prime | Released: 19 September 2014; Label: Sony, Liberation; Format: CD, digital download |
| The Close / Le Réveil | Released: 26 March 2021; Label: Leafy Outlook; Format: digital download |

== Singles ==
| Single | Year | Peak chart positions | | | | | | | Album |
| Single | Year | AUT | BEL (FL) | BEL (WA) | FRA | GER | SWI | UK | Album |
|---|---|---|---|---|---|---|---|---|---|
| "Diamonds" | 2014 | 46 | — | 18 | 2 | 11 | 42 | 72 | Night Swim |
| "Open Season" | 2014 | — | — (Note: "Open Season" did not enter the Ultratop 50, but peaked at number 40 on the Flemish Ultratip chart.) | 8 | 10 (Note: The French-English version of "Open Season" charted in France.) | — | — | — | Night Swim |
| "Hustler" | 2015 | — | — (Note: "Hustler" did not enter the Ultratop 50, but peaked at number 64 on the Flemish Ultratip chart.) | — | — | — | — | — | Night Swim |
| "Till I Found You" | 2015 | — | — | — | — | — | — | — | Night Swim |
| "Night Swim" | 2015 | — | — | — | — | — | — | — | Night Swim |
| "Paradise" | 2016 | — | — | — | 197 | — | — | — | Night Swim |
| "Closer" | 2016 | — | — | — | — | — | — | — | Night Swim |
| "Modern Anxiety" | 2019 | — | — | — | — | — | — | — | Modern Anxiety |
| "In the Afternoon" | 2020 | — | — | — | — | — | — | — | Modern Anxiety |
| "Paper Moons" | 2020 | — | — | — | — | — | — | — | Modern Anxiety |
| "First Time" | 2020 | — | — | — | — | — | — | — | The Close / Le Réveil |
| "I'm Sorry" | 2021 | — | — | — | — | — | — | — | Islands |
| "The Drum" | 2021 | — | — | — | — | — | — | — | Islands |
| "Promiscuity" | 2022 | — | — | — | — | — | — | — | Islands |
"—" denotes a recording that did not chart or was not released in that territory.

=== As featured artist ===
| Title | Year | Peak chart positions | | Album |
| Title | Year | US Dance | US Dance Digital | Album |
|---|---|---|---|---|
| "Holding On" (Tourist featuring Josef Salvat and Niia) | 2015 | – | – | Non-album singles |
| "Heading Home" (GRYFFIN featuring Josef Salvat) | 2016 | 22 | 21 | Non-album singles |
| "Time" (The Avener featuring Josef Salvat) | 2019 | – | – | Heaven |
