= We Are Your Friends =

We Are Your Friends may refer to:

- We Are Your Friends (Simian album), a 2002 album by Simian
- "We Are Your Friends" (song), a 2006 song by "Justice vs Simian"
- We Are Your Friends (film), a 2015 film
  - We Are Your Friends (soundtrack), the soundtrack for the film
