= City Cats =

Single by Arabesque

from the album Peppermint Jack
- B-side: In the Heat of a Disco Night
- Released: 1979
- Recorded: July 1979
- Studio: Europasound Studios, Offenbach
- Genre: Euro disco, pop
- Length: 3:02
- Label: EMI Electrola
- Songwriter(s): Jean Frankfurter; John Moering
- Producer(s): Wolfgang Mewes

Arabesque singles chronology
"Friday Night" (1979)	"City Cats" (1979)	"Peppermint Jack" (1979)

"City Cats" is a 1979 single by the European disco group Arabesque. It is Sandra's first single with Arabesque, following her integration into the group in August 1979 at just 17 years old. Sandra sang the lead, accompanied by Jasmin Vetter and Michaela Rose as backing singers. City Cats is considered a debut song for the group, as Sandra, Jasmin and Michaela officially became the three permanent members of the group following the release of the single. It was released in Germany, France, and several other countries. Lyrically, the song symbolizes the three singers as "cats", and tells the story of their search for Tom Cat. In live performances of the song, the group was noted for wearing colorful and daring "cat" costumes.

== Track listing ==
1. A. "City Cats" – 3:02
2. B. "In The Heat Of A Disco Night" – 3:18
