= We Are Your Friends (soundtrack) =

We Are Your Friends (Music from the Original Motion Picture)

Soundtrack album by various artists
- Released: August 21, 2015
- Genre: Electronic dance music; hip hop; electronic rock; alternative rock
- Length: 50:24 (standard); 78:07 (deluxe)
- Label: Interscope

We Are Your Friends (Music from the Original Motion Picture) is the soundtrack to the 2015 film of the same name. Released by Interscope Records on August 21, 2015, the album featured 12 tracks based on electronic dance music, hip hop, electronic rock and alternative rock. All of the tracks were selected by the music supervisor, Randall Poster, with contributions from DJs producing the album. A deluxe edition of the album featuring six more additional tracks also unveiled on August 28, the same date as the film. Although the film received mixed reviews, the soundtrack topped the Billboard Dance/Electronic Albums selling over 2,000 copies.

== Background ==
"At first I wanted this movie to be an excuse to put in all my favourite electronic music, but then you have to be true and authentic to who [the characters] are and what they would be listening to."

— Max Joseph

The album featured contributions from rappers and disc jockeys producing the film's music. Director Max Joseph recalled that "the story of the young adult coming into their own and finding their way into the world is always best set to the music of that moment, and I really think that dance music is the soundtrack of right now. We didn't want to just focus on one genre … We wanted to create a balance of everything."

Some of his favourite tracks include The Rapture's "Sister Saviour" which Efron played at the pool party, but its record label DFA Records, which produced the song, "has a very New York, almost European sound to it which didn't always mesh with the Southern California early-20-something, festival-going vibe which is where these guys are coming from", which wanted him to be really authentic to the world they come from.

== Reception ==
R. J. Cabral of The Hollywood Reporter complimented that the soundtrack is "effectively deployed" and featured "melodic hooks set to skipping, skittering beats". Katherine Cusumano of Bustle wrote "We Are Your Friends' eponymous soundtrack combines some of the most famous names in EDM with some of the most obscure, and works its way through a whole host of styles that fit into the genre as a whole. It would be a great addition to an already quite comprehensive set of songs."

Gabriela Tully Claymore of Stereogum commented the music saying "We Are Your Friends is edited to mirror its soundtrack, each scene drags on just long enough to cut at the warble that precedes a bass drop, and though party scenes abound, they're always pointed. Those scenes propel the plot forward and are soundtracked by the most memorable songs." Reviewing for the film's score, he further commented "The score that accompanied the soundtrack was produced by Segal, who is best known for his work on the UK version of Skins, which is fitting. His is the stuff that makes surround-sound systems shake, and We Are Your Friends does just as good of a job as that TV show does at making cinematic hedonism look like a lot of fun until it's not."

A review from Mixmag, called the soundtrack as "strictly EDM", while Spencer Kornhaber of The Atlantic called it as "pulse-quickening". Another review for The Sight and Sounds summarised "WAYF Soundtrack contains a lot of current music that was not written specifically for the film. Yes, there are good tracks here, but none of these tracks will more than likely have a lasting affect beyond 2014 and 2015 and almost certainly nothing on the soundtrack will ever be as genre and era defining as anything on the Saturday Night Fever soundtrack."

== Track listing ==
We Are Your Friends (Music from the Original Motion Picture) track listing
No.	Title	Artist(s)	Length
1.	"I Can Be Somebody"	Deorro featuring Erin McCarley	4:36
2.	"Desire" (Gryffin Remix)	Years & Years	4:28
3.	"Break Yourself"	Hook n Sling featuring Far East Movement and Pusha T	3:21
4.	"BlackOut"	The Americanos featuring Lil Jon, Juicy J and Tyga	3:34
5.	"Something About You" (Pete Tong Kingstown Remix)	Hayden James	3:12
6.	"Ah Yeah So What" (WAYF Edit)	Will Sparks featuring Wiley and Elen Levon	3:27
7.	"You Know You Like It" (Tchami Remix)	AlunaGeorge	5:04
8.	"Define"	Dom Dolla and Go Freek	3:50
9.	"Cole's Memories" (Original Mix)	Pyramid	5:51
10.	"Younger" (Kygo Remix)	Seinabo Sey	5:51
11.	"We Are Your Friends"	Justice vs. Simian	4:18
12.	"The Drop" (VIP Mix)	Bro Safari	2:52
Total length:			50:24

We Are Your Friends (Music from the Original Motion Picture) deluxe edition
No.	Title	Artist(s)	Length
1.	"I Can Be Somebody"	Deorro featuring Erin McCarley	4:36
2.	"Desire" (Gryffin Remix)	Years & Years	4:28
3.	"Break Yourself"	Hook N Sling featuring Far East Movement and Pusha T	3:21
4.	"BlackOut"	The Americanos featuring Lil Jon, Juicy J and Tyga	3:34
5.	"Another Sky" (The Magician Remix)	Scenic	6:40
6.	"Something About You" (Pete Tong Kingstown Remix)	Hayden James	3:12
7.	"RIVA" (Restart the Game)	Klingande featuring Broken Back	5:15
8.	"Ah Yeah So What" (WAYF Edit)	Will Sparks featuring Wiley and Elen Levon	3:27
9.	"You Know You Like It" (Tchami Remix)	AlunaGeorge	5:04
10.	"Define"	Dom Dolla and Go Freek	3:50
11.	"Pushing On"	Oliver $ and Jimi Jules	2:42
12.	"Younger" (Kygo Remix)	Seinabo Sey	5:51
13.	"Cole's Memories" (Original Mix)	Pyramid	5:51
14.	"Sister Saviour" (DFA Dub)	The Rapture	4:25
15.	"I Think I Like It"	Fake Blood	5:34
16.	"The Drop" (VIP Mix)	Bro Safari	2:52
17.	"I Like Tuh"	Carnage featuring ILoveMakonnen	3:07
18.	"We Are Your Friends"	Justice vs. Simian	4:18
Total length:			78:07

== Charts ==
Chart performance for We Are Your Friends (Music from the Original Motion Picture)
Chart (2012)	Peak position
UK Compilation Albums (OCC)	97
UK Album Downloads (OCC)	82
UK Soundtrack Albums (OCC)	14
US Dance/Electronic Albums (Billboard)	1
US Soundtrack Albums (Billboard)	10
