= Hey Hi Hello =

Hey Hi Hello may refer to:

- Hey Hi Hello, a memoir by Annie Nightingale
- "Hey Hi Hello", a song by Alison Goldfrapp from Flux
- "Hey Hi Hello", a song by Danny and Alex
- "Hey Hi Hello", a song by Shaun Baker (musician)
