= The Love Invention =

Studio album by Alison Goldfrapp
- Released: 12 May 2023
- Recorded: 2021–2023
- Studio: Miloco (London); London Lane (London)
- Genre: Synth disco
- Length: 46:50
- Label: Skint
- Producer: Alison Goldfrapp; Claptone; James Greenwood; Richard X; Toby Scott

Alison Goldfrapp chronology
| The Love Invention (2023) | Flux (2025) |

Singles from The Love Invention
- 1. "Digging Deeper" Released: 19 January 2023; 2. "Fever" Released: 16 February 2023; 3. "So Hard So Hot" Released: 16 March 2023; 4. "NeverStop" Released: 14 April 2023; 5. "Love Invention" Released: 28 April 2023; 6. "In Electric Blue" Released: 7 June 2023

The Love Invention is the debut solo studio album by British singer and musician Alison Goldfrapp. It was released on 12 May 2023 as her first full-length project under her own name, away from her efforts as part of electropop duo Goldfrapp. Singles from the album include "Digging Deeper" featuring Claptone, "Fever" featuring Paul Woolford, and "So Hard So Hot".

== Background and promotion ==
Towards the end of 2019, Goldfrapp and Will Gregory were due to mark the 20th anniversary of their debut album Felt Mountain with the Felt Mountain: The 20th Year Tour in March and April 2020. However, due to the disruption of the COVID-19 pandemic in 2020, the tour was postponed and eventually rescheduled to 2022.

During the pandemic, Goldfrapp began working on solo music. In 2022, she appeared on the single "Impossible" with Norwegian duo Röyksopp. It was her first release credited to her full name. The song featured on the duo's 2022 album Profound Mysteries. Goldfrapp also appeared on "The Night" on Profound Mysteries III, released the same year.

== Singles ==
In March 2023, she released "So Hard So Hot", the first official single from the album.

"Digging Deeper", featuring German duo Claptone, was released as a promotional single on 19 January 2023. "Fever", with Paul Woolford, was released the following month. Goldfrapp later described them as "collaborative remixes" of original songs that were to be included on her debut album. Producers Richard X and James Greenwood contributed to the album. Richard X also featured on Goldfrapp's 2010 album Head First.

== Critical reception ==
Professional ratings
Aggregate scores
| Source | Rating |
|---|---|
| AnyDecentMusic? | 7.6/10 |
| Metacritic | 78/100 |
Review scores
| Source | Rating |
| AllMusic | 4/5 stars |
| Clash | 9/10 |
| DIY | 4/5 stars |
| Evening Standard | 4/5 stars |
| Exclaim! | 8/10 |
| Mojo | 4/5 stars |
| musicOMH | 4/5 stars |
| Pitchfork | 6.8/10 |
| Record Collector | 4/5 stars |
| The Telegraph | 4/5 stars |

The Love Invention received a score of 78 out of 100 on review aggregator Metacritic based on 14 critics' reviews, indicating "generally favorable" reception. Harry Tafoya, reviewing the album for Pitchfork, wrote that The Love Invention "sets [Goldfrapp] against sleek synth disco that she mostly complements rather than commands" and remarked that the album's "best moments are its quietest", highlighting "Hotel" and more particularly "SloFlo", the latter of which Tafoya called "a trick of light and shadow more impressive than the album's more labored vamping".

== Track listing ==
The Love Invention track listing
| No. | Title | Writer(s) | Producer(s) | Length |
|---|---|---|---|---|
| 1. | "NeverStop" | Alison Goldfrapp; Richard X | Goldfrapp; Richard X | 4:34 |
| 2. | "Love Invention" | Goldfrapp; Richard X; James Greenwood | Goldfrapp; Richard X; Greenwood | 4:19 |
| 3. | "Digging Deeper Now" | Goldfrapp; Richard X; Greenwood | Goldfrapp; Richard X; Greenwood | 4:16 |
| 4. | "In Electric Blue" | Goldfrapp; Toby Scott; Olivia Sebastianelli | Goldfrapp; Richard X; Scott | 3:19 |
| 5. | "The Beat Divine" | Goldfrapp; Richard X | Goldfrapp; Richard X | 5:09 |
| 6. | "Fever (This Is the Real Thing)" | Goldfrapp; Richard X; Greenwood | Goldfrapp; Richard X; Greenwood | 4:43 |
| 7. | "Hotel (Suite 23)" | Goldfrapp; Richard X; Hannah Robinson | Goldfrapp; Richard X | 4:35 |
| 8. | "Subterfuge" | Goldfrapp; Greenwood | Goldfrapp; Greenwood | 3:13 |
| 9. | "Gatto Gelato" | Goldfrapp; Richard X | Goldfrapp; Richard X | 4:36 |
| 10. | "So Hard So Hot" | Goldfrapp; Greenwood | Goldfrapp; Greenwood | 4:27 |
| 11. | "SloFlo" | Goldfrapp; Greenwood | Goldfrapp; Greenwood | 3:39 |
| Total length: | | | | 46:50 |

Digital edition bonus disc
| No. | Title | Writer(s) | Producer(s) | Length |
|---|---|---|---|---|
| 1. | "Fever" (with Paul Woolford) | Goldfrapp; Richard X; Greenwood | Goldfrapp; Richard X; Greenwood; Woolford | 3:48 |
| 2. | "Digging Deeper" (with Claptone) | Goldfrapp; Richard X; Greenwood | Goldfrapp; Richard X; Greenwood; Claptone | 3:17 |
| 3. | "Impossible" (with Röyksopp; Alison's "Touch the Sky" edit) | Goldfrapp; Svein Berge; Torbjørn Brundtland | Goldfrapp; Röyksopp; Scott^{[a]} | 3:11 |
| 4. | "Gatto Gelato" (niina remix) | Goldfrapp; Richard X | Goldfrapp; Richard X; niina | 3:45 |
| 5. | "Fever" (with Paul Woolford; Special Request club mix) | Goldfrapp; Richard X; Greenwood | Woolford | 9:09 |
| 6. | "Digging Deeper" (with Claptone; extended mix) | Goldfrapp; Richard X; Greenwood | Goldfrapp; Richard X; Greenwood; Claptone | 6:09 |
| Total length: | | | | 76:09 |

Notes

- ^{^[a]} signifies an additional producer.
- "Digging Deeper" with Claptone is a remix of "Digging Deeper Now".
- "Fever" with Paul Woolford is a remix of "Fever (This Is the Real Thing)".

== Personnel ==
- Alison Goldfrapp – vocals, art direction
- John Davis – mastering
- Pete Hofmann – mixing
- Richard X – mixing (tracks 1–7, 9), engineering (all tracks)
- James Greenwood – engineering
- Tom Archer – engineering
- Calum Landau – engineering
- Sam Baker – engineering
- Jonny Leslie – engineering
- Mat Maitland – art direction, photography, imagery, design
- Beth Fenton – styling
- Goom Heo – clothing
- Toby Scott – keyboards, programming (track 4)

== Charts ==
Chart performance for The Love Invention
| Chart (2023) | Peak position |
|---|---|
| Australian Hitseekers Albums (ARIA) | 6 |
| Belgian Albums (Ultratop Flanders) | 115 |
| Belgian Albums (Ultratop Wallonia) | 54 |
| German Albums (Offizielle Top 100) | 39 |
| Scottish Albums (OCC) | 1 |
| Spanish Albums (PROMUSICAE) | 74 |
| Swiss Albums (Schweizer Hitparade) | 25 |
| UK Albums (OCC) | 6 |
| UK Independent Albums (OCC) | 1 |

Chart performance for The Love Reinvention
| Chart (2023) | Peak position |
|---|---|
| UK Album Downloads (OCC) | 35 |
