= The Antidote (The Wiseguys album) =

Studio album by The Wiseguys
- Released: 5 October 1998
- Studio: Milo Studios, London; Organic Studios, New York City
- Genre: Big beat, instrumental hip hop
- Length: 73:43
- Label: Wall of Sound
- Producer: Touché & Regal

The Wiseguys chronology
Executive Suite (1996)	The Antidote (1998)

Singles from The Antidote
- 1. "Ooh La La" Released: 1998; 2. "Start the Commotion" Released: 1998

Professional ratings
Review scores
Source	Rating
AllMusic	4/5 stars
NME	7/10
Pitchfork	7.9/10

The Antidote is the second and final studio album by the Wiseguys, released through Wall of Sound on 5 October 1998. It peaked at number 133 on the Billboard 200 chart. The album spawned two singles, "Ooh La La" and "Start the Commotion".

== Track listing ==
No.	Title	Length
1.	"Re-Introduction"	2:38
2.	"Ooh La La"	5:53
3.	"We Be the Crew..."	5:49
4.	"Experience" (featuring Season, Sense Live, and Jerry Beeks)	5:14
5.	"Cowboy '78"	6:14
6.	"Search's End"	7:09
7.	"The Grabbing Hands" (featuring Joie Bunsen, Season, and L.E.W)	4:34
8.	"The Temple"	0:49
9.	"Start the Commotion"	5:51
10.	"Face the Flames"	6:10
11.	"Who the Hell?" (featuring Sense Live)	4:13
12.	"The Executives"	4:40
13.	"Au Pair Girls"	6:10
14.	"Production" (featuring Sense Live, Tito-T, Mr. Mojo, and Season)	3:31
15.	"The Bounce"	4:51

Japanese edition bonus track
No.	Title	Length
16.	"Expand on the Topic" (featuring Season, Sense Live, and J-Nise)	4:13

== Personnel ==
Credits adapted from liner notes.

- Touché – production, arrangements, turntables, recording and mixing
- Regal - production, arrangements, turntables, mixing and sampling
- Laurence Diana – recording and mixing
- Tim Shanley – engineering
- Mike Marsh – mastering
- Eric Hine – mastering
- Mark Jones – executive production

== Charts ==
Chart performance for The Antidote
Chart (1998–2001)	Peak position
Australian Albums (ARIA)	89
UK Albums (OCC)	124
UK Independent Albums (OCC)	20
US Billboard 200	133
US Heatseekers Albums (Billboard)	2
US Top Dance Albums (Billboard)	3
