= Marigot Bay =

Body of water in Saint Lucia

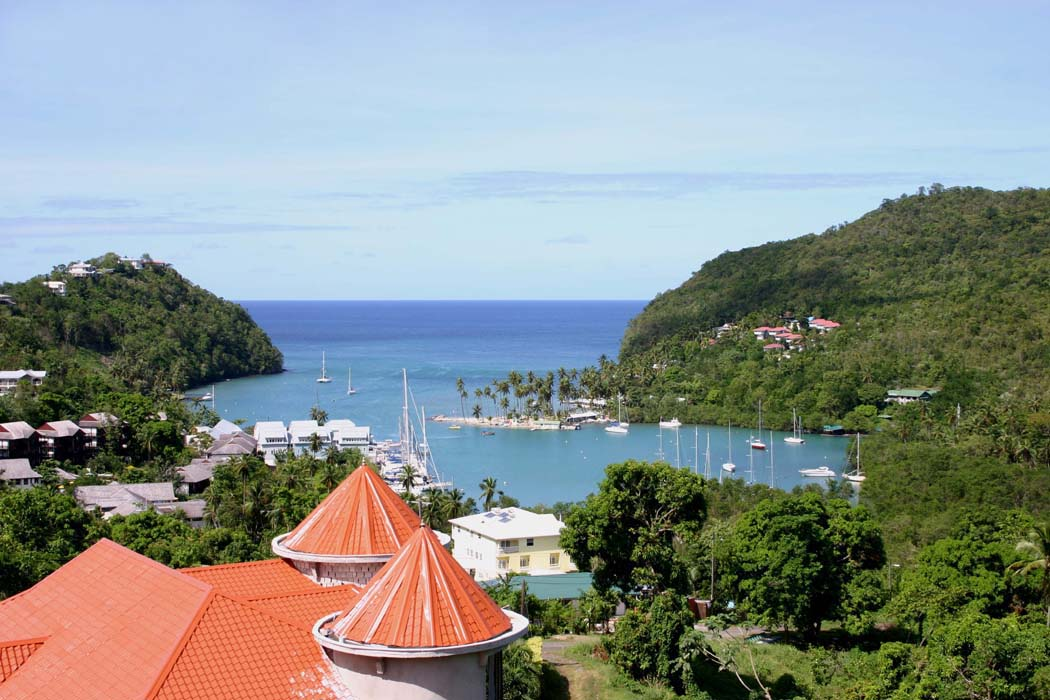
- Marigot Bay

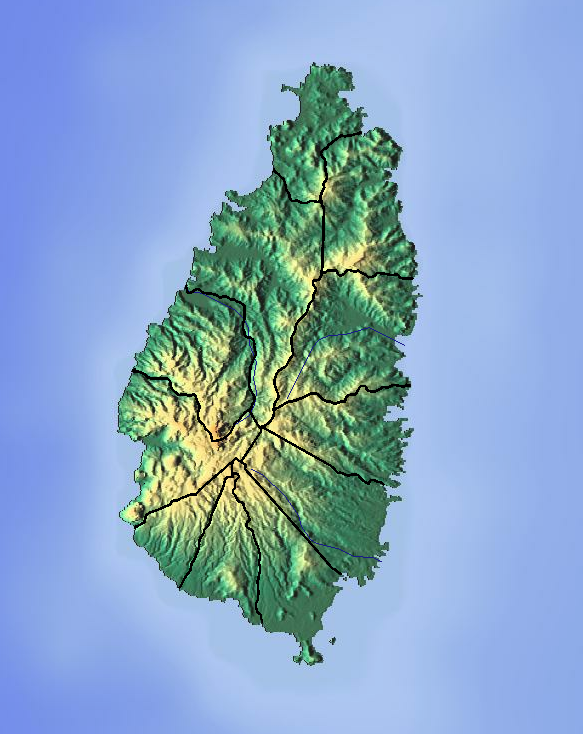
- Location of Bay
- Location: Castries District, Saint Lucia
- Coordinates: 13°57′50″N 61°01′34″W
- Part of: Caribbean Sea

Marigot Bay is located on the western coast of the Caribbean island country of Saint Lucia, 3.75 miles southwest from Castries and a short distance from the Saint Lucian National Marine Reserve. It is surrounded on three sides by steep, forested hills.

== History ==
The inland portion of the bay forms a hurricane hole, used to shelter boats from hurricanes.

Marigot Bay is a historic landmark, having been used by the French and British navies before and after a number of nearby battles. It is widely claimed that a British fleet under Admiral Barrington hid from French pursuers within the bay, in some retellings attaching palm fronds to their masts in order to disguise themselves amongst the trees however this story is likely to be apocryphal, with no primary source evidence to support this.

The bay was used as the setting for the 1967 film adaptation of Hugh Lofting's Doctor Dolittle books. Scenes of the shipwreck, Great Pink Sea Snail, and the construction of the harness for the Giant Lunar Moth were filmed in the bay.

The American novelist James A. Michener, in his 1978 novel Chesapeake, famously described the bay as "The most beautiful bay in the Caribbean".

The all-girl trio Arabesque featured a song "Marigot Bay" appearing on the album of the same name in 1980.

== Region ==
The second-order administrative region of Castries District is called Marigot and has a population of 769. The populated towns within this region are Marigot (13°58′02″N 61°00′49″W) and Marigot Bay (13°57′50″N 61°01′34″W). The water body is referred to as Marigot Harbor (13°57′58″N 61°01′36″W). There is also a Marigot Point (13°58′13″N 61°01′45″W).

== Gallery ==
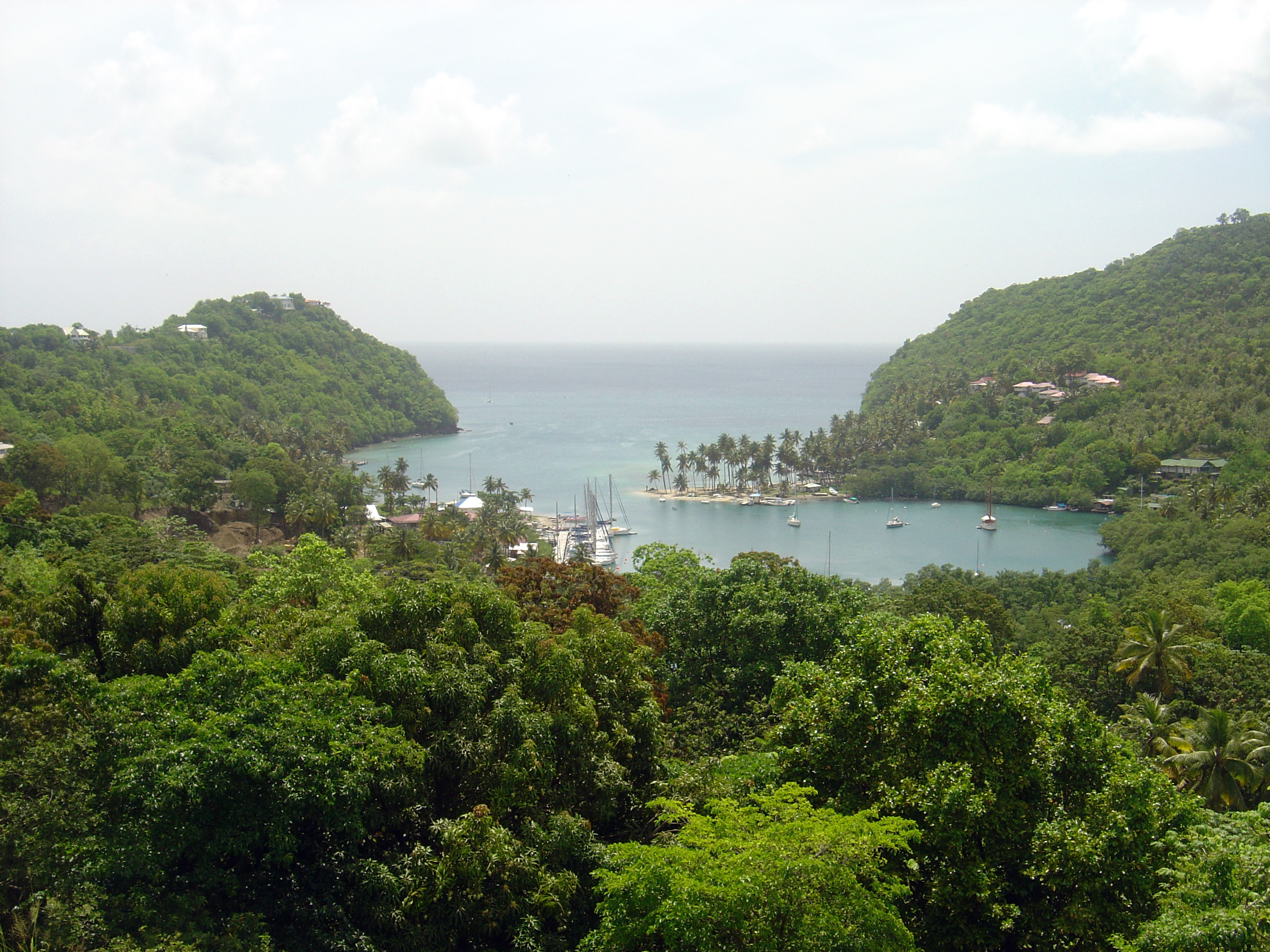

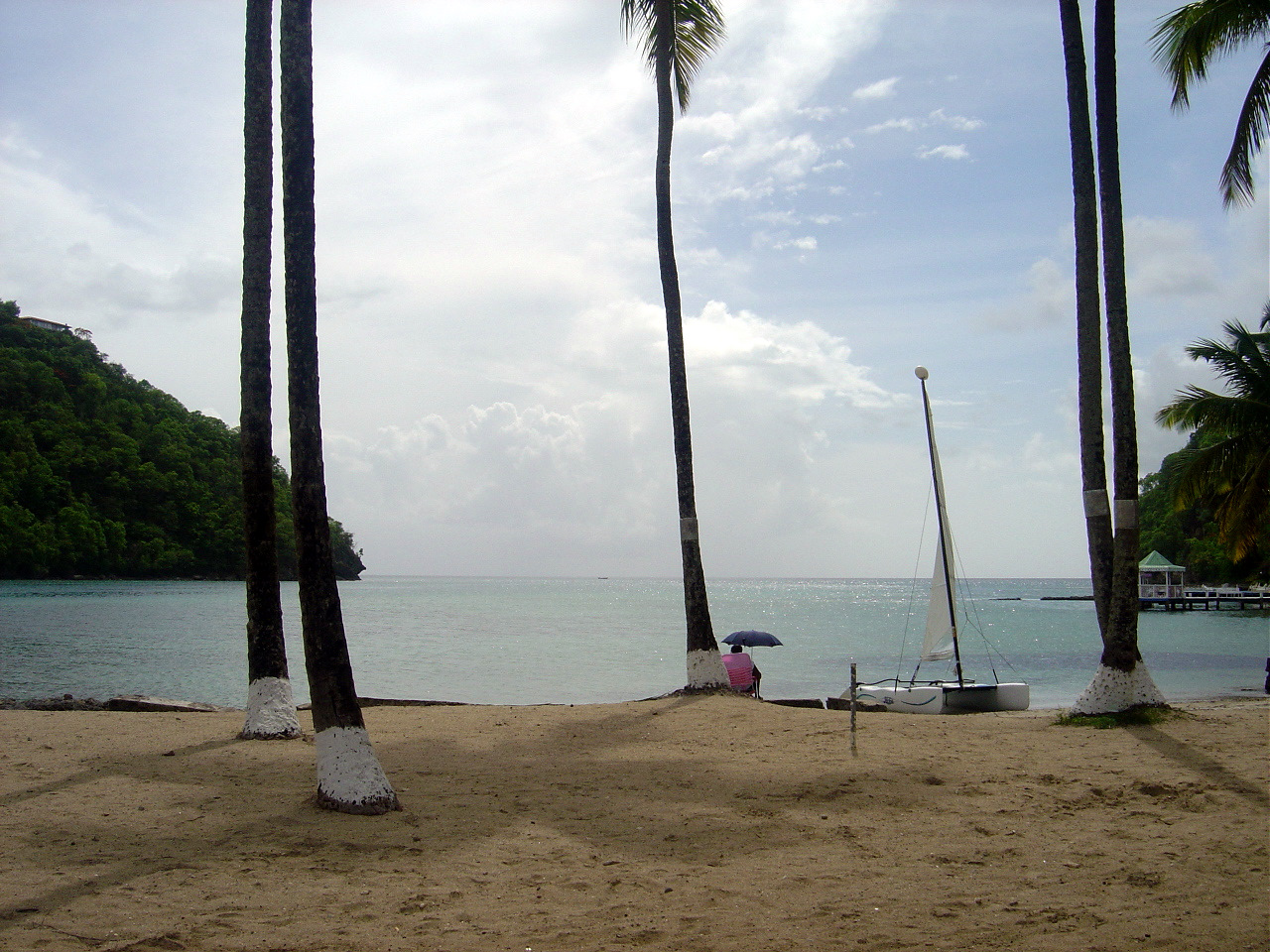

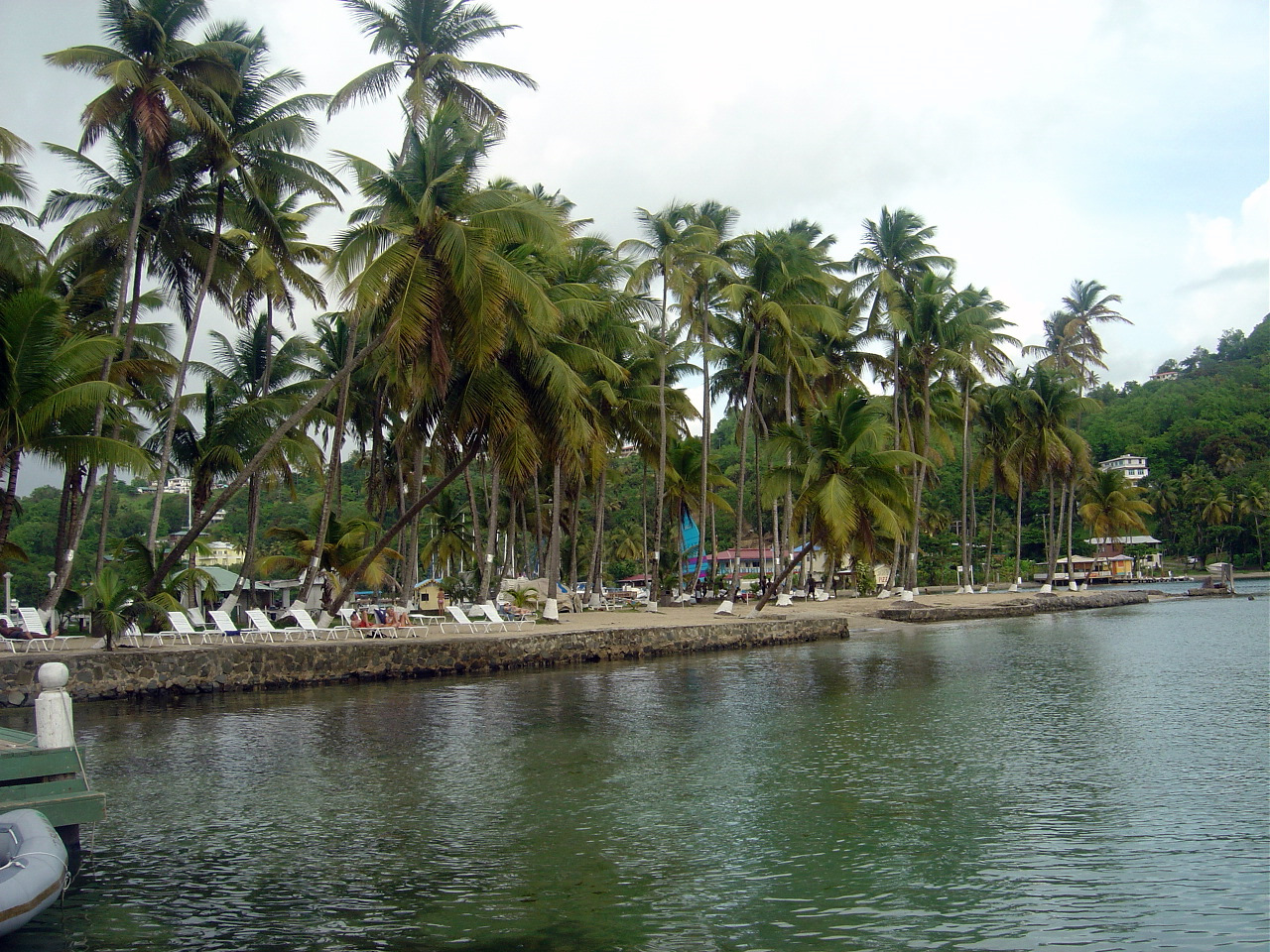

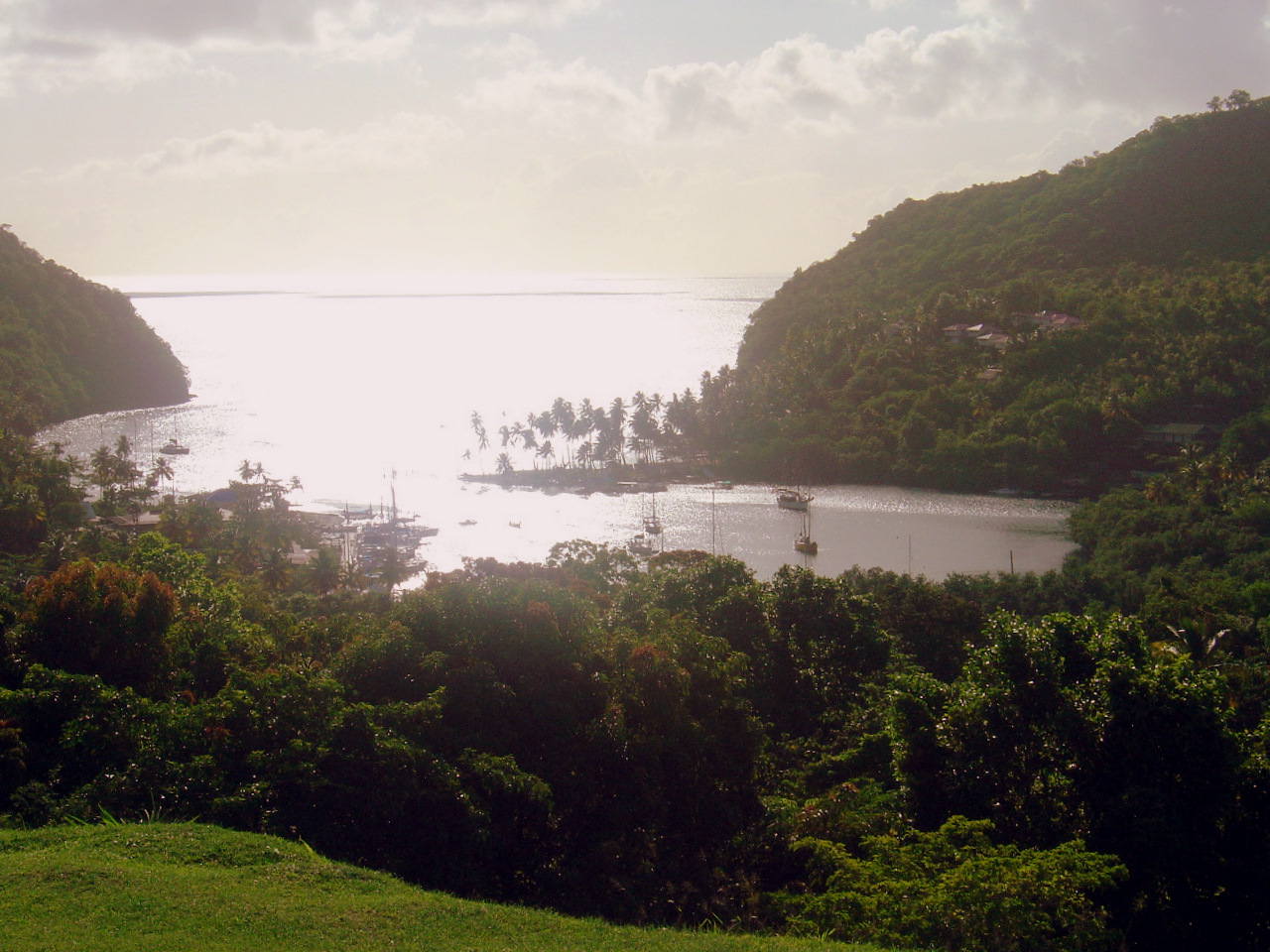

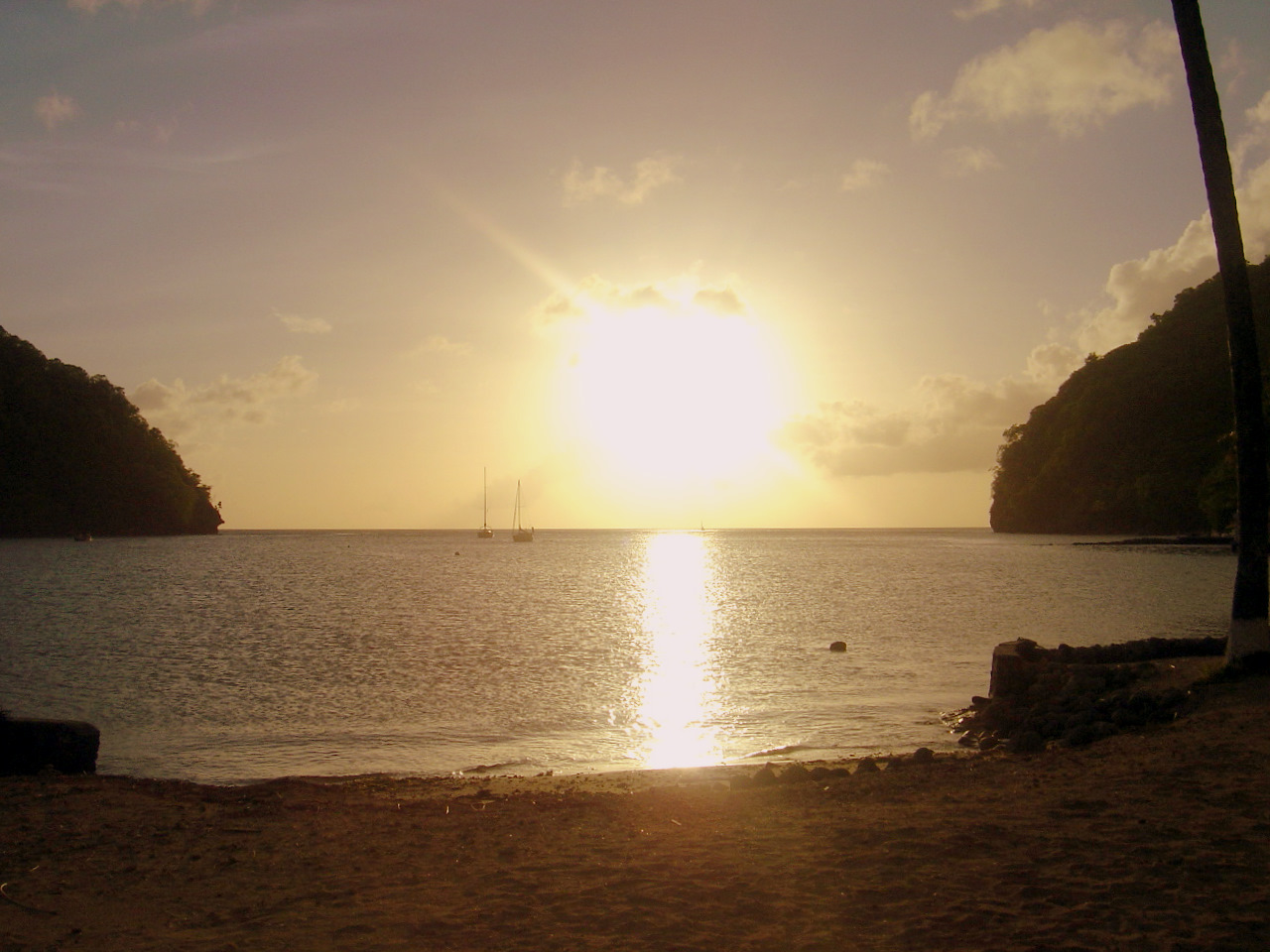

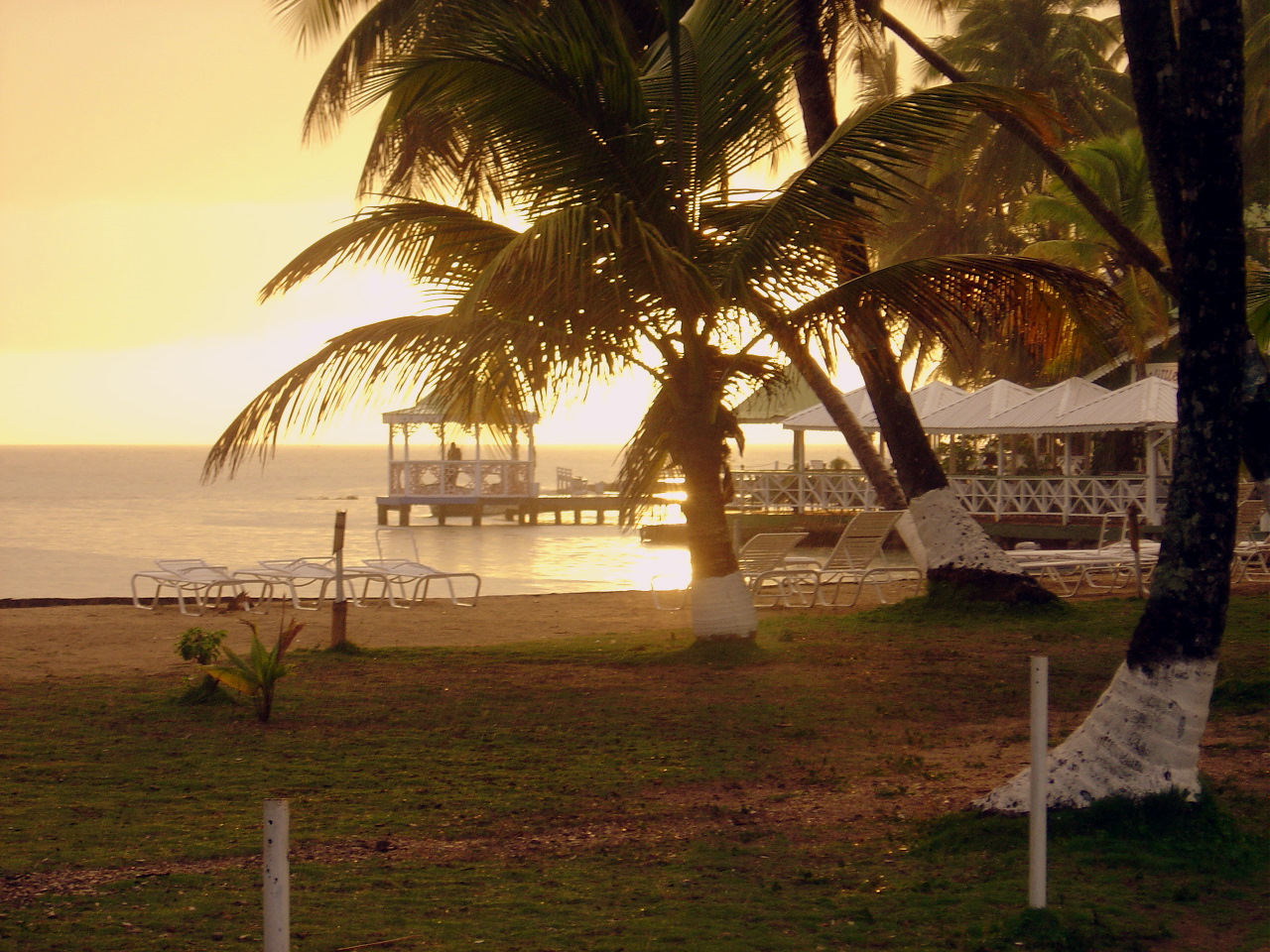
