= Gun Shy (2000 film) =

- Theatrical release poster
- Directed by: Eric Blakeney
- Written by: Eric Blakeney
- Produced by: Sandra Bullock
- Starring: Liam Neeson; Oliver Platt; Sandra Bullock; José Zúñiga; Richard Schiff; Mary McCormack; Mitch Pileggi
- Cinematography: Tom Richmond
- Edited by: Pamela Martin
- Music by: Rolfe Kent
- Production company: Fortis Films
- Distributed by: Buena Vista Pictures Distribution (Note: Distributed under the Hollywood Pictures banner.)
- Release date: February 4, 2000
- Running time: 101 minutes
- Country: United States
- Language: English
- Budget: $14 million
- Box office: $3 million

Gun Shy is a 2000 American black comedy film written and directed by Eric Blakeney, and starring Liam Neeson, Oliver Platt and Sandra Bullock. Gun Shy was released by Hollywood Pictures (through Buena Vista Pictures Distribution) on February 4, 2000. The film received mixed to negative reviews from critics and was a box office bomb, grossing $3 million against a $14 million budget.

== Plot ==
Charlie Mayough is an undercover DEA agent suffering from anxiety and gastrointestinal problems after a bust goes wrong. During the aforementioned incident, his partner was killed and he found himself with a gun shoved in his face just before back-up arrived. Charlie, once known for his ease and almost "magical" talent on the job, is finding it very hard to return to work. His requests to be taken off the case or retire are denied by his bosses, Lonny Burke and Dexter Helvenshaw, as so much time was put into his cover. Charlie works with the dream of one day retiring to Ocean Views, a luxury housing complex with servants and utilities.

During his flight to New York City, where his job will resume, another passenger strikes up a conversation with him. It turns out that this man, Dr. Jeff Bleckner, is a psychiatrist and upon arriving to New York, Charlie enlists his services. Dr. Bleckner listens to his troubles and prescribes him anti-anxiety medication to help him deal with stress. He also encourages him to join a group therapy session. At therapy, Charlie meets and befriends a group of stressed out men from the business world.

To deal with his gastrointestinal issues, Charlie goes to the doctor where he meets the free-spirited and beautiful Judy Tipp, the self-proclaimed "Enema Queen" who introduces him to alternative therapies to his problems as well as some romantic interest.

Back on the job, Charlie is knee-deep in negotiations for high-stakes money laundering and stock manipulation. He was brought into the group by the passionate Fidel Vaillar and his close bodyguard, Estuvio Clavo. Vaillar is a son of an important Colombian druglord and fears being viewed as a stereotype. They are dealing with an intense man with an unpredictable temper named Fulvio Nesstra who represents the Italian mob in New York. Fulvio is the disfavored son-in-law of high-ranking Italian mobster, Carmine Minetti. Jason Cane, a young Wall Street-type with a plan, but poor taste, completes the group. Each thinks he understands the other players, but there is more to these characters than meets the eye.

== Cast ==
- Liam Neeson as DEA Agent Charlie Mayough
- Oliver Platt as Fulvio Nesstra
- Sandra Bullock as Judy Tipp
- Jose Zuniga as Fidel Vaillar
- Richard Schiff as Elliot
- Andy Lauer as Jerry M. Feinstein / Jason Cane
- Mitch Pileggi as DEA Agent Dexter Helvenshaw
- Paul Ben-Victor as Howard
- Mary McCormack as Gloria Minetti-Nesstra
- Frank Vincent as Carmine Minetti
- Michael DeLorenzo as Estuvio Clavo
- Taylor Negron as Cheemo Partelle
- Ben Weber as Mark
- Michael Mantell as Dr. Jeff Bleckner
- Louis Giambalvo as DEA Agent Lonny Burke
- Gregg Daniel as Jonathan
- Rick Peters as DEA Agent Bennett
- Dusty Kay as DEA Agent Kapstein
- Jerry Stahl as Lucien
- Michael Weatherly as DEA Agent Dave Juniper
- David Carpenter as SEC Agent Cohler
- Tommy Morgan Jr. as SEC Agent Harris
- Roy Buffington as FBI Agent Clemmens
- Hank Stratton as DEA Agent Josh
- Frankie Ray as Joey
- Joe Maruzzo as Warren Ganza
- Manny Perry as Cheemo's Bodyguard
- Tracy Zahoryin as Jason's Girlfriend
- Michelle Joyner as Elliott's Wife
- Myndy Crist as Myrna
- Stacey Hayes as Hot Girl (uncredited)

== Production ==
The film was produced by Bullock's production company, Fortis Films, and was the first film directed by Blakeney. Buena Vista Film Sales acquired and financed the film and it was distributed through Hollywood Pictures.

== Critical reception ==
Elvis Mitchell of The New York Times was not enamored with the direction, but was fond of the writing and acting.

The direction is proficient, but Mr. Blakeney has made his job look easy by shaping such a fine script. Good material certainly does a lot of the work. It gives the actors something to respond to, and they rise to the challenge."

On the review aggregator website Rotten Tomatoes, 27% of 45 critics' reviews are positive, with an average rating of 5/10. The website's consensus reads: "A dark comedy of the low brow nature -- filled with fart and gay jokes. Even Liam Neeson and Sandra Bullock cannot save this failure." Metacritic, which uses a weighted average, assigned the film a score of 42 out of 100, based on 20 critics, indicating "mixed or average" reviews.

== Soundtrack ==
The soundtrack was released on February 4, 2000, by Hollywood Records.

1. Blue Skies for Everyone - Bob Schneider
2. Under the Sun - Big Kenny
3. Drunk is Better Than Dead - The Push Stars
4. Round & Round - Bob Schneider
5. This Time - Los Lobos
6. Is It Too Late? - World Party
7. More Than Rain - Tom Waits
8. It's a Man's Man's Man's World - James Brown
9. Staysha Brown - The Scabs
10. I'm Your Boogie Man - KC and the Sunshine Band
11. Start the Commotion - The Wiseguys
12. Caro Mio Ben - Helga Bullock
