= Fly High Little Butterfly =

Single by Arabesque

from the album Friday Night
- B-side: Give It Up
- Released: 25 January 1979
- Recorded: 1978
- Genre: Euro disco, Pop
- Length: 3:26
- Label: Victor Records
- Songwriters: Jean Frankfurter; John Moering
- Producer: Wolfgang Mewes

Arabesque singles chronology
"Friday Night" (1978)	"Fly High Little Butterfly" (1979)	"Rock Me After Midnight" (1979)

Fly High Little Butterfly is a 1979 single by the European disco group Arabesque. Contrary to other releases by Arabesque, the song was not commercially released as a single in Germany, but became a moderate commercial success in Japan, where it was the fourth single cut released from the disco album Friday Night (1979). Heike Rimbeau sang the lead vocals, accompanied by Karen Ann Tepperis and Michaela Rose on backup vocals. The song tells the story of a "little butterfly" who has a passion for singing and dancing from a very young age, and strives to be like her mother, who encouraged to "fly high" and avidly pursue her goals and dreams.

"Fly High Little Butterfly" is arranged in 4/4 time and the tempo is driven by a melodic string section, electric rhythm bassline guitars and saxophone riffs over a four-on-the-floor beat.

The song was exclusively released as a single in Japan, where it stalled at #33 on the Oricon Singles charts for three weeks. It later appeared on the group's compilation albums The Best Of Volume 1 (2004) and Complete Single Collection (2010).

== Track listing ==
1. A. "Fly High Little Butterfly" - 3:26
2. B. "Give It Up" - 3:57
