= Philadelphia Virtuosi Chamber Orchestra =

Chamber orchestra based in Philadelphia

The Philadelphia Virtuosi Chamber Orchestra (PVCO) is a chamber orchestra that is located in Philadelphia, Pennsylvania, United States. It was founded in 1991 by Daniel Spalding.

== History and notable features ==
Composed of some of the Philadelphia region's foremost musicians, the Philadelphia Virtuosi Chamber Orchestra was founded in 1991 by music director and conductor Daniel Spalding. Under his baton, the orchestra has performed numerous concerts in Center City Philadelphia, as well as in unusual venues throughout the region designed to reach new audiences.

The orchestra's repertoire spans the Baroque to Modern eras. Programs often include new discoveries of less-known works, world premieres, and arrangements written especially for the Philadelphia Virtuosi, as well as standard repertoire, sometimes performed with creative visual effects such as special lighting or stage movement.

Since 1996, the Philadelphia Virtuosi has been in demand outside of its home city and is often on the road. The orchestra has performed at New York's Lincoln Center, Weill Hall at Carnegie Hall, Columbia University’s Miller Theater, the Getty Museum in Los Angeles, the Kravis Center in West Palm Beach, Colorado’s Vilar Center, the Bermuda Festival, and on three extensive tours to South America.

In 2010, this ensemble made its debut in Mexico and in Europe at the Nomus International Festival in Serbia. In November 2014, the orchestra toured Russia, presenting sold out performances at Moscow’s Tchaikovsky Hall and Saint Petersburg’s Mariinsky Theater, where Spalding's pianist partner Gabriela Imreh often accompanied the orchestra.

The Philadelphia Virtuosi Chamber Orchestra is also known for its series of recordings on Connoisseur Society, Arabesque, New World Records, New Ariel, and on Naxos. Its recording of the music of American composer George Antheil for the Naxos American Classics Series (including the enigmatic Ballet Mecanique) was the Editor’s Choice for Gramophone, chosen as CD of the week by BBC Radio 3 and the London Observer, and as one of the top 10 classical CDs of 2001 by the Chicago Tribune. A best-selling album in the United Kingdom, it was also among the best-selling CDs of Naxos in the United States.

Its CD of American composer Howard Hanson, also for Naxos, received the Third Annual Writers’ Choice Award for Best CD in 2006 from Positive Feedback Online, and a second CD of the music of George Antheil for New World Records also received positive reviews from the world press. PVCO’s most recent recording features world premieres of several works by American composer Jeffrey Jacob.

=== Listening ===
- Art of the States: Philadelphia Virtuosi Chamber Orchestra
