= I Think I Like It =

Single by Fake Blood

from the album Fix Your Accent
- Released: 2009
- Genre: Plunderphonics, nu-disco, house
- Length: 5:35
- Label: Cheap Thrills Records, PIAS
- Songwriter(s): Fake Blood
- Producer(s): Fake Blood

Fake Blood singles chronology
"Mars" (2008)	"I Think I Like It" (2009)

Music video
- "I Think I Like It" on YouTube

"I Think I Like It" is the second single by British electronic musician Fake Blood and the first single from his EP Fix Your Accent.

== Composition ==
"I Think I Like It" samples the song "In the Heat of a Disco Night" by Arabesque and features lead vocals by Heike Rimbeau.

== Chart performance ==
"I Think I Like It" became Fake Blood's second single to chart on the Dutch Singles Chart. It peaked at No. 47 and spent a total of 9 weeks on the chart. It did not out peak his previous single "Mars", which had also peaked at No. 40. Despite this, "I Think I Like It" spent more weeks on the chart than "Mars", which had spent a total of 4 weeks on the Dutch Singles Chart. It debuted at No. 95 on the UK Singles Chart.

== Music video ==
Jo Apps directed the music video for "I Think I Like It". It is presented in a television shopping channel-style with two saleswomen advertising various mundane and/or useless products. The video ends with one of the women being given a 'makeover', only to find she now looks hideous. She fights with her co-saleswoman as the screen continues to show advertisements, before cutting to a technical difficulties image. The music video stars prominent UK beauty expert Melissa Hartzel.

== In popular culture ==
- The song was used in the 2015 American film We Are Your Friends, starring Zac Efron.

== Track listing ==
- Digital download
1. "I Think I Like It (Radio Edit)" – 2:48
2. "I Think I Like It" – 5:35

== Charts ==
=== Weekly charts ===
Chart (2009/2010)	Peak Position
Belgium (Ultratop 50 Flanders)	9
Belgium (Ultratip Wallonia)	3
Belgium Dance (Ultratop)	8
Netherlands (Single Top 100)	47
UK Singles (The Official Charts Company)	59
UK Dance (The Official Charts Company)	12
UK Indie (The Official Charts Company)	4
UK Indie Breakers (The Official Charts Company)	1

=== Year-end charts ===
Chart (2010)	Position
Belgium (Ultratop Flanders)	90
