= Ooh La La (The Wiseguys song) =

1998 single by the Wiseguys

- 1999 re-release artwork

Single by the Wiseguys

from the album The Antidote
- Released: 1998
- Genre: Big beat
- Length: 5:56
- Label: Wall of Sound
- Songwriter(s): Theo Keating
- Producer(s): Theo Keating

The Wiseguys singles chronology
"Casino 'Sans Pareil'" / "A Better World" (1997)	"Ooh La La" (1998)	"Start the Commotion" (1998)

"Ooh La La" is a song by English electronic music duo the Wiseguys from their second album, The Antidote (1998). First released as a single in 1998, it peaked at number 55 on the UK Singles Chart, but a re-release the following year proved highly successful after its inclusion in a Budweiser advertisement, this time reaching number two on the UK chart. The original release also reached number 87 in the Netherlands, while the re-release peaked at number seven in Iceland.

== Composition ==
The song has a BPM of 124. It samples "Jim on the Move" by Lalo Schifrin from his 1967 album Music from Mission: Impossible.

== Commercial performance ==
Initially, the song reached number 55 on the UK Singles Chart and also charted in the Netherlands at number 87. Upon its re-release on 24 May 1999, it re-entered the UK chart, going to number two. The song spent a total of 14 weeks on the chart. In Iceland, "Ooh La La" debuted and peaked at number seven in June 1999.

== Music video ==
The first video shows a Demolition Derby Event at the now closed Arena Essex Raceway.

A later produced music video was also released, set at an airport and featuring scantily-clad dancers.

== Charts ==
=== Weekly charts ===
Chart (1998)	Peak position
Netherlands (Single Top 100)	87
Scotland (OCC)	68
UK Singles (OCC)	55
UK Indie (OCC)	9

Chart (1999)	Peak position
Europe (Eurochart Hot 100)	14
Iceland (Íslenski Listinn Topp 40)	7
Scotland (OCC)	5
UK Singles (OCC)	2
UK Indie (OCC)	2

=== Year-end charts ===
Chart (1999)	Position
UK Singles (OCC)	75

== Certifications ==
Region	Certification	Certified units/sales
United Kingdom (BPI)	Silver	200,000^{^}
^{^} Shipments figures based on certification alone.

== Release history ==
Region	Date	Format(s)	Label(s)	Ref.
United Kingdom	1998	12-inch vinyl; CD	Wall of Sound	
United Kingdom	24 May 1999	12-inch vinyl; CD; cassette	Wall of Sound	
United States	17 August 1999	Alternative radio	Ideal; Mammoth	
