= Mary Ann Nagel =

- Birth name: Rita Nagel
- Also known as: Mary Ann
- Born: 1955 (age 69–70); West Germany
- Genres: Pop; disco; schlager
- Occupations: Singer
- Years active: 1960s-70s
- Labels: Intercord

Rita Nagel, known professionally as Mary Ann Nagel (born 1955) is a German singer. Nagel is notable for being the founding member of the Arabesque girl group in 1977.

== Life and career ==
Mary Ann Nagel was born as Rita Nagel in 1955. She took on the pseudonym of "Mary Ann" and began to sing from a very young age. She first released children's songs: So Viele Fragen / Laß mich nicht so lang allein" in 1968 and "Pony Girl / Du Ich Lieb' Dich Candy Man" in 1972. This was followed by schlager single "Schau Mich Nicht So Böse An / Ein Tag So Schön Wie Heut" in 1973. The singles did not make the German charts. Inspired by the recent success of the Silver Convention and other girl groups, Nagel and producers sought to create another girl group.

Arabesque was formed in 1977, and "Hello Mr. Monkey" was released as the first single featuring lead vocals by Nagel. Her participation in the group was short-lived however, she only recorded two songs with the group: disco songs "Hello Mr. Monkey / Buggy Boy". Mary Ann was part of Arabesque for a little over a year; she left in September 1978 and was replaced by Heike Rimbeau. Nagel's family life became more important than her career as a singer. She was married, had a son, and disliked the long commute from her hometown of Karlsruhe to Frankfurt am Main, where the group was based.
