= Eric Blakeney =

American screenwriter

- Born: Eric Blakeney; September 14, 1959 (age 67); The Bronx, New York, U.S.
- Years active: 1985–present

Eric Blakeney (born September 14, 1959) is an American film and television director, producer and screenwriter. He is known for writing award-winning episodes of television for 21 Jump Street, and writing and directing a feature film, 2000's Gun Shy.

== Biography ==
Blakeney was born in The Bronx, New York. He lived there until 1977, when he moved to London, England. After performing as a member of various London rock groups, Blakeney returned to the US, this time settling in Los Angeles, California. Blakeney wrote for various print publications, until he found his calling - and his first writing job - in television on Crime Story.

Based on the strength of his work on Crime Story and Moonlighting, Blakeney was hired as a story editor on Wiseguy, until becoming a senior writer. During this time, he was also nominated for an Edgar Award for his work on Wiseguy - specifically, the episode "The Marriage of Heaven and Hell". He later became the show runner for 21 Jump Street, starring Johnny Depp, and later created the spin-off series Booker, starring Richard Grieco.

After working in television, Blakeney wrote and directed his first film - Gun Shy, starring Liam Neeson and Sandra Bullock.
