= Flux (Alison Goldfrapp album) =

Studio album by Alison Goldfrapp
- Released: 15 August 2025
- Genre: Electropop
- Length: 37:17
- Label: A.G.
- Producer: James Greenwood; Alison Goldfrapp; Stefan Storm; Richard X

Alison Goldfrapp chronology
The Love Invention (2023)	Flux (2025)

Singles from Flux
- 1. "Find Xanadu" Released: 30 April 2025; 2. "Reverberotic" Released: 21 May 2025; 3. "Sound & Light" Released: 13 June 2025; 4. "Hey Hi Hello" Released: 4 July 2025

Professional ratings
Aggregate scores
Source	Rating
Metacritic	70/100
Review scores
Source	Rating
AllMusic	4/5 stars
The Arts Desk	3/5 stars
The Independent	3/5 stars
The Line of Best Fit	8/10
Mojo	3/5 stars
musicOMH	3.5/5 stars
Pitchfork	7.2/10
Record Collector	4/5 stars
The Skinny	3/5 stars
The Times	3/5 stars
Uncut	6/10

Flux is the second solo album by British singer and musician Alison Goldfrapp, released on 15 August 2025, under her own record label A.G. Records. It marked her first album in over two years since The Love Invention (2023). It was first announced with the release of the lead single "Find Xanadu" on 30 April 2025.

== Background and promotion ==
"Find Xanadu" was released as the album official lead single on 30 April 2025, alongside its music video. At the same time the album pre-save with its release date, cover, and track list was revealed. The second single, "Reverberotic", was released on 21 May 2025. "Sound & Light" was released on 13 June as the album's third single. "Hey Hi Hello" was released as the album's fourth single on 4 July.

== Track listing ==
Flux track listing
No.	Title	Writer(s)	Producer(s)	Length
1.	"Hey Hi Hello"	Alison Goldfrapp; Stefan Storm; Joel Sjöö	Stefan Storm; Richard X	3:09
2.	"Sound & Light"	Goldfrapp; Storm	Goldfrapp; Storm; Lazy Weekends^{[a]}	3:18
3.	"Reverberotic"	Goldfrapp; Storm	Goldfrapp; Storm; Lazy Weekends^{[a]}	4:18
4.	"Strange Things Happen"	Goldfrapp; Richard X	Goldfrapp; Richard X	4:44
5.	"UltraSky"	Goldfrapp; Storm; Richard X	Goldfrapp; Storm; Richard X	4:07
6.	"Play It (Shine Like a Nova Star)"	Goldfrapp; James Greenwood	Goldfrapp; Greenwood; Richard X	2:54
7.	"Find Xanadu"	Goldfrapp; Storm	Goldfrapp; Storm; Richard X^{[a]}	3:09
8.	"Cinnamon Light"	Goldfrapp; Richard X	Goldfrapp; Richard X	3:45
9.	"Ordinary Day"	Goldfrapp; Richard X	Goldfrapp; Richard X	3:52
10.	"Magma"	Goldfrapp; Storm	Goldfrapp; Storm	4:01

Flux (Lux Deluxe Edition) bonus tracks
No.	Title	Length
11.	"Perfect Lies"	4:39
12.	"Summer Sends the Rain (Ordinary Day Pt. 2)"	5:42
13.	"UltraSky" (Acoustic)	3:17
14.	"Strange Things Happen" (Taste It Mix)	5:31
15.	"Cinnamon Light" (Desert Fire Mix)	6:25
16.	"Find Xanadu" (Röyksopp Remix)	4:07

=== Note ===
- ^{^[a]} indicates an additional producer

== Personnel ==
Credits adapted from the album's liner notes and Tidal.

- Alison Goldfrapp – vocals, creative direction
- Pete Hofmann – mixing
- Dick Beetham – mastering
- Stefan Storm – keyboards (tracks 1–3, 5, 7, 10)
- Richard X – keyboards (1, 3–9)
- Davide Rossi – cello, viola, violin, string arrangements (2–5, 7–9)
- Martin Vogel – acid bassline (2)
- Sebastian Sternberg – live drums (3)
- James Greenwood – keyboards (6)
- Anders Stenberg – guitars (10)
- Mat Maitland – creative direction, image, design
- Yana McKillop – styling

== Charts ==
Chart performance for Flux
Chart (2025)	Peak position
Scottish Albums (OCC)	5
Swiss Albums (Schweizer Hitparade)	59
UK Albums (OCC)	13
UK Independent Albums (OCC)	2
UK Dance Albums (OCC)	1

== Release history ==
Region	Date	Format	Label	Ref.
Various	15 August 2025	CD; cassette; vinyl; digital download; streaming	A. G. Records	
