= Pop (TV series) =

German television show

Pop is a pop music program that aired in West Germany from 1974 to 1979. Each year, the show's title was changed to reflect that of the current year, e.g. Pop '76. It was originally broadcast on the SWF and HR networks. Pop was meant to rival fellow ZDF music shows Disco and Starparade, albeit catering to a younger audience. The show was hosted by Hans Jürgen Kliebenstein from its launch in 1974 until 1978. Afterward, in 1979, Volker Lechtenbrink took over as the show's host.

Several artists, both German and international stars, appeared and performed on the show. Domestic artists from Germany such as the Silver Convention, Arabesque, Boney M., and Donna Summer appeared on the show. International artists such as The Police, Shirley and Co., Middle of the Road, and Jigsaw also made regular appearances.

In 2017, reruns of the show began to air for the first time on One, an ARD network.

== Episodes broadcast on ARD ==
ARD broadcast date	Episode	Guest
11.03.1974	01	Rubettes, Malcolm Roberts, Andy Kim, Stefan Waggershausen, Eckart Kahlhofer, Donna Hightower, First Class, Don Paulin, Middle Of The Road
11.13.1974	02	
12.01.1974	03	Blue Swede, The Three Degrees, Udo Jürgens, Randy Pie, Frank Zander, Suzanne Doucet, Reinhard Mey
03.02.1975	04	Kin Ping Meh, Billy Swan, Nazareth, Donna Summer, Joy Fleming
04.20.1975	05	Peter Maffay, Lynsey de Paul
06.08.1975	06	Bay City Rollers, Chris de Burgh, Shirley & Company, Jigsaw, Dagmar Berghoff, Peter Horton
09.27.1975	07	Up with People, Gerard Lenorman, Red Hurley, The Glitter Band, Martin Griffiths, Bill Ramsey
10.19.1975	08	Inga Rumpf, Harpo
11.30.1975	09	The Tymes, Linda Carr, La Costa, Maxine Nightingale, Jigsaw, Rubettes, Brotherhood of Man
12.21.1975	10	Pilot, Electric Light Orchestra, Jim Capaldi, Vivi Bach, Elkie Brooks, Albert Hammond
02.15.1976	11	Linda G. Thompson, Penny McLean, Tony Sheridan, Chris Spedding, Eddie Foster
03.14.1976	12	Claudja Barry, Demis Roussos, Smokie, Tina Charles, Tony Marshall, Sheer Elegance, Jürgen Marcus
04.25.1976	13	
05.27.1976	14	
10.10.1976	15	Johnny Wakelin, Jeane Manson, Liverpool Express, Jesse Green, Geff Harrison, Julien Clerc, 5000 Volts
10.31.1976	16	Silver Convention, Hugo Egon Balder, Rubettes
12.12.1976	17	Simon May, Claudja Barry, Hanne Haller, Smokie, Sebastião Tapajós
10.16.1977		Arabesque
12.06.1978		Volker Lechtenbrink, Udo Lindenberg, Nina Hagen
02.18.1979		Boney M., Gerard Lenorman, Whitesnake, Wolfgang Ambros, Elke Heidenreich, Chris Howland
