= We Are Your Friends (Simian album) =

Studio album by Simian
- Released: 28 October 2002
- Length: 40:39
- Label: Source; Astralwerks; Mawlaw 388
- Producer: Simian

Simian chronology
Chemistry Is What We Are (2001)	We Are Your Friends (2002)

Singles from We Are Your Friends
- 1. "Never Be Alone" Released: 21 October 2002; 2. "La Breeze" Released: 31 March 2003; 3. "In Between" Released: 15 September 2003

Professional ratings
Review scores
Source	Rating
Pitchfork	7.1/10

We Are Your Friends is the second album by the English rock band Simian. It was released on 28 October 2002 on Mawlaw 388 in the UK and on 29 October 2002 on Astralwerks.

The title of the album comes from the lyrics of one of its songs, "Never be Alone". This song would later be made famous by Justice when they released a remix by the same name of the album, "We Are Your Friends", which was credited to 'Justice vs. Simian'.

== Track listing ==
1. "La Breeze" – 2:56
2. "Sunshine" – 3:15
3. "Never Be Alone" – 3:22
4. "Helpless" – 3:29
5. "Skin" – 3:01
6. "Big Black Gun" – 3:15
7. "In Between" – 3:11
8. "The Way I Live" – 3:19
9. "The Swarm" – 3:39
10. "When I Go" – 3:10
11. "She's In Mind" – 3:50
12. "End Of The Day" – 4:09

== Personnel ==
=== Simian ===
- Simon William Lord – vocals, guitar, keyboards, drum programming
- Alex MacNaghten – bass, backing vocals
- James Anthony Shaw – keyboards, drum programming, percussion
- James Ford – drums, drum programming, percussion

=== Other personnel ===
- Mat Maitland – design, art direction
- Kate Gibb – artwork (silkscreens)
- Peter Edwards – photography
- Donald Milne – photography
