= Hello Mr. Monkey =

Single by Arabesque

from the album Friday Night
- B-side: "Buggy Boy"
- Released: 25 October 1977
- Genre: Pop, Europop, disco
- Length: 3:27
- Label: EMI (Germany); Victor (Japan); Papillon Records (Netherlands)
- Songwriter(s): Ben Juris; Benny Lux
- Producer(s): Wolfgang Mewes

Arabesque singles chronology
"Hello Mr. Monkey" (1977)	"Friday Night" (1978)

"Hello Mr. Monkey" is the debut single by German all-girl trio, Arabesque. Initially released only in Germany in 1977, it was released worldwide the following year in 1978.

== Track listing ==
1. A. "Hello Mr. Monkey" - 3:27
2. B. "Buggy Boy" - 2:55

== Background ==
Written in 1977 shortly before the Arabesque lineup was finalized, "Hello Mr. Monkey" was the debut single of the West German group. The song is about a performer "Mr. Monkey" who was once famous, but has now lost his fame and "should've been a clown". It features Mary Ann Nagel on lead vocals, with Karen Ann Tepperis and Michaela Rose as backup singers. The song was a huge hit in Asia, particularly Japan and South Korea, spending weeks at number one. However, it failed to chart in Germany and other European countries. Arabesque gave their first ever public appearance on October 16, 1977, performing the song on the German Pop '77 program on ARD.

== Samples and covers ==
- Pink Lady performed the song for their 1978 live album '78 Jumping Summer Carnival. It was released as the B-side of their 1979 single "Pink Typhoon (In the Navy)".
- Denki Groove sampled the song for "Hello! Mr. Monkey Magic Orchestra", the final track from the 2000 album Voxxx.
