= Pink Typhoon =

"Pink Typhoon (In the Navy)"

Single by Pink Lady

from the album UFO/Southpaw
- Language: Japanese
- B-side: "Hello Mr. Monkey (Live)"
- Released: May 1, 1979
- Genre: J-pop; disco
- Length: 4:10
- Label: Victor
- Composers: Jacques Morali; Henri Belolo; Victor Willis
- Lyricist: Tomoko Okada
- Producer: Hisahiko Iida

Pink Lady singles chronology
"Zipangu" (1979)	"Pink Typhoon (In the Navy)" (1979)	"Nami Nori Pirates" (1979)

"Pink Typhoon (In the Navy)" is Pink Lady's twelfth single, released in May 1979. It peaked at number six on the Oricon charts and number five on the Japanese Music Labo chart. It was the duo's first single to not be written by Shunichi Tokura and Yū Aku.

The song is a cover of the Village People's "In the Navy", but with rewritten Japanese lyrics that have nothing to do with the original content of the song. In the song's chorus the lines "In the navy" have been replaced with "Pink Lady", and "They want you as a new recruit" with "I want you, you want Mie/I want you, you want Kei" (referring to group members Mie and Kei). The same year, singer Teppei Shibuya released his cover version of "In the Navy" as "Young Sailor Man (In The Navy)" in his cover album of the same name.

According to Billboard, the original and Pink Lady cover versions were pitted against each other by record company Victor.

The song was also featured on the Japanese music show The Best Ten, where it peaked at No. 6.

The single sold approximately 700,000 copies.

== Track listing (7" vinyl) ==
No.	Title	Lyrics	Music	Arrangement	Length
1.	"Pink Typhoon (In the Navy)"	Tomoko Okada	Jacques Morali; Henri Belolo; Victor Willis	Kazufumi Ōhama	4:10
2.	"Hello Mr. Monkey (Live)"	Ben Jurris; Benny Lux	Jurris; Lux	Norio Maeda

== Chart positions ==
Chart (1979)	Peak position
Japanese Oricon Singles Chart	6
Japanese Music Labo Chart	5

== See also ==
- 1979 in Japanese music
