= Mars (song) =

Single by Fake Blood
- Released: November 2008
- Genre: Electronic, fidget house
- Label: Cheap Thrills Records, PIAS
- Songwriter: Fake Blood
- Producer: Fake Blood

Fake Blood singles chronology
"Mars" (2008)	"I Think I Like It" (2009)

"Mars" is the debut single by English electronic musician Fake Blood.

== Critical reception ==
Mother Jones ranked "Mars" at #5 on "The Best Singles of 2008" list.

== Chart performance ==
"Mars" became Fake Blood's first single to chart on the Belgian Dance Chart. It peaked at No. 3 and spent a total of 23 weeks on the chart. The single also became Fake Blood's first single on the Dutch Singles Chart, where it peaked at No. 40 and spent a total of 4 weeks on the chart. It received a lot of airplay on the Dutch radio station 3FM.

== Track listing ==
- Mars single
1. "Mars (Radio Edit)" – 2:59
2. "Mars" – 4:23
3. "Blood Splashing (Fake Blood Theme)" – 4:25
- Mars - Remixes
1. "Mars (Jack Beats Remix)" – 5:25
2. "Mars (Style of Eye's Edit to Debit)" – 8:40
3. "Mars (Boy 8 Bit Remix)" – 5:55

== Charts ==
Chart (2008/2009)	Peak Position
Belgian Tip Chart (Flanders)	2
Belgian Dance Chart	3
Dutch Singles Chart	40
UK Indie Singles Chart	16
