= Start the Commotion =

Single by The Wiseguys

from the album The Antidote
- Released: 1998
- Genre: Big beat
- Length: 5:57
- Label: Wall of Sound; Mammoth (United States/Canada)
- Songwriter: Theo Keating
- Producer: Touché

The Wiseguys singles chronology
"Ooh La La" (1998)	"Start the Commotion" (1998)	"Dizzy Spell" (2002)

"Start the Commotion" is a song by British electronic music duo The Wiseguys, from their second album The Antidote. It was released as a single in the UK in 1998, and peaked at #66 on the UK Singles Chart. A re-release the following year gave the song a higher chart placing, peaking at #47. It also peaked at #36 on the US dance charts in 2000. "Start the Commotion" has also been officially remixed by Eric Kupper and DJ Spinna.

== Background ==
The song is built around a repeated sample from the 1966 song "Wild Child" by The Ventures.

== Track listing ==
UK CD single

1. "Start the Commotion" (Radio edit)
2. "Fatal Femme" (feat. Sense Live)
3. "Start the Commotion" (Full length)

== 2001 re-release ==
After being used in a Mitsubishi Motors television commercial in the US in 2001, the song gained a second life and significant radio airplay, reaching the top 40 on the Billboard Hot 100 and making it the Wiseguys' best-known song in the US. It appeared on Now That's What I Call Music! 8 released November 20, 2001.

== Charts ==
Chart (1998–2001)	Peak position
Canada CHR (Nielsen BDS)	15
UK Singles Chart	47
U.S. Billboard Dance Music/Club Play Singles	36
US Billboard Hot 100	31
US Adult Pop Airplay (Billboard)	14
US Pop Airplay (Billboard)	11

== Other uses in popular culture ==
- It was featured in the 2001 comedy Zoolander, where it was used to promote the film.
- It was also featured in the films Gun Shy (2000) and Kangaroo Jack (2003). It was also featured on the Lizzie McGuire soundtrack.
- It was also featured in the 4,000th episode special of the syndicated game show Jeopardy!.
