= Fix Your Accent =

EP by Fake Blood
- Released: 2009
- Genre: Electronic, house
- Label: Cheap Thrills
- Producer: Fake Blood

Singles from Fix Your Accent
- 1. "I Think I Like It" Released: 2009

Fix Your Accent is the debut EP by British DJ and musician Fake Blood. It contains the hit single "I Think I Like It".

== Track listing ==
No.	Title	Writer(s)	Length
1.	"Fix Your Accent"	Fake Blood	5:06
2.	"The Dozens"	Fake Blood	5:06
3.	"I Think I Like It"	Fake Blood	5:37

== Charts ==
Chart (2009)	Peak Position
Belgium Dance (Ultratop)	1
UK Indie Breakers (The Official Charts Company)	19
