= The Black Ghosts =

English electronic music duo

- Origin: England
- Genres: Electro
- Years active: 2006–present
- Labels: Southern Fried Records (UK), IAMSOUND Records (U.S.)
- Members: Theo Keating; Simon Lord

The Black Ghosts are an English electronic music duo composed of Theo Keating and Simon William Lord, formed in 2006. They are currently signed to Southern Fried Records in the UK and IAMSOUND Records in North America. Keating and Lord had previously been in the bands the Wiseguys and Simian, respectively. Keating is well known for his other recording synonyms Touche and Fake Blood.

== History ==
Keating and Lord discovered each other through the internet and had only physically met after they had worked on a significant amount of material together. The Black Ghosts' style was described as being "perverse, personal pop music", a tendency that has its roots in both Keating and Lord's early childhood. Keating was encouraged by his mother to watch horror movies at a young age; Lord's grandmother was considered psychic.

The Black Ghosts released a series of singles followed by the DJ mix titled Mixtape and the well-received EP Anyway You Choose to Give It. Their self-titled debut album was released on 8 July 2008. The lead single "Repetition Kills You" features Damon Albarn as guest vocalist. The song "I Want Nothing" was featured on the Triple J Hit List. Each track from the album was to be accompanied by a music video. The song "Full Moon" is featured in the 2008 film Twilight and its accompanying soundtrack album.

In March 2008, Lord performed a three-song live video set for LiveDaily Sessions during the South by Southwest music festival in Austin, Texas. The set included the songs "Some Way Though This", "Anyway You Choose to Give It" and "Something New", which premiered on 14 August 2008.

In March 2011, Annie Mac played a new song called "Water Will Find a Way" courtesy of Lord, announcing a new album released in June of the same year. The album was given the name When Animals Stare.

== Discography ==
=== Albums ===
- Mixtape (DJ mix) (2008)
- The Black Ghosts (2008)
- When Animals Stare (2011)
- When Animals Stare (Acoustic Versions) (2011)

=== Singles ===
- "Face" (2006)
- "Anyway You Choose to Give It" (2007)
- "It's Your Touch" (2007)
- "Some Way Through This" (2007)
- "Repetition Kills You" (2007)
- "I Want Nothing" (2008)
- "Something New" (2008)
- "Full Moon" (2009)
- "Water Will Find a Way" (2011)
- "Forgetfulness" (2013)
- "Take Me To Neverland" (2026)
