= Chemistry Is What We Are =

Studio album by Simian
- Released: 9 July 2001
- Genre: Trip hop; downtempo; alternative pop
- Length: 43:28
- Label: Source; Astralwerks

Simian chronology
Watch It Glow (2000)	Chemistry Is What We Are (2001)	We Are Your Friends (2002)

Singles from Chemistry Is What We Are
- 1. "The Wisp" Released: 21 May 2001; 2. "One Dimension" Released: 22 October 2001; 3. "Mr. Crow" Released: 4 February 2002

Professional ratings
Review scores
Source	Rating
Pitchfork	7.7/10

Chemistry Is What We Are is the debut album by the English rock band Simian. It was released on 9 July 2001 on Source Records in the UK and on 18 September 2001 on Astralwerks (with two bonus tracks) in the US.

== Track listing ==
1. "Drop and Roll" – 6:25
2. "The Wisp" – 4:15
3. "Doba" – 5:14
4. "You Set Off My Brain" – 4:21
5. "How Could I Be Right" – 1:42
6. "One Dimension" – 4:48
7. "Tree in a Corner" – 2:11
8. "Orange Glow" – 3:44
9. "Mr. Crow" – 2:48
10. "Round and Around" – 4:12
11. "Chamber" – 3:49
12. "The Tale of Willow Hill" – 3:37 (US bonus track)
13. "Grey" – 3:57 (US bonus track)

== Personnel ==
=== Simian ===
- Simon William Lord – vocals, electric/acoustic guitar, keyboards, drum programming
- Alex MacNaghten – bass, backing vocals
- James Anthony Shaw – keyboards, drum programming, percussion
- James Ford – drums, drum programming

=== Other personnel ===
- Nilesh Patel – mastering
- Mat Maitland – design, art direction
- Thomas Grünfeld – artwork
- Jason Evans – photography
