= Modern Anxiety =

modern anxiety

Studio album by Josef Salvat
- Released: 15 May 2020
- Length: 33:19
- Label: Sony; Liberation
- Producer: Rich Cooper; Jacob Manson; Banx & Ranx; Martin Craft

Josef Salvat chronology
Night Swim (2016)	modern anxiety (2020)	Islands (2022)

Singles from Modern Anxiety
- 1. "Modern Anxiety" Released: 13 November 2019; 2. "In the Afternoon" Released: 16 January 2020; 3. "Paper Moons" Released: 20 March 2020

Professional ratings
Aggregate scores
Source	Rating
Metacritic	75/100
Review scores
Source	Rating
AllMusic	3.5/5 stars
Clash	8/10
DIY	4/5 stars
MusicOMH	3.5/5 stars

Modern Anxiety (stylized in all lowercase) is the second studio album by Australian singer and songwriter Josef Salvat. It was released on 15 May 2020 through Sony Music, succeeding his 2016 debut album Night Swim.

== Background ==
Upon the release of the album's lead and title cut "Modern Anxiety", Salvat described roughly what his audience could expect from the album sonically in an interview with Gay Times, saying "It's coming next year, I'm just doing final touches on that. And sonically it is a mixed bag, as was my first one, I think. And I think that's what I'm interested in. Thematically it deals with a lot of issues that I found really funny, and I tried to do it in a light way, because that was the only way I could do it. If I was too happy about all of it, not even when writing, but when I was thinking about it, I'd get stuck in this maze. But by trying to be light, and graceful in the way I dealt with stuff, and with compassion for myself and for other people which I've lacked in the past, but I feel like I have a lot more of that now. That's kind of what's gone into the writing process. And sonically I've been restrained. This whole album is open. I felt like I lived in a prison of my own making for eight years. I feel with the first album, I was so proud of that, but I feel this whole album is about connecting with people."

The artwork for the album, created by Mat Maitland, was revealed on 6 February 2020.

== Singles ==
The album's lead single and title cut "Modern Anxiety" was released on 13 November 2019 with a music video directed by Salvat himself, alongside Meg O'Connell. The second single "In the Afternoon" succeeded on 16 January 2020 with a music video directed my Andrea Mae Perez.

=== Promotional singles ===
The singles "Alone" and "Playground Love" were both released as promotional singles and b-sides to "Modern Anxiety" and "In the Afternoon" respectively.

== Track listing ==
No.	Title	Writer(s)	Producer(s)	Length
1.	"modern anxiety"	Josef Salvat	Salvat; Rich Cooper; Jacob Manson^{[a]}; Banx & Ranx^{[a]}	3:03
2.	"call on me"	Salvat; Rachel Furner; Joakim Jarl	Salvat; Jarly	3:00
3.	"in the afternoon"	Salvat; Martin Craft	Salvat; Cooper; Craft^{[a]}	3:18
4.	"alone"	Salvat; Jacob Manson	Salvat; Cooper; Manson	3:15
5.	"playground love"	Salvat; Richard Cooper; Carrie Haber; Rotana Tarabzouni	Salvat; Cooper	2:57
6.	"melt"	Salvat	Salvat; Cooper	3:58
7.	"no vacancies"	Salvat; Liam O'Donnell; Klas Ahlund	Salvat; Cooper; Ahlund	3:45
8.	"paper moons"	Salvat; Manson	Salvat; Cooper; Manson	3:27
9.	"human"	Salvat; Justin Parker	Salvat; Cooper; Parker	3:24
10.	"enough"	Salvat; David Spinelli	Salvat; Spinelli; Cooper^{[c]}	3:12
Total length:				33:19

Notes

- All tracks are stylized in all lowercase letters.

== See also ==
- List of 2020 albums
