= Simian (band) =

English rock band

- Simian (2002)

Background information
- Origin: Manchester, England
- Genres: Psychedelic pop; electronic; synth-pop; electronic rock; trip hop
- Years active: 2000–2005
- Label: Source UK
- Spinoffs: Simian Mobile Disco
- Past members: Simon Lord; Alex MacNaghten; James Shaw; James Ford

Simian were an English rock band, formed in Manchester in 2000.

== Members ==
- Simon William Lord (vocals, lead guitar, drum programming)
- Alex MacNaghten (bass)
- James Anthony Shaw (keyboards, drum programming, percussion)
- James Ellis Ford (drums, drum programming)

=== Touring members ===
- Michael Tighe - additional guitar, keyboards, percussion (2003)

== History ==
Simian were formed while members of the band were studying at Manchester University. MacNaghten, Shaw and Ford were formerly members of live breakbeat project King Rib, alongside MC Mr. Wrong and DJ Silver.

=== Main releases ===
Their debut album Chemistry Is What We Are was first released in the UK on 9 July 2001 on Source Records and in the US on 18 September 2001 on Astralwerks. The US edition contained two bonus tracks, "The Tale of Willow Hill" and "Grey", that had previously been released in the UK as part of The Wisp and Watch It Glow EPs respectively.

Their second album, We Are Your Friends was released in the UK on 28 October 2002 (on Source Records) and in the US on 29 October 2002 (on Astralwerks). The Japanese release (26 March 2003) also included the bonus tracks, "Out of Bed", "Coins" and "Reasons", the first two of which had previously been released in the UK as B-sides of the "Never Be Alone" single.

=== Other work ===
In 2000, the band recorded a cover version of the Prince song "Under the Cherry Moon" from his album Parade (1986). This song was released on the tribute album, If I Was Prince (2001).

The band remixed various tracks by other artists, including "Playgirl" by Ladytron, "AM/PM" by Appliance, "Destiny" by Zero 7, and "Papua New Guinea" by The Future Sound of London.

In 2005, their song "La Breeze" was featured in a Peugeot 1007 television advertisement. It was also used in the 2007 Dove advertisement "Onslaught".

=== Split ===
The band split up in 2005 with Ford and Shaw forming the spin-off group Simian Mobile Disco. The new group is more dance-oriented and are in demand as remixers and DJs. Ford is also in the baroque pop group The Last Shadow Puppets with Arctic Monkeys singer Alex Turner. Lord is now in The Black Ghosts, an electronica act with DJ Touche from The Wiseguys.

=== Justice remix ===
In 2006, the single "We Are Your Friends", which is a remix of their song "Never Be Alone", was released on a reactivated Virgin Records subsidiary label called Ten Records. This single was credited to "Justice vs Simian", and started life as a submission by the French music group Justice in a remix competition. The video for the single won the award for best video at the 2006 MTV Europe Music Awards. At the awards ceremony, fellow nominee Kanye West appeared on stage to complain about the Justice vs Simian victory.

"Illmerica" (by Wolfgang Gartner) was, in turn, mashed up with "We Are Your Friends" to form the track "Illmerica Are Your Friends" by Australian DJ Steve Camp; the song became popular after it was played as the opening track on episode 186 of Tiësto's radio show Club Life in 2010.

In 2011, NME placed "We Are Your Friends" at number 19 on its list "150 Best Tracks of the Past 15 Years".

== Discography ==
=== Albums ===
- Chemistry Is What We Are (2001)
- We Are Your Friends (2002)

=== Singles and EPs ===
The following releases were in the UK only on Source Records:

- Watch It Glow (EP, 16 October 2000)
- The Wisp (EP, 21 May 2001)
- "One Dimension" (22 October 2001) - UK #95
- "Mr. Crow" (4 February 2002) - UK #84
- "Never Be Alone" (21 October 2002) - UK #76
- "La Breeze" (31 March 2003) - UK #55
- "In Between" (15 September 2003)
- "We Are Your Friends" - Justice vs Simian (2006) - UK #20
