= Danny and Alex =

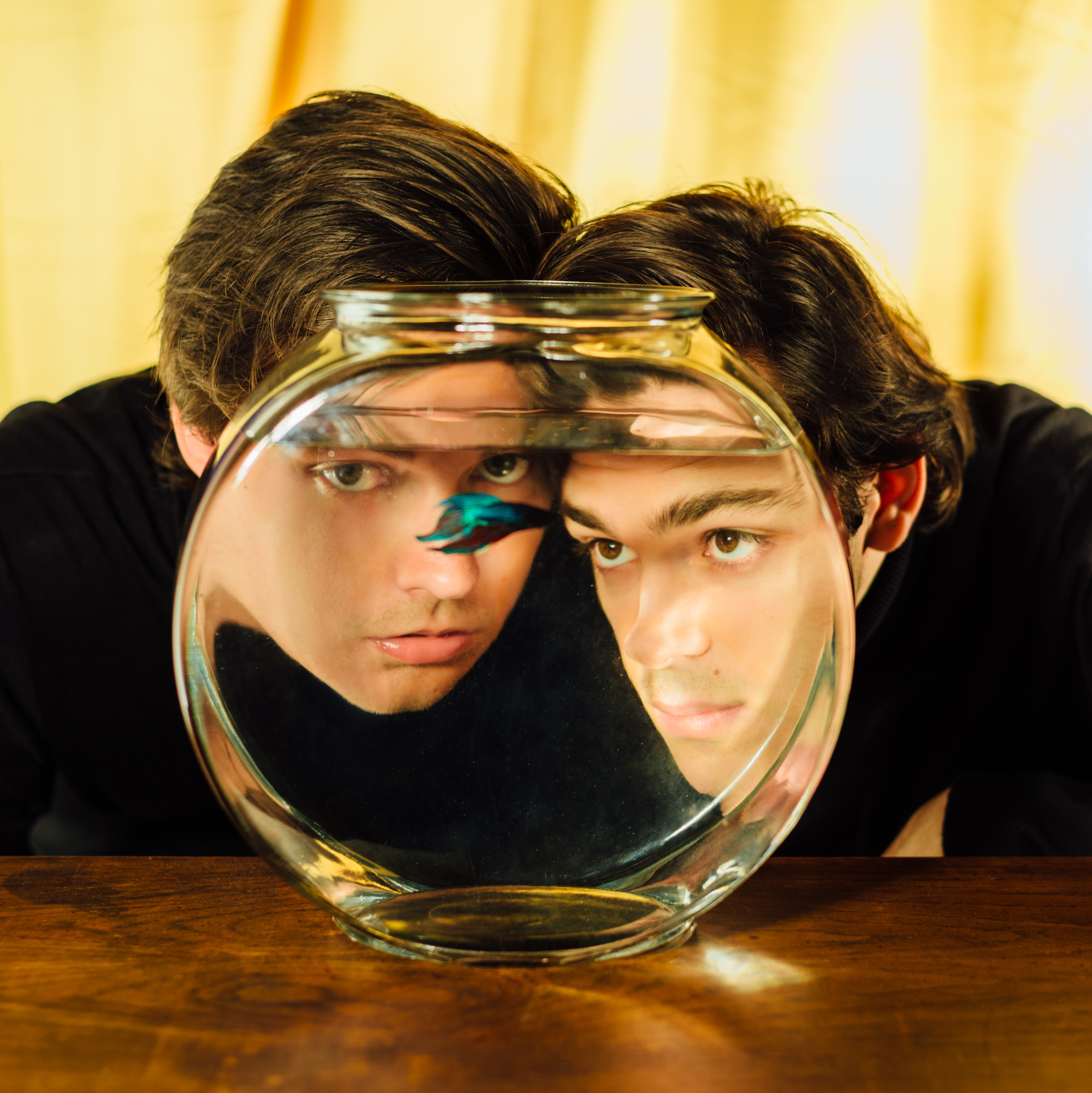
- Danny and Alex in 2019

Background information
- Born: St. Petersburg, Florida, U.S.
- Genres: Pop; Funk
- Occupation(s): Singer-songwriter, record producer
- Years active: 2008–present
- Website: dannynalex.com

Danny and Alex is an American pop duo. Danny Scordato and Alex Merrill write, produce, and engineer their own music. They have released one EP and seven singles.

Both Scordato and Merrill are from St. Petersburg, Florida. Both of their parents were musicians and they are largely self taught. While in high school, they began working as session musicians in recording studios around Florida. Between 2009 and 2016, they recorded piano, bass, guitar, drums and vocals on dozens of albums for independent artists, as well as toured nationally as the band for Macy Kate. Through their first band, "Sound Parlor", they have performed with Rick Derringer, Jeff Skunk Baxter, Barry Goudreau, and opened for Marty Balin, Austin Mahone, Cheap Trick and Sly Stone. They have stated their influences to include: Steely Dan, The Beatles, Prince, and Harry Nilsson. Their songwriting style is known to include humorous themes and lyrics, overtop funk pop instrumentations. Creative Loafing referred to their style as: “A mix of Chromeo’s white boy strut, Pharrell’s mainstream groove appeal and his own most adorable quasi-serious soul.”

== Recent ==
In 2015, they released a music video for the Sound Parlor single “Can He Sing Like Me” which was mixed by Grammy winner, Dave Pensado.

In 2016, Danny and Alex's work as producers was featured on the popular Web Series, "Pensado’s Place."

In April 2017, drummer Questlove posted a video he filmed of Danny and Alex performing Madhouse "8" at The Social in Orlando, Florida.

in February 2020, Danny and Alex toured the east coast of the United States. Shows included Miami, Orlando, Atlanta, Nashville, New York, and Philadelphia.

== Production ==
Danny and Alex record using Propellerhead's Reason software. They write, engineer, produce, perform, mix, and master all of their music at their studio in St. Petersburg, Florida.

== Discography ==
=== EPs ===
- Grand Slam, Thank You Ma'am (2018)

=== Singles ===
- "Breakup Haircut" (2018)
- "Shower in the Dark" (2019)
- "Friends Kiss Too" (2019)
- "NC17" (2019)
- "Older Boy Effect" (2019)
- "Hey Hi Hello" (2020)
- "Man With A Minivan" (2020)
- "Thunder Of My Heart" (2023)
