= Night Swim (album) =

2015 studio album by Josef Salvat

Studio album by Josef Salvat
- Released: 23 October 2015
- Recorded: 2013–2015
- Studio: Snap (London); British Grove (London); The Bridge (Bermondsey, London); Studio 21 (London); The Square; Sarm Studios (London)
- Genre: Pop; electropop
- Length: 52:56
- Label: Columbia
- Producer: Rich Cooper; Ben Mclusky; Will Purton; Josef Salvat

Josef Salvat chronology
In Your Prime (2014)	Night Swim (2015)	Modern Anxiety (2020)

Alternative cover
- French standard edition artwork

Night Swim (stylized in all lowercase) is the debut studio album by Australian singer-songwriter Josef Salvat. It was first released in France on 23 October 2015 by Columbia Records. An enhanced worldwide edition of the album was released on 19 February 2016.

== Critical reception ==
Professional ratings
Review scores
Source	Rating
Clash	7/10
The Irish Times	3/5 stars
The Guardian	4/5 stars

Night Swim received generally positive reviews from music critics. Lisa Henderson of Clash wrote that "throughout the album, there's a penchant for linear melodies and production that bubbles beneath the surface, which allows Salvat's compelling story telling to take center stage. But it's when that production surges upward, prompting the singer's melodies to take flight that you realize this was his intention all along; Josef Salvat's masterstroke is conjuring moments of chaos from complete calm, and the results are majestic." She added that Night Swim "may not be instant or immediately accessible but given repeat spins it reveals itself as a thrillingly original and utterly gripping LP." The Irish Times writer Lauren Murphy gave the album three out of five stars while adding that Salvat was "still figuring his own sound out".

== Track listing ==
All tracks written by Josef Salvat except where noted.

French standard edition
No.	Title	Producer(s)	Length
1.	"Open Season (Une autre saison)"	Rich Cooper; Ben Mclusky^{[a]}; Salvat^{[b]}	4:03
2.	"Hustler"	Cooper; Salvat^{[b]}	3:54
3.	"Punchline"	Cooper	5:01
4.	"Till I Found You"	Cooper	4:08
5.	"Constant Runners"	Cooper	3:44
6.	"Night Swim"	Cooper	5:05
7.	"Closer"	Cooper; Mclusky^{[a]}	3:10
8.	"Shoot and Run"	Cooper; Mclusky^{[a]}	4:23
9.	"The Days"	Cooper; Mclusky^{[a]}	3:44
10.	"Paradise (Le paradis nous trouvera)"	Cooper; Mclusky^{[a]}	3:48
11.	"A Better Word"	Cooper; Will Purton^{[a]}	3:41
12.	"Diamonds" (Benjamin Levin, Mikkel S. Eriksen, Sia Furler, Tor Erik Hermansen)	Cooper; Salvat^{[b]}	4:07
13.	"Week-end à Rome" (Étienne Daho)	Cooper	4:08
Total length:			52:56

Worldwide standard edition
No.	Title	Producer(s)	Length
1.	"Open Season"	Cooper; Mclusky^{[a]}; Salvat^{[b]}	4:02
2.	"Paradise"	Cooper; Mclusky^{[a]}	3:27
3.	"Hustler"	Cooper; Salvat^{[b]}	3:54
4.	"Punchline"	Cooper	5:01
5.	"Closer"	Cooper; Mclusky^{[a]}	3:09
6.	"Till I Found You"	Cooper	4:07
7.	"Shoot and Run"	Cooper; Mclusky^{[a]}	4:23
8.	"Constant Runners"	Cooper	3:44
9.	"Night Swim"	Cooper	5:04
10.	"The Days"	Cooper; Mclusky^{[a]}	3:40
11.	"Every Night"	Cooper; Salvat^{[b]}	3:43
12.	"A Better Word"	Cooper; Purton^{[a]}	3:49
Total length:			48:03

Worldwide deluxe edition
No.	Title	Producer(s)	Length
13.	"Secret"	Cooper	3:30
14.	"This Life"	Cooper; Salvat^{[b]}	3:43
15.	"Diamonds" (Levin, Eriksen, Furler, Hermansen)	Cooper; Salvat^{[b]}	4:05
16.	"In the Audience"	Cooper	4:03
Total length:			63:24

Notes

- ^{^[a]} signifies a co-producer
- ^{^[b]} signifies an additional producer

== Personnel ==
- Josef Salvat – vocals, songwriting, additional production
- Rich Cooper – production
- Ben Mclusky – co-production
- Will Purton – co-production
- Mat Maitland – photography

== Charts ==
=== Weekly charts ===
Weekly chart performance for Night Swim
Chart (2015–2016)	Peak position
Belgian Albums (Ultratop Flanders)	169
Belgian Albums (Ultratop Wallonia)	31
French Albums (SNEP)	23
Scottish Albums (OCC)	87

=== Year-end charts ===
Year-end chart performance for Night Swim
Chart (2015)	Position
French Albums (SNEP)	194

== Release history ==
Release dates and formats for Night Swim
Region	Date	Format	Edition	Label	Ref.
France	23 October 2015	Digital download	Standard	Columbia	
United Kingdom	19 February 2016	Digital download; CD; LP	Standard; deluxe	Columbia	
