= Michaela Rose =

German singer

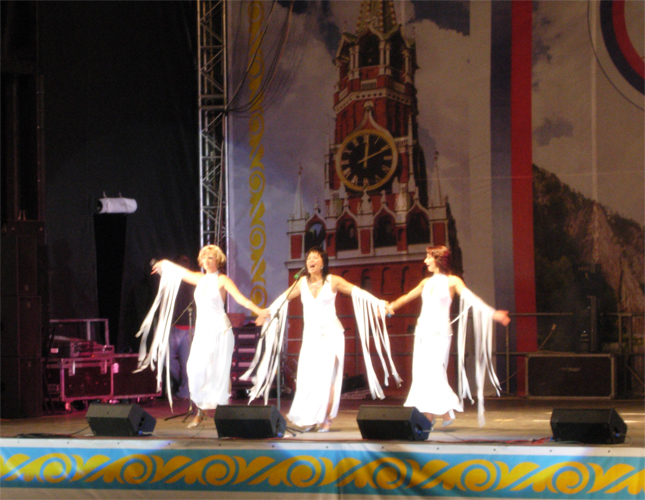

Background information
- Also known as: Michelle
- Born: Michaela Rose; 19 December 1958 (age 67); Switzerland
- Genres: Pop; Disco; Italo disco; House music
- Occupations: Singer
- Years active: 1970s-present
- Label: Monopol Records
- Member of: Arabesque
- Website: https://www.arabesque-music.de/

Michaela Rose (born 19 December 1958) is a German singer. She was an original member of the Arabesque disco group that started in 1977, and is the only original member still active in it. As of 2020, she continues to perform with the group, now known as "Arabesque featuring Michaela Rose".

== Life and career ==
Rose was born in Switzerland to a German mother and an Uzbekistani father in 1958. Her last name "Rose", comes from her Mexican-American stepfather. When she was 14, she moved from Italy, where she previously lived for two years, to Switzerland and later worked at a Veruschka boutique.

Rose later moved to Germany and auditioned for the Young Star Records Starchance '75 contest — where the winner would get the chance to be a member of a new music group. Rose won the audition, signed a contract with the record company, and became a founding member of the Arabesque group, along with Karen Ann Tepperis and Mary Ann Nagel. Michaela Rose and Arabesque found international success from the very beginning with Hello Mr. Monkey and 1978 Friday Night song and album of the same name. Their music was composed primarily by Jean Frankfurter, with lyrics by John Möring, and produced by Wolfgang Mewes. While often providing backing vocals for many of the Arabesque songs, Rose was in charge of the group's fashion, outfits, and costumes for performances. She toured extensively with Arabesque throughout Europe, Asia, and the Far East.

In 1984, Arabesque disbanded and she continued on with colleague Jasmin Vetter in the "Rouge" duo. Rouge had moderate success in the Japanese market. In 1989, Rouge also disbanded due to Vetter's pregnancy and marriage.

During the 1990s, Rose gained a deep interest in metaphysical naturalism. She even obtained a master's degree in USUI, kundalini and diamond Reiki. She is a licensed Tarot reader, Lifecoach, and Reiki Master.

Following 17 years of private life in Frankfurt, Germany, Rose was approached in 2006 by a Russian booking agent who revealed Arabesque's lasting success in the former Soviet Union. Encouraged by this interest, she re-formed the group with two new members in December 2006, performing under the name Arabesque original Michaela Rose. She has since toured widely across Europe and Asia.

In 2020, she released her first self-written single, Music Is Always the Key, produced by Jörg Dewald. The song was inspired by her experiences performing with artists across language barriers and emphasizes the unifying power of music. The official music video, directed by Erken Ialgashev, was filmed in Kazakhstan, Russia, Dubai, and Los Angeles, and features American actor Eric Roberts.
