= Marigot Bay (song) =

Single by Arabesque

from the album Marigot Bay
- B-side: "Hey, Catch On"
- Released: December 1980
- Genre: Pop, disco
- Length: 3:50
- Label: Metronome
- Songwriter(s): Jean Frankfurter; John Möring
- Producer(s): Wolfgang Mewes

Arabesque singles chronology
| "Once In A Blue Moon" (1980) | "Marigot Bay" (1980) | "Midnight Dancer" (1980) |

"Marigot Bay" is a song recorded in 1980 by the German disco group Arabesque. It is the title track from the band's studio album of the same name. It was released as a single in late 1980. It is most notable for being the group's first and only song to reach the Top 10 in their native country. It peaked at number 8 in West Germany, where it remained on the charts for 22 weeks, and at number 17 in Austria.

Sandra Ann Lauer sings the lead vocal in this pop song about lost love in the Caribbean beaches of Marigot Bay.

A German Cover Version exists by Gaby Baginsky.

== Track listing ==
1. A. "Marigot Bay" - 3:50
2. B. "Hey, Catch On" - 3:20

== Charts ==
=== Weekly charts ===
| Chart (1981) | Peak position |
|---|---|
| Austria (Ö3 Austria Top 40) | 17 |
| Germany (GfK) | 8 |

=== Year-end charts ===
| Chart (1981) | Position |
|---|---|
| Germany (Official German Charts) | 47 |
