= Josef Salvat =

Australian singer (born 1988)

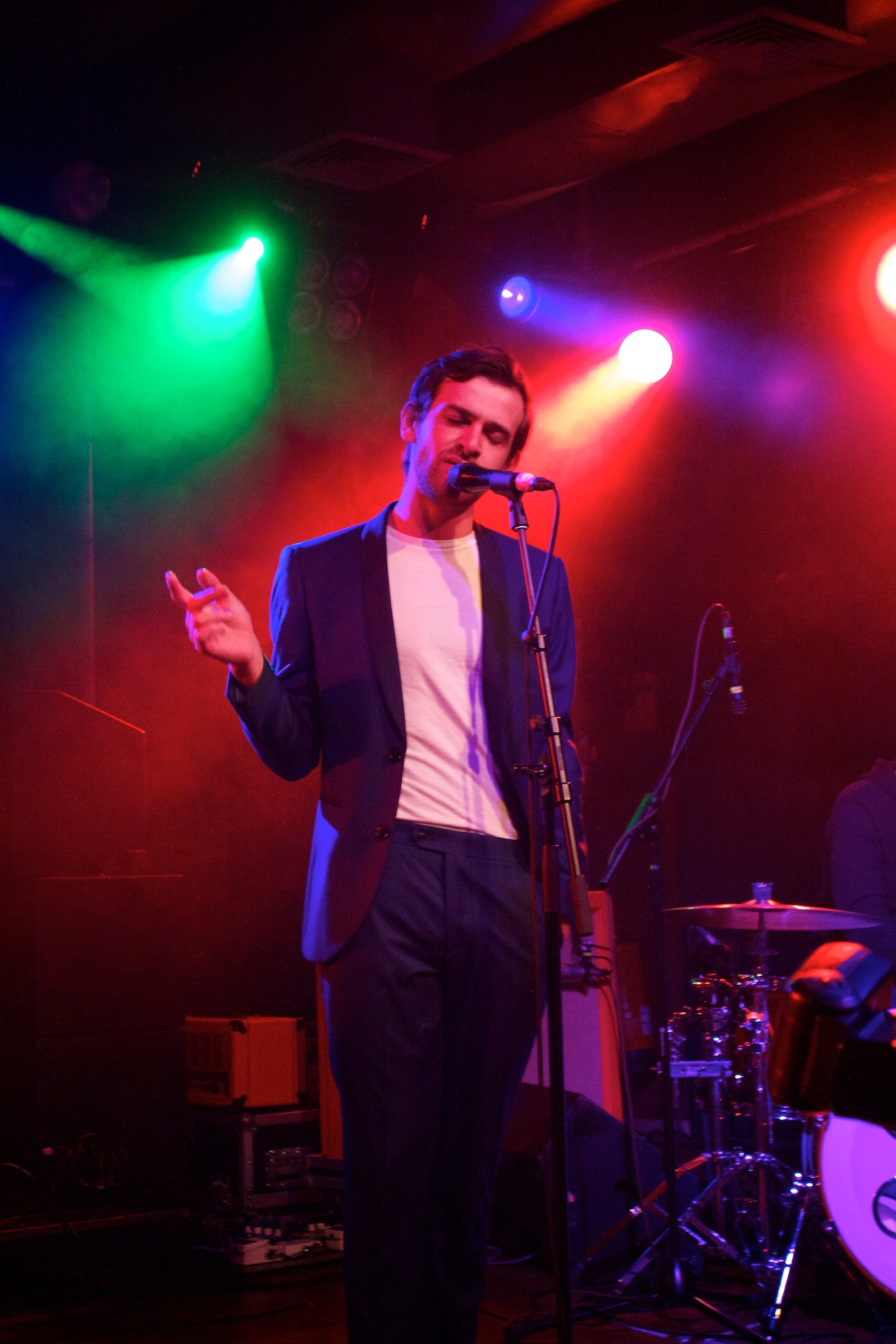

Background information
- Born: Josef Ignatius Salvat; 28 October 1988 (age 37); Sydney, Australia
- Genres: Pop; electropop
- Occupations: Singer; songwriter
- Years active: 2013–present
- Label: Columbia
- Website: www.josefsalvat.com

Josef Ignatius Salvat (born 28 October 1988) is an Australian singer and songwriter. He had his first international success after the release of his EP In Your Prime in 2014, which included a cover of Rihanna's song "Diamonds" that reached #2 in France and was used in a commercial by Sony under the Bravia brand. Salvat has released music in English and French, and has collaborated with Gryffin and Paloma Faith, writing the song "If Loving You Was Easy" for her album Infinite Things.

His first album, Night Swim, was released in 2015. Modern Anxiety was released in 2020, followed by Islands in 2022.

== Career ==
Salvat has appeared in a number of important music festivals including Lovebox Festival in London, Lowlands in the Netherlands and collaborated with British recording engineer, record producer and mixer Dan Grech-Marguerat. He also opened for American singer-songwriter Banks in the British leg of her Goddess Tour in November 2014. His song "Shoot and Run" has also been featured on a trailer for "Black Work" on ITV in June 2015. Within the early months of the year, his first single of 2015, entitled "Hustler" was released after the success of both songs. This song also came with the release of the song "Every Night", which was done so as a digital download. In the summer months of the year, the single "Till I Found You" was then released, which followed the song "Open Season" to be released a few months later. In October 2015, his debut album "Night Swim" was released in France with a UK release of both a standard and deluxe version of "Night Swim" in February 2016.

Afterwards, his single of 2016 was released in January, entitled "Paradise" and was later followed by the release of "Punchline" as a promotional single later in the month. His debut album was released worldwide on 12 February 2016.

During the early months of February 2016, he also appeared and as featured vocalist in GRYFFIN's debut single "Heading Home". On 10 June 2016, Josef Salvat released a track called "Complex" providing the vocals for Swedish DJ and producer Jonas Rathsman.

After taking a break from producing music, he released his album Modern Anxiety in 2020.

He released the single "I'm Sorry" (with a French version) in September 2021, and a second song called "Promiscuity" in January 2022. His third album Islands eventually came out on February 18, 2022.

== Personal life ==
His father is Spanish and he lived in Barcelona for a while.

Salvat is openly bisexual and has stated, "I've had numerous relationships with both genders so my songs are usually pronoun neutral. For artists like Olly from Years & Years and Sam Smith to use male pronouns, is great. It gives texture to their sound."

== Discography ==
Studio albums

- Night Swim (2015)
- Modern Anxiety (2020)
- Islands (2022)

Extended plays

- In Your Prime (2014)
- The Close / Le Réveil (2021)

== Tours ==
Supporting

- BANKS – Goddess Tour (2014)
- Paloma Faith - Infinite Things Tour (2021)
