= Friday Night (Arabesque song) =

Single by Arabesque

from the album Friday Night
- B-side: "Someone Is Waiting for You"
- Released: 1 November 1978
- Recorded: 25 May 1978
- Genre: Euro disco
- Length: 4:14
- Label: EMI (Germany & the Netherlands); Victor Records (Japan); Viking Records (Sweden)
- Songwriters: Jean Frankfurter; John Moering
- Producer: Wolfgang Mewes

Arabesque singles chronology
"Hello Mr. Monkey" (1977)	"Friday Night" (1978)	"Fly High Little Butterfly" (1978)

Friday Night was among the first songs credited to Jean Frankfurter and John Moering, which would go on to write all of Arabesque's future material. It was also the first song to feature the newest member of Arabesque, 19 year-old, Heike Rimbeau on lead vocals. Michaela and Karen provide backing vocals. The song expresses the singer's regret of not being able to be with her lover for "seven lonely days" until Friday night, during which they drink wine, kiss, and have sex. It was written during a time when the group's members had very little time to spend with their families and significant others. It was a huge hit in Japan, reaching number 9 on the charts.

== Track listing ==
1. A. "Friday Night" - 4:14
2. B. "Someone Is Waiting For You" - 4:04
