= Ghost Culture =

Studio album by Ghost Culture
- Released: 5 January 2015
- Recorded: Phantasy Sound Studios, London
- Genre: Alternative, electronic
- Length: 43:56
- Label: Phantasy Sound
- Producer: James Greenwood

Professional ratings
Aggregate scores
Source	Rating
Metacritic	80/100
Review scores
Source	Rating
Consequence of Sound	B
Drowned in Sound	8/10
The Observer	4/5 stars
Pitchfork Media	7.1/10.0
The Quietus	(favourable)

Ghost Culture is the debut studio album released by electronic musician James Greenwood under the name Ghost Culture. It was released on 12 January 2015 through Phantasy Sound, distributed through Because Music. Greenwood stated that his album was influenced by David Bowie's "Ziggy Stardust and the Spiders From Mars", "Construction Time Again" by Depeche Mode and "Fear of Music" by Talking Heads. Upon release, it reached No. 20 on the Independent Album Breakers chart. It was released to largely favourable reviews. The album was selected as Rough Trade record of the month in January 2015.

== Track listing ==
All tracks are written by James Greenwood.

No.	Title	Length
1.	"Mouth"	6:08
2.	"Giudecca"	4:12
3.	"Arms"	3:41
4.	"How"	3:11
5.	"Glass"	4:03
6.	"Glaciers"	3:48
7.	"Lying"	2:56
8.	"Lucky"	5:16
9.	"Answer"	6:20
10.	"The Fog"	4:11
