= The Wiseguys =

British electronic duo

- Origin: London, England
- Genres: Big beat, breakbeat, trip hop
- Years active: 1994–2001
- Label: Wall of Sound
- Past members: Touché; Regal

The Wiseguys were a British electronic duo active in the mid- to late 1990s. Although they released two albums as a duo, Touché was the only member involved in creating the second album, The Antidote, which includes the hits "Start the Commotion" and "Ooh La La", the former was prominently featured in a Mitsubishi TV advertisement and the latter was used in Budweiser commercials.

== Career ==
The band was formed in 1994 with two members, Touché (Theo Keating) and Regal (Paul Eve). They were music production partners from 1990 and released an EP called Ladies Say Ow! in 1994 on the Blackmarket International record label. The record label Wall of Sound signed the duo and released the double A-side "Nil by Mouth" / "Too Easy" in 1995. Their first album, Executive Suite was released in 1996 to critical acclaim, feature downtempo jazz beats and happy optimistic hip-hop numbers, and is now considered a cult classic.

Regal left the band in 1997 to pursue his career as co-founder of the UK's Bronx Dogs, and Touché worked on the second Wiseguys album, The Antidote. This was released in 1998, and contained their two most well-known songs, "Ooh La La" and "Start the Commotion". "Ooh La La" was a minor UK hit in April 1998, but in March 1999 it was re-released as a single and went to No. 2 on the UK Singles Chart following its use in a popular TV commercial for Budweiser. In 2001, "Start the Commotion" was shown on a Mitsubishi Motors television commercial in the United States, and the song reached the top 40 of the Billboard Hot 100.

== Solo work ==
The Wiseguys disbanded in 2001, and Touché continued as a solo artist producing house music on Fatboy Slim's Southern Fried record label. In July 2006, Regal released his first solo single, "Shock Ya Mind", on the Funk Weapons label.

On 31 December 2006, Executive Suite made its way onto the US version of iTunes. Touché is a producer and DJ, one half of the Black Ghosts. He produces under several other aliases including Fake Blood.

Regal also went solo; he signed to Unique Records in 2007 and has since released two solo albums and three singles for the label, including his debut solo album Loop Dreams and the CD Time Past, which is paired with his "Time Past" 12" remixes sampler, released in late 2009.

On 30 April 2024, Touché announced via his Instagram page that Regal has died.

== Discography ==
=== Albums ===
List of albums, with selected chart positions
Title	Details	Peak chart positions		
Title	Details	UK	AUS	US
Executive Suite	Released: 1996; Label: Wall of Sound	—	—	—
The Antidote	Released: 1998; Label: Wall of Sound	124	89	133

=== EPs ===
- Ladies Say Ow! (1994)

=== Compilation appearances ===
- Wall of Sound Essentials – Mixed by the Wiseguys (2000)

=== Singles ===
List of singles, with selected chart positions
Title	Year	Peak chart positions		Album
Title	Year	UK	US	Album
"Nil by Mouth"	1995	—	—	Executive Suite
"The Sound You Hear"/"We Keep On"	1996	—	—	Executive Suite
"Casino 'Sans Pareil'"/"A Better World"	1997	88	—	Executive Suite
"Ooh La La"	1998	2	—	The Antidote
"Start the Commotion"	1998	47	31	The Antidote

The Japanese version of The Antidote contains a bonus track, "Expand on the Topic" which features guest spots from J-Nise, Season and Sense Live, and was the B-side to the "Ooh La La" single.
