= Simon William Lord =

- Born: London, England
- Genres: Electronic, indie rock, synthpop, electro house
- Occupations: Record producer, songwriter, musician, remixer
- Years active: 2000–present

Simon William Lord is an English songwriter, record producer and musician. Lord was a member of the group Simian on vocals/guitar and now produces music as Lord Skywave. He is one half of the Black Ghosts, and records with the producer Lukid as Arclight.

== Lord Skywave ==
Lord's Lord Skywave album borrowed from the creativity of his family, using the Lord Skywave synthesizer his father, Jeremy Lord, built and compositions by his grandmother Madeleine Dring. It received very positive reviews, with an 8/10 from NME and 4/5 from Mojo, who described Lord as possessing "nu soul vocal talent to rival Jamie Lidell." Gigwise said the album is "refined, inventive and persistently unyielding." Lord Skywave has been remixed by TRG, Andy George and Various Production who produced a second, unreleased remix.

== Discography ==
- Simian (2001–2005) - vocals, guitar
- Robert Jesse & Simon Lord - "Within/Without" (single) (2005)
- Justice vs. Simian - "We Are Your Friends" (single) (2006)
- Bent - Intercept! (LP) (2006) - 2. "To Be Loved" (feat. Simon Lord) 7. "Waiting for You" (feat. Simon Lord) 9. "The Handbrake" (feat. Simon Lord) 11. "After All the Love" (feat. Simon Lord)
- Garden - Round and Round (LP) (2006)
- The Black Ghosts (2006–2009)
- Groove Armada - Soundboy Rock (LP) (2007) - 3. "The Things That We Could Share" (feat. Simon Lord)
- Lord Skywave – Lord Skywave (LP) (2008)
- Lord Skywave – "Something" (single) (2008)
- Roberts & Lord - Eponymous (LP) (2011)
- Roberts & Lord - Covers (EP) (2011)
- Mole Machine (Simon Lord) - Side A/Side B (recorded in 2001, unreleased demos) (on YouTube) (2012)
- Garden - 13 unreleased demo tracks (on YouTube) (2012)
- Plastic Plates - "Things I Didn't Know I Loved" (feat. Simon Lord) (single) (2012)
- Arclight – Holographic (EP) (2012)
- Simon Lord - One (LP) (2012)
- Arclight – Tumble Down (EP) (2013)
- Bent - From the Vaults, 1998-2006 (LP) (2013) - Disc 1: 12. "Translator" (feat. Simon Lord), Disc 2: 15. "Which Way Will They Turn?" (feat. Simon Lord)
- Menace & Lord - Sun, Moon & the Stars (LP) (2014)
- Simon Lord - Stripes (LP) (2014)
- Dillon Francis - Drunk All the Time (feat. Simon Lord) (single) (2014)
- Simon Lord - Marion Lightbody (demos, on YouTube) (EP) (2015)
