= Heike Rimbeau =

German disco singer (born 1959)

- Birth name: Heike Landvogt
- Born: 17 April 1959 (age 65); Frankfurt am Main, West Germany
- Occupation: Singer
- Years active: 1976–1979
- Labels: Koch Records International

Heike Rimbeau (née Landvogt; born 17 April 1959) is a German disco singer, known for being a member of the German disco trio, Arabesque.

== Life ==
Rimbeau began as a singer in the German group, Anyone Exact, in 1976 at sixteen years of age. By 1978, she had begun working at the Steigenberger hotel at Frankfurt am Main Airport as a clerk. She was chosen by Young Star Records to be part of the Arabesque in September of the same year following the departure of Mary Ann Nagel.

Immediately made the lead singer of the group, her vocals were featured on the 1978 album Friday Night, as well as on the group's successful single "Fly High Little Butterfly". By January 1979, Rimbeau was married and pregnant; she was forced to leave Arabesque, and gave her final performance on 26 March 1979 on Disco. Shortly afterwards, Sandra Ann Lauer replaced her as the third lead singer of Arabesque.
