= Arabesque (group) =

German female trio group

- The classic Arabesque lineup (1980): (From top) Jasmin Vetter, Sandra Lauer, Michaela Rose

Background information
- Origin: Frankfurt, West Germany (now Germany)
- Genres: Euro disco; pop; dance pop
- Years active: 1977–1984; 2006-present
- Labels: RCA; Victor
- Members: Michaela Rose; Sabine Kemper; Silke Brauner
- Past members: Sandra Lauer (1979-1984); Jasmin Vetter (1978-1984); Elke Brückheimer (1979); Heike Rimbeau (1978-1979); Karen Ann Tepperis (1977-1978); Mary Ann Nagel (1977-1978)
- Website: arabesque-music.com

Arabesque are a German girl group formed at the height of the European disco era in 1977, in the West German city of Frankfurt. The group's changing lineup worked with the German composer Jean Frankfurter (Erich Ließmann).

Arabesque were especially popular in Japan. Their songs began being aired on Japanese late-night radio shows in the late 1970s, and with support from groups such as the Takenoko-zoku, they became especially popular with teenagers and a driving force behind the popularity of Western music in Japan in the early 1980s. Their popularity also spread to South Korea, Chinese-speaking countries and other parts of Asia, Eastern Europe and Latin America.

== History ==
=== 1975–1978: Formation and early years ===
In 1975, schlager music singer Mary Ann Nagel proposed a girl group to producer Wolfgang Mewes, who accepted. Two additional members were recruited through a singing competition. A Brit (Karen Ann Tepperis), a German-Mexican (Michaela Rose), and a German (Mary Ann Nagel) comprised the initial group.

After the first album, the band lineup changed by keeping only the original member Michaela Rose, while replacing the two other girls, Karen Ann Tepperis and Mary Ann Nagel, with new members Jasmin Vetter and Heike Rimbeau, respectively. Nagel was replaced due to family commitments and becoming tired of the long daily commute from Karlsruhe to Frankfurt am Main, where the group was based. Tepperis was replaced shortly after the release of Friday Night in 1978, due to the fact that she was pregnant and could not go on tour. The surprising overnight success of Hello Mr. Monkey in Japan prompted the producers to schedule an immediate tour to Japan. The duration of Heike Rimbeau in the group was also short-lived; due to her pregnancy in 1978, she was briefly substituted with Elke Brückheimer. This West German country singer appeared only in a few live performances during the year 1979. However, shortly afterward, she too was replaced by Sandra Lauer. Lauer had previously attended the Young Star Music contest in 1975, where she achieved a record deal and released the song "Andy mein Freund" (My Friend, Andy). In 1979, at age 17, Lauer was invited to become the lead singer of Arabesque.

=== 1979–1984: Breakthrough ===
Arabesque became extremely popular in Japan and South Korea, and also had success in the USSR and the Eastern Bloc. The group first appeared in Japan in 1979 for a television special, performing Hello Mr. Monkey on the "11PM" TV show. Lauer even spent her 18th birthday in Japan while they were on tour there in May 1980. They later took part in the Seoul Song Festival, in 1981. Further, the group performed a number of concerts in Japan between 1980 and 1982. During these, they released a live album, dubbed "Fancy Concert". All in all, Arabesque came to Japan on tours a total of 6 times during their career.

Back at home, in West Germany in 1980, the single "Take Me Don't Break Me" became a hit, which only scraped the German Top 40. Their next single, "Marigot Bay", would become their only Top Ten hit a few weeks later. They made multiple TV appearances in Europe with this song about a lost love. Arabesque never had the same level of success in West Germany than in the Far East. Albeit they were almost identical in appearance to other European disco trios (i.e. A La Carte or Luv'), their songs were mostly written to cater a Japanese audience, instead of the European discotheque scene. 5 albums were released in their entirety in West Germany. The group did release in some 20 other countries, such as Italy, Mexico, Scandinavia, and they had a Number 1 album in Argentina.

The group's two last singles, 'Ecstasy' and 'Time To Say Goodbye' became hits in various European markets after they split, as they sounded very close to the Italo disco sound which was a very popular music genre in Europe in the mid-1980s. Those songs spread and gained success through LP compilations of dance/pop music and bootleg tapes, so the band could never take advantage of this success.

=== 1985–1989: Duo Rouge ===
Rouge
- Origin: Frankfurt, West Germany
- Genre: Euro disco
- Years active: 1985–1989
- Past members: Jasmin Vetter; Michaela Rose

After they split up in 1984, Jasmin and Michaela continued on as the duo "Rouge". The duo aimed to continue the tradition and style of Arabesque, and surprisingly featured Jasmin Vetter as the lead singer.

=== After split ===
After split, Sandra embarked in a solo career becoming a successful singer worldwide. While Sandra's success spread worldwide, the interest on Arabesque raised as well. The last Arabesque singles also introduced the "Italo disco" sound to Japan, under the term "eurobeat", previously used in the UK for the Stock Aitken Waterman productions.

=== 2006–present: Comebacks ===
- On 16 December 2006, Michaela Rose restarted the Group as „Arabesque feat. Michaela Rose“ with two new members, Sabine Kaemper and Silke Brauner) headlined the second "Legends of Retro FM" festival in Moscow. Since then, they've performed in many countries worldwide.
- In 2008, Michaela Rose recorded a former Hit of Arabesque, “Marigot Bay 2008”, released by Monopol Records.
- In 2017, Michaela Rose re-recorded one of the Arabesque songs, "Zanzibar", that was released with a support from Monopol Records
- Also in 2017, Jasmin Vetter launched her own reincarnation of the group (Jasmin Vetter of Arabesque and the City Cats), as part of a celebration of the 40-year anniversary of the group.
- In 2018, Michaela Rose released the Album “The Upgraded Collection” with 13 renewed and refreshed Songs of “Arabesque” under “Arabesque original Michaela Rose” also at Monopol Records.
- 2021 “Arabesque original Michaela Rose” released together with DJ NEJTRINO the new version of the Arabesque Hit “Friday Night” as “Friday Night the Oriental Night Mix” at the Label L Music.

== Discography ==
- 1978 – Friday Night (also called Arabesque I)
- 1979 – City Cats (also called Arabesque II)
- 1980 – Marigot Bay (also called Arabesque III)
- 1980 – Midnight Dancer (also called Arabesque IV)
- 1981 – In for a Penny (also called Arabesque V or Billy's Barbeque)
- 1982 – Caballero (also called Arabesque VI)
- 1982 – Why No Reply (also called Arabesque VII)
- 1983 – Loser Pays the Piper (also called Arabesque VIII)
- 1984 – Time to Say Goodbye (also called Arabesque IX)
- 2018 – The Up Graded Collection
- 2019 - The Greatest Hits ever....
