= Röyksopp discography =

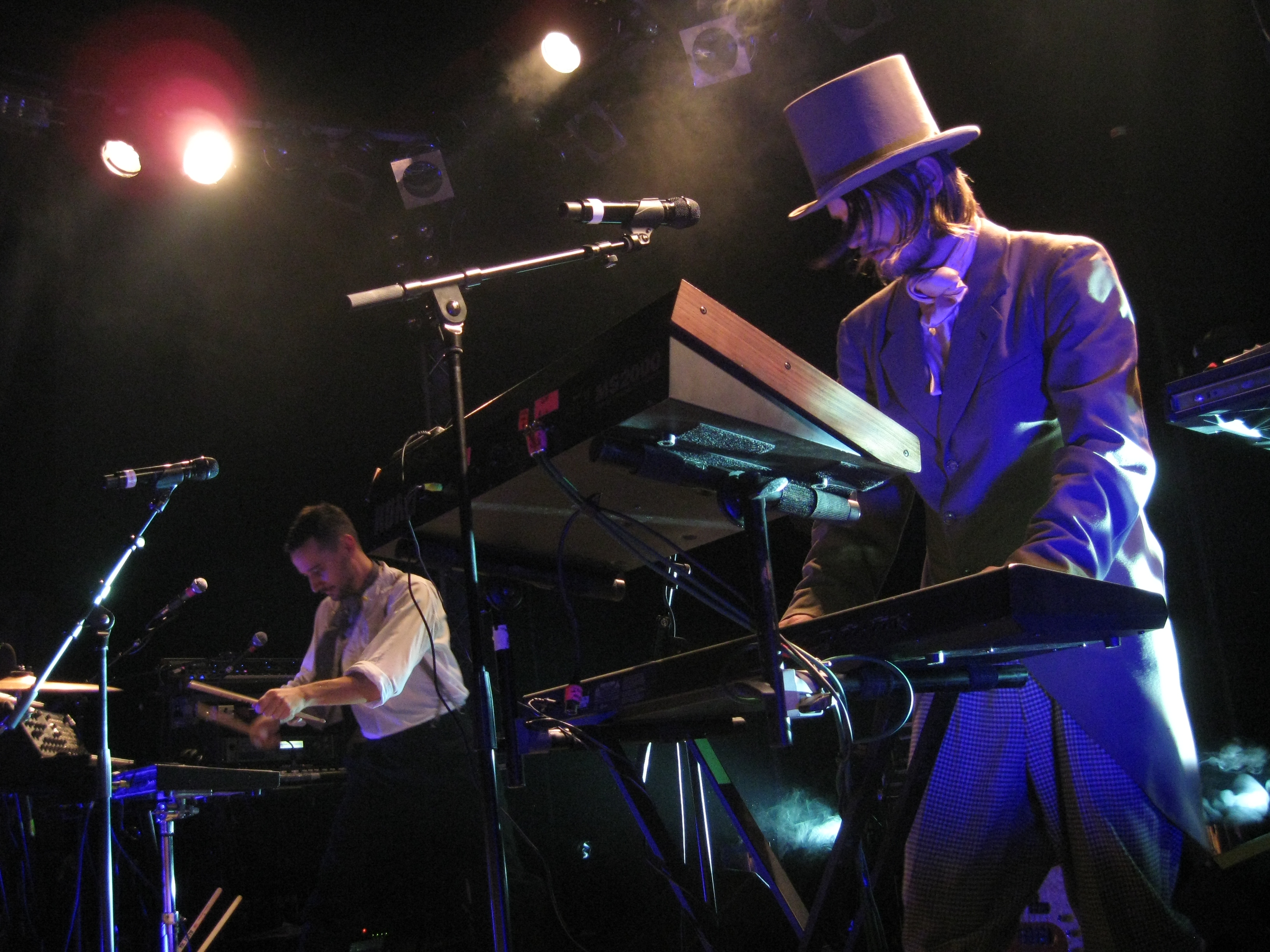
- Röyksopp performing in Berlin on 7 April 2009
- Studio albums: 10
- Extended plays: 2
- Singles: 51
- Music videos: 21
- Promotional singles: 1
- Mix albums: 2

Norwegian electronic music duo Röyksopp have released ten studio albums, two mix albums, two extended plays, 51 singles, one promotional single and 21 music videos.

== Albums ==
=== Studio albums ===
List of studio albums, with selected chart positions, sales figures and certifications
Title	Album details	Peak chart positions										Sales	Certifications
Title	Album details	NOR	AUS	DEN	FRA	GER	IRE	NL	SWE	UK	US	Sales	Certifications
Melody A.M.	Released: 3 September 2001; Label: Wall of Sound; Formats: CD, LP, digital download	1	—	—	84	—	18	69	50	9	—	World: 1,000,000; UK: 454,271	IFPI NOR: Platinum; BPI: Platinum; NVPI: Platinum
The Understanding	Released: 22 June 2005; Label: Wall of Sound; Formats: CD, LP, digital download	1	98	36	45	41	16	48	7	13	—	UK: 103,500	BPI: Gold
Junior	Released: 18 March 2009; Label: Wall of Sound; Formats: CD, LP, digital download	1	28	17	70	35	52	43	25	21	126	UK: 36,239	
Senior	Released: 8 September 2010; Label: Wall of Sound; Formats: CD, LP, digital download	1	80	30	128	52	58	41	17	33	—		
The Inevitable End	Released: 10 November 2014; Label: Dog Triumph; Formats: CD, LP, digital download	2	23	34	137	54	75	53	50	38	103		
Profound Mysteries	Released: 29 April 2022; Label: Dog Triumph; Formats: CD, LP, cassette, digital download	6	—	—	—	66	—	—	—	80	—		
Profound Mysteries II	Released: 19 August 2022; Label: Dog Triumph; Formats: CD, LP, cassette, digital download	35	—	—	—	91	—	—	—	—	—		
Profound Mysteries III	Released: 18 November 2022; Label: Dog Triumph; Formats: CD, LP, cassette, digital download	16	—	—	—	61	—	—	—	—	—		
Nebulous Nights (An Ambient Excursion into Profound Mysteries)	Released: 13 December 2024; Label: Dog Triumph; Formats: digital download	—	—	—	—	—	—	—	—	—	—		
True Electric	Released: 11 April 2025; Label: Dog Triumph; Formats: CD, LP, digital download	23	—	—	—	20	—	—	—	—	—		
"—" denotes a recording that did not chart or was not released in that territory.

=== Mix albums ===
List of mix albums, with selected chart positions
Title	Album details	Peak chart positions
Title	Album details	NOR
Back to Mine: Röyksopp	Released: 5 March 2007; Label: DMC; Format: CD	24
Late Night Tales: Röyksopp	Released: 14 June 2013; Label: Late Night Tales; Formats: CD, LP, digital download	—
"—" denotes a recording that did not chart or was not released in that territory.

== Extended plays ==
List of extended plays, with selected chart positions
Title	Extended play details	Peak chart positions							
Title	Extended play details	NOR	AUS	BEL (FL)	DEN	GER	IRE	UK	US
Röyksopp's Night Out	Released: 1 February 2006; Label: Wall of Sound; Formats: CD, digital download	8	—	76	3	—	—	—	—
Do It Again (with Robyn)	Released: 23 May 2014; Labels: Dog Triumph; Formats: CD, LP, digital download	3	14	—	5	70	23	20	14
"—" denotes a recording that did not chart or was not released in that territory.

== Singles ==
List of singles, with selected chart positions, showing year released and album name
Title	Year	Peak chart positions										Album
Title	Year	NOR	AUS	DEN	FRA	GER	IRE	NL	SWE	UK	US Dance	Album
"So Easy"	1999	—	—	—	—	—	—	—	—	21	—	Melody A.M.
"Eple"	2001	—	—	—	—	—	33	91	54	16 (Note: "Eple" originally reached number 122 on the UK Singles Chart, but reached a new peak of number 16 when re-released in February 2003.)	—	Melody A.M.
"Poor Leno"	2001	—	—	—	—	—	—	55	50	38 (Note: "Poor Leno" originally reached number 59 on the UK Singles Chart, but reached a new peak of number 38 when re-released in November 2002.)	5	Melody A.M.
"Remind Me"	2002	—	—	—	—	—	—	—	—	21	—	Melody A.M.
"Sparks"	2003	—	—	—	—	—	—	—	—	41	—	Melody A.M.
"Only This Moment"	2005	—	—	—	—	—	—	86	—	33	18	The Understanding
"49 Percent"	2005	—	—	—	—	—	—	—	—	55	—	The Understanding
"Curves"	2005	—	—	—	—	—	—	—	—	—	—	Non-album single
"What Else Is There?"	2005	4	—	—	—	76	—	—	30	32	—	The Understanding
"Beautiful Day Without You"	2006	—	—	—	—	—	—	—	—	—	—	The Understanding
"Happy Up Here"	2009	3	—	—	73	—	—	—	—	44	—	Junior
"The Girl and the Robot"	2009	2	—	—	—	—	—	—	25	—	—	Junior
"This Must Be It"	2009	—	—	—	—	—	—	—	—	—	—	Junior
"The Drug"	2010	—	—	—	—	—	—	—	—	—	—	Senior
"Forsaken Cowboy"	2011	—	—	—	—	—	—	—	—	—	—	Senior
"Running to the Sea" (featuring Susanne Sundfør)	2012	14	—	10	—	—	—	—	—	—	—	The Inevitable End
"Daddy's Groove"	2013	—	—	—	—	—	—	—	—	—	—	Late Night Tales: Röyksopp
"Ice Machine" (Depeche Mode cover)	2013	—	—	—	—	—	—	—	—	—	—	Late Night Tales: Röyksopp
"Twenty Thirteen" (featuring Jamie Irrepressible)	2014	—	—	—	—	—	—	—	—	—	—	Non-album single
"Do It Again" (with Robyn)	2014	—	99	18	117	—	91	65	16	75	1	Do It Again
"Sayit" (with Robyn)	2014	—	—	—	—	—	—	—	—	—	—	Do It Again
"Monument" (with Robyn)	2014	—	—	—	—	—	—	—	—	—	—	Do It Again
"Monument" (The Inevitable End version) (featuring Robyn)	2014	—	—	—	—	—	—	—	—	—	—	The Inevitable End
"Skulls"	2014	—	—	—	—	—	—	—	—	—	—	The Inevitable End
"Sordid Affair"	2014	—	—	—	—	—	—	—	—	—	—	The Inevitable End
"I Had This Thing"	2015	—	—	—	—	—	—	—	—	—	24	The Inevitable End
"Never Ever" (featuring Susanne Sundfør)	2016	22	—	—	—	—	—	—	—	—	—	Non-album singles
"To minutter" (with Lars Vaular)	2019	31	—	—	—	—	—	—	—	—	—	Non-album singles
"Here She Comes Again"	2020	—	—	—	—	—	—	—	—	—	—	The Inevitable End
"(Nothing But) Ashes..."	2022	—	—	—	—	—	—	—	—	—	—	Profound Mysteries
"The Ladder"	2022	—	—	—	—	—	—	—	—	—	—	Profound Mysteries
"Impossible" (featuring Alison Goldfrapp)	2022	—	—	—	—	—	—	—	—	—	—	Profound Mysteries
"This Time, This Place..." (featuring Beki Mari)	2022	—	—	—	—	—	—	—	—	—	—	Profound Mysteries
"Breathe" (featuring Astrid S)	2022	—	—	—	—	—	—	—	—	—	—	Profound Mysteries
"If You Want Me" (featuring Susanne Sundfør)	2022	— (Note: "If You Want Me" did not enter the Norway Singles Chart, but peaked at number four on the Norway Radio Chart.)	—	—	—	—	—	—	—	—	—	Profound Mysteries
"Sorry" (featuring Jamie Irrepressible)	2022	—	—	—	—	—	—	—	—	—	—	Profound Mysteries II
"Unity" (featuring Karen Harding)	2022	—	—	—	—	—	—	—	—	—	—	Profound Mysteries II
"Control"	2022	—	—	—	—	—	—	—	—	—	—	Profound Mysteries II
"Let's Get It Right" (featuring Astrid S)	2022	—	—	—	—	—	—	—	—	—	—	Profound Mysteries II
"Oh, Lover" (featuring Susanne Sundfør)	2022	—	—	—	—	—	—	—	—	—	—	Profound Mysteries II
"Speed King"	2022	—	—	—	—	—	—	—	—	—	—	Profound Mysteries III
"The Night" (featuring Alison Goldfrapp)	2022	—	—	—	—	—	—	—	—	—	—	Profound Mysteries III
"Me&Youphoria"	2022	—	—	—	—	—	—	—	—	—	—	Profound Mysteries III
"Just Wanted to Know" (featuring Astrid S)	2022	—	—	—	—	—	—	—	—	—	—	Profound Mysteries III
"Feel It" (featuring Maurissa Rose)	2022	—	—	—	—	—	—	—	—	—	—	Profound Mysteries III
"Stay Awhile" (featuring Susanne Sundfør)	2022	—	—	—	—	—	—	—	—	—	—	Profound Mysteries III
"Beacons" (featuring Susanne Sundfør)	2025	—	—	—	—	—	—	—	—	—	—	Nebulous Nights (An Ambient Excursion into Profound Mysteries)
"What Else Is There?" (True Electric) (featuring Fever Ray and Trentemøller)	2025	—	—	—	—	—	—	—	—	—	—	True Electric
"Do It Again" (True Electric) (featuring Robyn)	2025	—	—	—	—	—	—	—	—	—	—	True Electric
"Running to the Sea" (True Electric) (featuring Susanne Sundfør and Barker & Baumecker)	2025	—	—	—	—	—	—	—	—	—	—	True Electric
"Adversity & Hope"	2025	—	—	—	—	—	—	—	—	—	—	Facing War original soundtrack
"—" denotes a recording that did not chart or was not released in that territory.

=== Promotional singles ===
Title	Year	Album
"None of Dem" (Robyn featuring Röyksopp)	2010	Body Talk Pt. 1

== Guest appearances ==
List of non-single guest appearances, showing year released and album name
Title	Year	Album
"Your Hands"	1999	Arctic Circles 2
"Wooden Leg"	2000	Le Big Sloppy Kiss
"64 Position" (live version)	2001	Wall of Sound Presents Tellé
"A Quiet Life"	2001	Arctic Circles 3
"In Space" (featuring Kari Amirian)	2008	RAM Café 3: Lounge & Chillout
"Bounty Hunters"	2016	Star Wars Headspace
"Mysteries of Love" (with Ionnalee)	2019	Remember the Future
"Everywhere I Go (Remind Me)" (with Bnyx and Kid Cudi)	2026	Genesis FM

== Remixes ==
Title	Year	Artist(s)
"Endless Love" (Röyksopp Analoge Euromiks)	1999	Frost
"Sexy Love" (Röyksopp Romantiske Sløyd)	2000	Anneli Drecker
"Please Stay" (Röyksopp Remix)	2000	Mekon featuring Marc Almond
"What Does It Feel Like?" (Röyksopp Return the Sun Remix)	2001	Felix da Housecat featuring Miss Kittin and Melistar
"I Don't Know What I Can Save You From" (Röyksopp Remix)	2001	Kings of Convenience
"Cry Baby" (Röyksopp's Målselves Memorabilia Mix)	2001	Spiller
"Weak Become Heroes" (Röyksopp's Memory Lane Mix)	2002	The Streets
"Weak Become Heroes" (Röyksopp's Memory Lane Dub)	2002	The Streets
"My Head Sounds Like That" (Röyksopp Remix)	2002	Peter Gabriel
"A Feeling of Care" (Mer (100km/t))	2003	Athome Project
"A Feeling of Care" (Salt (MS-20))	2003	Athome Project
"A Feeling of Care" (Hav (Rus))	2003	Athome Project
"Clocks" (Röyksopp Trembling Heart Mix)	2003	Coldplay
"Heartbeat" (Röyksopp's Mindre Tilgjengelige Remix)	2004	Annie
"Colossal Insight" (Röyksopp Remix)	2005	Roots Manuva
"Still Missing" (Röyksopp Remix)	2005	Beck
"Sing a Song" (Röyksopp I Kramsnø Remix)	2006	Eri Nobuchika
"Judas" (Röyksopp's European Imbecile Mix)	2011	Lady Gaga
"Puppets" (Röyksopp Remix)	2011	Depeche Mode
"In This Shirt" (Röyksopp Remix)	2011	The Irrepressibles
"Judas" (Röyksopp's 30 Pieces Mix)	2011	Lady Gaga
"The Immortals" (Röyksopp Remix)	2011	Kings of Leon
"Never Ever" (RYXP Club Mix)	2017	Röyksopp
"Breathe" (Röyksopp Remix)	2022	Röyksopp
"Find Xanadu" (Röyksopp Remix)	2025	Alison Goldfrapp

== Special releases ==
Title	Year	Notes
"Happy Birthday"	2008	Released as a free download on the duo's website on 15 December 2008 to celebrate their tenth birthday.
"De Ushuaia a La Quiaca" (Version RYXP)	2010	Contains a sample from the song of the same name by Gustavo Santaolalla. Released on the duo's website on 26 February 2010 as "Track of the Month" for March.
"Electric Counterpoint: III. Fast – RYXP's Milde Salve"	2010	Remixes of "Electric Counterpoint III Fast" composed by Steve Reich and performed by Pat Metheny. Released on the duo's website on 1 April 2010 as "Track of the Month" for March.
"Electric Counterpoint: III. Fast – RYXP True to Original Edit"	2010	Remixes of "Electric Counterpoint III Fast" composed by Steve Reich and performed by Pat Metheny. Released on the duo's website on 1 April 2010 as "Track of the Month" for March.
"Hus Nr. 9"	2010	Released on the duo's website on 1 July 2010 as "Track of the Month".
"This Space"	2010	Released on the duo's website on 6 August 2010 as "Track of the Month".
"Malangen Fra Bruhodet"	2010	Released on the duo's website on 2 September 2010 as "Track of the Month".
"I Wanna Know"	2010	Released on the duo's website on 19 October 2010 as "Track of the Month".
"Le Cantique de Noël"	2010	Instrumental version of the Christmas carol which is also known as "O Holy Night", released on the duo's website on 6 December 2010 as "Track of the Month" for November and December.
"Stronghold"	2011	Released on the duo's website on 7 February 2011 as "Track of the Month" for January.
"Shores of Easy"	2011	Released as a free download on the duo's website on 29 August 2011 as "Track of the Moment".
"I Wanna Know"	2019	Released 27 February on streaming services in the Lost Tapes playlist. Previously released as a free download on the duo's website.
"Rising Urge"	2019	Released 27 February on streaming services in the Lost Tapes playlist.
"In the End" (featuring Susanne Sundfør and Man Without Country)	2019	Released 3 April on streaming services in the Lost Tapes playlist. Originally released as a bonus track on the vinyl re-issue of The Inevitable End.
"Church"	2019	Released 1 May on streaming services in the Lost Tapes playlist.
"Across the Graveyard" (featuring Anneli Drecker)	2019	Released 5 June on streaming services in the Lost Tapes playlist. Originally released as a bonus track for Junior.
"Rescue"	2019	Released 26 July on streaming services in the Lost Tapes playlist.
"I Just Don't Understand You"	2019	Released 13 September on streaming services in the Lost Tapes playlist. Originally released as a bonus track for Japanese edition of The Inevitable End.
"Ice Machine" (featuring Susanne Sundfør)	2019	Released 11 October on streaming services in the Lost Tapes playlist. The track was featured on the band's mix album Late Night Tales: Röyksopp in 2013.
"Shores of Easy"	2019	Released 15 November on streaming services in the Lost Tapes playlist. Previously released in 2011 as a free download on the duo's website and named "Track of the Moment".
"Were You Ever Wanted" (featuring Lykke Li)	2019	Released 27 December on streaming services in the Lost Tapes playlist. Originally released as a bonus track for Japanese edition of Junior.
"Andromeda"	2020	Released 6 March on streaming services in the Lost Tapes playlist. Unreleased track, played multiple times during band's tours in 2012 and 2013.
"Gentle Movement"	2020	Released 1 April on streaming services in the Lost Tapes playlist. Features Kjetil Møster.
"Shine on Like the Stars" (featuring Anneli Drecker)	2020	Released 19 May on streaming services in the Lost Tapes playlist. Unreleased track that was recorded in 2003.
"Oblique Thrills"	2020	Released 5 June on streaming services in the Lost Tapes playlist. The song was recorded in February 2020.
"Alpha Male" [Live]	2020	Released 7 August on streaming services in the Lost Tapes playlist.

== Music videos ==
List of music videos, showing year released and directors
Title	Year	Director(s)
"Eple"	2001	Thomas Hilland
"Poor Leno"	2001	Sam Arthur
"Remind Me"	2002	H5
"Sparks"	2003	Thomas Hilland
"Only This Moment"	2005	Brendan McNamee and Robert Chandler
"49 Percent"	2005	Brendan McNamee
"What Else Is There?"	2005	Martin de Thurah
"Beautiful Day Without You"	2006	Damien Ferrié
"Happy Up Here"	2009	Reuben Sutherland
"The Girl and the Robot"	2009	Michael Baldwin
"This Must Be It"	2009	Andreas Nilsson and Filip Nilsson
"The Drug"	2010	that go
"Sayit" (with Robyn)	2014	Sandberg & Timonen and Kacper Kasprzyk
"Do It Again" (with Robyn)	2014	Martin de Thurah
"Monument" (with Robyn)	2014	Max Vitali
"Monument" (The Inevitable End Version)	2014	Stian Andersen
"Skulls"	2014	Stian Andersen and Röyksopp
"I Had This Thing"	2015	Roboshobo (Robert Schober)
"Running To The Sea"	2015	Lauren Rothery
"Never Ever"	2016	Röyksopp
"The Next Day" (Mind Against Remix)	2023	Jonathan Zawada
