= True Electric =

Remix album by Röyksopp
- Released: 11 April 2025
- Length: 112:33
- Label: Dog Triumph
- Producer: Röyksopp

Röyksopp chronology
Nebulous Nights (An Ambient Excursion into Profound Mysteries) (2024)	True Electric (2025)

Singles from True Electric
- 1. "What Else Is There? (True Electric)" Released: 22 January 2025; 2. "Do It Again (True Electric)" Released: 21 February 2025; 3. "Running to the Sea (True Electric)" Released: 21 March 2025

True Electric is the tenth studio album by Norwegian electronic music duo Röyksopp, released on 11 April 2025, on the band's own label Dog Triumph. The album is a compilation of dance remixes of Röyksopp earlier tracks, which are studio versions of the tracks performed during their True Electric tour.

On streaming platforms, True Electric was released in two versions, a mixed version and a standard with separate tracks.

== Background ==
True Electric followed the earlier compilation of ambient versions of track from the Profound Mysteries trilogy (2022), the surprise-released album Nebulous Nights (An Ambient Excursion into Profound Mysteries), from December 2024.

The album consists of nineteen studio versions of remixes played on the True Electric tour, and includes the previously unreleased track "The R", alongside newly reworked versions and remixes from the band's catalogue. The band stated the tour was "to put an emphasis on the clubbier aspects of our music."

The first single was a new version of the single "What Else Is There" which features vocals of Fever Ray, from the 2005 album The Understanding, based on the remix by Trentemøller. The accompanying video for the remix was directed by Stian Andersen and features clips of the band’s 2023 gig in Athens, Greece.

== Critical reception ==
Billboard praised the second single, the remix of "Do It Again", for isolating the vocals in just the right moments", which made an impression of "eventually exploding into all-out, all-encompassing dancefloor delirium."

The culture site EDM Identity praised True Electric the "club-forward reimagining of their legacy that pulses with both nostalgia and new energy", and Röyksopp themselves for "effortlessly dance between melancholia and euphoria, nostalgia and futurism."

== Track listing ==
True Electric mixed version track listing
No.	Title	Original album	Length
1.	"The Ladder (True Electric)"	Profound Mysteries (2022)	6:01
2.	"Impossible (True Electric)" (featuring Alison Goldfrapp)	Profound Mysteries (2022)	5:43
3.	"This Time, This Place (True Electric)" (featuring Beki Mari)	Profound Mysteries (2022)	7:37
4.	"The Girl and the Robot (True Electric)" (featuring Robyn)	Junior (2009)	5:43
5.	"Here She Comes Again (True Electric)" (featuring Jamie Irrepressible)	The Inevitable End (2014)	5:04
6.	"Monument (True Electric)" (featuring Robyn)	Do It Again EP (2014)	6:55
7.	"Oh, Lover (True Electric)" (featuring Susanne Sundfør)	Profound Mysteries II (2022)	7:29
8.	"Unity (True Electric)" (featuring Karen Harding)	Profound Mysteries II (2022)	4:39
9.	"You Don’t Have a Clue (True Electric)" (featuring Anneli Drecker)	Junior (2009)	4:51
10.	"The “R” (True Electric)"	(New track)	4:44
11.	"Breathe (True Electric)" (featuring Astrid S)	Profound Mysteries (2022)	4:48
12.	"Running to the Sea (True Electric)" (featuring Susanne Sundfør)	The Inevitable End (2014)	6:02
13.	"What Else Is There? (True Electric)" (featuring Fever Ray)	The Understanding (2005)	6:13
14.	"Never Ever (True Electric)" (featuring Susanne Sundfør)	(Non-album single) (2016)	5:50
15.	"Sordid Affair (True Electric)" (featuring Man Without Country)	The Inevitable End (2014)	6:34
16.	"I Had This Thing (True Electric)" (featuring Jamie Irrepressible)	The Inevitable End (2014)	6:44
17.	"Feel It (True Electric)" (featuring Maurissa Rose)	Profound Mysteries III (2022)	5:37
18.	"Do It Again (True Electric)" (featuring Robyn)	Do It Again EP (2014)	4:11
19.	"Like an Old Dog (True Electric)" (featuring Pixx)	Profound Mysteries III (2022)	7:48

== Charts ==
Chart performance for True Electric
Chart (2025)	Peak position
German Albums (Offizielle Top 100)	20
Norwegian Albums (VG-lista)	23
Scottish Albums (OCC)	85
UK Independent Albums (OCC)	29
