= Nebulous Nights (An Ambient Excursion into Profound Mysteries) =

Remix album by Röyksopp
- Released: 13 December 2024
- Length: 139:16
- Label: Dog Triumph
- Producer: Röyksopp

Röyksopp chronology
Profound Mysteries III (2022)	Nebulous Nights (An Ambient Excursion into Profound Mysteries) (2024)	True Electric (2025)

Singles from Nebulous Nights
- 1. "Beacons" Released: 3 January 2025

Nebulous Nights (An Ambient Excursion into Profound Mysteries) is the ninth studio album by Norwegian electronic music duo Röyksopp, released on 13 December 2024, on the band's own label Dog Triumph. The album is a compilation of ambient reinterpretations of tracks from the Profound Mysteries trilogy of albums, Profound Mysteries, Profound Mysteries II, and Profound Mysteries III, released throughout 2022.

== Background ==
Following the original 2022 versions, the ambient reinterpretation, were recorded live for Nebulous Nights, and feature collaborations with original vocalists including Alison Goldfrapp, Susanne Sundfør, Pixx, and Astrid S, as well as the designer Jonathan Zawada.

In 2025, Nebulous Nights was followed by a compilation of dance remixes of Röyksopp earlier tracks True Electric.

== Critical reception ==
Professional ratings
Review scores
Source	Rating
Klassekampen	5/6 stars
Aftenposten	5/6
Bergens Tidende	5/6 hearts

The culture site EDM Identity described Nebulous Nights as "a cinematic experience of long, and layered sounds flow seamlessly". "This audio is barely noticeable in some tracks. It softly floats under the synth lines, almost like the detached voice of a guide leading you through the journey."

== Track listing ==
True Electric mixed version track listing
No.	Title	Length
1.	"Waking Up from a Thousand Year Slumber" (featuring Astrid S)	6:57
2.	"Slow Fade / R"	1:32
3.	"We Enter / State of Awareness" (featuring Alison Goldfrapp)	3:30
4.	"The Uxtáca Bridge"	5:21
5.	"Soft Ascension" (featuring Pixx)	3:04
6.	"Flumen Aeternum" (featuring Jamie Irrepressible)	2:55
7.	"Oh, The Vanity"	4:42
8.	"Lethargic Shift / The String That Passes Through All Things"	5:30
9.	"Moments We Lost" (featuring Susanne Sundfør)	5:25
10.	"Beacons" (featuring Susanne Sundfør)	6:36
11.	"Waiting Still" (featuring Astrid S)	4:18
12.	"We Remain Hidden / Consolation" (featuring Pixx)	6:59
13.	"Beyond Beyond / The Weathered Gate / The Head of the Statue"	4:10
14.	"I’m There with You"	3:37
15.	"Come with Me" (featuring Karen Harding)	6:33
16.	"The Veil"	4:23
17.	"Misconceptions / The Crux of It All" (featuring Astrid S)	3:06
18.	"The House of “R”"	7:13
19.	"If Only for a While" (featuring Susanne Sundfør)	4:10
20.	"Understanding the Inexplicable"	4:19
21.	"Reaching for Secrets" (featuring Maurissa Rose)	6:50
22.	"Dandelion Pleasantries"	4:36
23.	"Camera Obscura" (featuring Pixx)	4:56
24.	"Beside You" (featuring Jamie Irrepressible)	3:10
25.	"Always And Forever" (featuring Susanne Sundfør)	3:30
26.	"The Space Between Stars / Paramnesia"	5:49
27.	"Gone, Dissolved into the Night" (featuring Alison Goldfrapp)	5:50
28.	"Back Then, Back When"	3:25
29.	"All Things Passing"	3:45
30.	"And So..."	3:05

== Charts ==
Chart performance for Nebulous Nights (An Ambient Excursion into Profound Mysteries)
Chart (2026)	Peak position
Scottish Albums (Official Charts)	56
UK Albums Sales (OCC)	69
UK Independent Albums (Official Charts)	30
