= Profound Mysteries III =

Studio album by Röyksopp
- Released: 18 November 2022
- Length: 60:34
- Label: Dog Triumph
- Producer: Röyksopp

Röyksopp chronology
Profound Mysteries II (2022)	Profound Mysteries III (2022)	Nebulous Nights (An Ambient Excursion into Profound Mysteries) (2024)

Singles from Profound Mysteries III
- 1. "Speed King" Released: 30 August 2022; 2. "The Night" Released: 31 August 2022; 3. "Me&Youphoria" Released: 21 September 2022; 4. "Just Wanted to Know" Released: 18 October 2022; 5. "Feel It" Released: 19 October 2022; 6. "Stay Awhile" Released: 16 November 2022

Profound Mysteries III is the eighth studio album by Norwegian electronic music duo Röyksopp, and is the third and last album in the Profound Mysteries series of albums. The album was released on 18 November 2022. It was released with collections of short films (each by a different director) and animated visualizations (by artist Jonathan Zawada) created to accompany each track.

== Critical reception ==
Professional ratings
Aggregate scores
Source	Rating
Metacritic	71/100
Review scores
Source	Rating
Aftenposten	4/6
AllMusic	3.5/5 stars
Dagsavisen	6/6
The Daily Telegraph	4/5 stars
iTromsø	5/6
Jenesaispop	4/5 stars
NRK	4/6
Slant Magazine	3/5 stars

Profound Mysteries III received generally positive reviews from music critics. At Metacritic, which assigns a normalised rating out of 100 to reviews from mainstream publications, the album received an average score of 71, based on 5 reviews. Thomas Bedenbaugh of Slant Magazine stated that "Röyksopp concludes their Profound Mysteries trilogy with some of their most ambitious songs to date", and further noted that the track "Speed King" is the centerpiece of the album and described that "the song serves as the boldest and most memorable composition in the trilogy." NRK's Shana Fevang Mathai noted that the range of songs might require a "generous ear" to appreciate. Sebas E. Alonso of Jenesaispop praised "the fact that [Röyksopp] offers us something different in this storm of overwhelming news that the music world has become every Friday." Bernt Erik Pedersen of Dagsavisen described the tracks of the album as going "from dramatic heights to quiet introspection, from the low whispering to the grandly symphonic, with both orchestral strings and sweeping synth strings. At the same time, there is light and dewy synthpop [...] with Astrid S on Just Wanted To Know."

== Track listing ==
All tracks are written by Röyksopp, except where noted.

Profound Mysteries III track listing
No.	Title	Writer(s)	Length
1.	"So Ambiguous"	Röyksopp; Jamie Irrepressible	6:06
2.	"Me&Youphoria"	Röyksopp; Gunhild Ramsay Kovacs	4:40
3.	"Stay Awhile"	Röyksopp; Susanne Sundfør	6:11
4.	"The Night"	Röyksopp; Alison Goldfrapp	7:38
5.	"Lights Out"	Röyksopp; Pixx	5:28
6.	"Speed King"		9:53
7.	"The Next Day"	Röyksopp; Irrepressible	4:16
8.	"Just Wanted to Know"	Röyksopp; Astrid S	4:13
9.	"Feel It"	Röyksopp; Maurissa Rose	8:14
10.	"Like an Old Dog"	Röyksopp; Pixx	3:55
Total length:			60:34

=== Accompanying short films ===
Released between August and November 2022, alongside tracks from Profound Mysteries III.

Short films accompanying Profound Mysteries III
No.	Title	Director	Length
1.	"Paved Paradise"	Tess Quatri	1:09
2.	"How to"	Emilie Norenberg	1:03
3.	"Le Reve"	Bianca Poletti	2:34
4.	"A Crab & A Pipe"	Johan Stahl	2:27
5.	"In A Flash"	Anastasia Karkazis	2:02
6.	"speed_k1ng"	Markus Tangre	1:24
7.	"Cutting Cords"	Jenny Amdi Sørensen	1:02
8.	"Elegy"	Máté Boegi	1:47
9.	"Black Box"	Ola Jacob Nestande	1:34
10.	"Like An Old Dog"	Röyksopp	2:27
Total length:			17:29

== Charts ==
Chart performance for Profound Mysteries III
Chart (2022)	Peak position
Australian Digital Albums (ARIA)	11
Belgian Albums (Ultratop Flanders)	186
German Albums (Offizielle Top 100)	61
Norwegian Albums (VG-lista)	16
Scottish Albums (Official Charts)	62
Swiss Albums (Schweizer Hitparade)	25
UK Album Downloads (Official Charts)	12
UK Independent Albums (Official Charts)	16
