= Back to Mine: Röyksopp =

Mixtape by Röyksopp
- Released: 5 March 2007
- Genres: Electronic, funk, soul, rock
- Length: 72:27
- Label: DMC Publishing
- Producer: Röyksopp

Röyksopp chronology
Röyksopp's Night Out (2006)	Back to Mine: Röyksopp (2007)	Junior (2009)

Back to Mine chronology
Back to Mine: Mercury Rev (2006)	Back to Mine: Röyksopp (2007)	Back to Mine: Bugz in the Attic (2007)

Back to Mine: Röyksopp is a compilation album from the Back to Mine series from DMC Publishing. It was compiled and mixed by the Norwegian electronica band Röyksopp. Album cover art was by artist Tommy Penton.

== Reception ==
Professional ratings
Review scores
Source	Rating
AllMusic	4.5/5 stars
DMC World Magazine	5/5 stars
Verdens Gang	5/6 stars
Nordlys	5/6 stars

Allmusic rated the compilation album four and a half out of five stars.

== Track listing ==
No.	Title	Artist	Length
1.	"Born Under Punches (The Heat Goes On)"	Talking Heads	3:34
2.	"Sphinx"	Harry Thumann	2:33
3.	"One More Round"	Kasso	2:35
4.	"Ma Quale Idea"	Pino D'Angiò	3:54
5.	"Above and Beyond"	Edgar Winter	1:38
6.	"Off Side"	Ray Mang	1:37
7.	"Take a Chance"	Mr Flagio	4:22
8.	"Platinum" (Part Three - Charleston)	Mike Oldfield	1:20
9.	"Meatball" (This track is a remix of Platinum (Part Four-North Star) by Mike Oldfield)	Emmanuel Splice (a Röyksopp pseudonym)	2:53
10.	"That's Hot"	Jesse G	4:25
11.	"Legs"	Art of Noise	2:52
12.	"3A.M. (12" Version)"	I-Level	1:49
13.	"Dirty Talk"	Klein + M.B.O.	3:08
14.	"It Ain't Easy"	Supermax	4:03
15.	"Could Heaven Ever Be Like This"	Idris Muhammad	8:26
16.	"Night People" (New York Club Mix)	Guy Dalton	4:07
17.	"Get Closer"	Valerie Dore	4:55
18.	"Can't Be Serious" (Vocal)	Ginny	5:12
19.	"I'm Never Gonna Tell It"	Funkadelic	3:24
20.	"It's Been a Long Time"	The New Birth	5:40
Total length:			72:27

== Charts ==
Chart (2007)	Peak position
Norwegian Albums (VG-lista)	24
