= Reuben Sutherland =

Reuben Sutherland is a New Zealander who lives in Britain. He is a VJ, director and visual artist, specialising in mixing up live action and animation.

Sutherland has made music videos for The Doves, Phoenix Foundation and Röyksopp (their single Happy Up Here). He also created videos for the New Zealand-based independent record label Flying Nun Records. He has directed various TV commercials through the production company Joyrider.

Together with noise artist Dan Hayhurst, Sutherland formed Sculpture, a visual and musical group which does live zoetrope-video art performances with a record player and a camera. Hayhurst plays improvised music with tape loops and effects equipment. Sculpture has performed in festivals and clubs in Europe, among which ATP was one.

Works of Sutherland are being included in the tenth anniversary documentary about the All Tomorrow's Party Festival, published by Warp Records.

Sutherland has directed commercials for Adidas, Smirnoff, IKEA, T-Mobile, Orange.

== Releases ==
- Sculpture - Sculpture, DVD with animations
