= Star Wars Headspace =

Compilation album by Various artists
- Released: February 19, 2016
- Genre: Electronic
- Length: 1:05:49
- Labels: Hollywood; American Recordings
- Producers: Rick Rubin (exec.); Kevin Kusatsu (exec.); various (see track listing and credits)

Singles from Star Wars Headspace
- 1. "Cantina Boys" Released: February 8, 2016; 2. "NR-G7" Released: February 8, 2016; 3. "R2 Where R U?" Released: February 8, 2016; 4. "Help Me" Released: February 9, 2016; 5. "Force" Released: February 18, 2016

Star Wars Headspace is an electronic music compilation album executively produced by Rick Rubin and Kevin Kusatsu. It compiles electronic dance tracks of acts including Claude VonStroke, Flying Lotus and Röyksopp. It featured sound effects and dialog from the Star Wars films, but does not contain any of John Williams' music for the series.

Hollywood Records and American Recordings released Star Wars Headspace in digital forms on February 19, 2016, and in physical forms on March 18, to decent commercial performance, beginning at number one on the United States Billboard Dance/Electronic Albums chart and becoming the second various artists compilation to top the chart. However, it also garnered a mixed response from music critics, praise going towards its eccentric concept and criticism that it would likely only be enjoyed by fans of the film series.

== Composition ==
Star Wars Headspace is a compilation album of electronic dance music featuring sound effects and samples from the Star Wars films. Musicians Rick Rubin and Kevin Kusatsu, who executively produced the album, gave the producers files of these sounds, but were also instructed by Lucasfilm to not sample any of John Williams' score from the films. Flying Lotus, who said that he was proud of being a part of the project, felt that the concept made sense given that the sounds used in the Star Wars would be a precursor of what was yet to come in electronic music. Therefore, he felt "close" to the sounds he was using to reflect the universe of the films.

Critic Jonah Bromwich analyzed that the beginning half of Star Wars Headspace consists of the producers sampling from the movie while making music in their common style, making it feel like "obvious tribute material". The first track, Kaskade's "C-3P0's Plight", represents Star Wars' humor and C-3PO's melodramatic character aspect, featuring sounds of Wookiee's roar and shots from a Blaster weapon. Rubin's Trap remix of "Jabba Flow", a composition by J. J. Abrams and Lin-Manuel Miranda used in Star Wars: The Force Awakens, is the fifth track on the compilation, which is followed by Claude VonStroke's "R2 Knows", featuring vocals from Barry Drift and described in a review by Pitchfork Media as a silly anthem similar to releases from Todd Terje. Another track by Rubin, "NR-G7", has many samples such as R2-D2 blips playing over a "driving" four on the floor instrumental with "dazzling jet-stream" synthesizers. However, Bromwich also wrote that the later songs on the track list focus less on the artists making music in their typical trend and more on replicating what made John Williams score so great. Consequence of Sound's Derek Staples noted Norwegian duo Röyksopp's “Bounty Hunters” to be less of a bright song and more of a dark synthwave track than their usual material. "Sunset Over Manaan" by Attlas, a producer signed under the label mau5trap, has a melody reminiscent of Williams' "Leia's Theme", and has a more "cinematic" atmosphere than his previous work. The record closes with "Star Tripper" by French producer Breakbot, a downtempo funk song featuring orchestration reflecting the neo-romantic aspect of Williams' soundtrack.

== Promotion and release ==
On February 8, 2016, the release date and cover art of Star Wars Headspace was announced, and pre-ordering of the record began. That same day, Beats 1, an Apple Music radio show by New Zealand DJ and producer Zane Lowe, promoted the compilation with an interview with Flying Lotus about his involvement, as well as premiering three tracks, "Cantina Boys", "NR-G7" and "R2 Where R U?"; the latter song was a "World Record" premiere. "Help Me!" was released on Beats 1 a day later, while on February 18 the channel Freeform premiered "Force" shortly before the album's midnight release. Hollywood Records issued the album in digital form on February 19, 2016, followed by a physical release on March 18. Selling 3,000 copies in the United States on its first Billboard chart week, Star Wars Headspace topped the Dance/Electronic Albums chart, the first various artists compilation to do so on the chart since 2008's High School Musical 2: Non-Stop Dance Party. It also landed at number 197 on the nation's Billboard 200 and at number eight on the magazine's Compilation Albums chart. In the United Kingdom, the album landed on the Official Charts Company's UK Dance Albums Charts at number twenty and number twenty-two on the Official Charts Company's Soundtrack Albums Chart.

== Critical reception ==
Professional ratings
Aggregate scores
Source	Rating
Metacritic	48/100
Review scores
Source	Rating
AllMusic	2.5/5 stars
Consequence of Sound	C-
Pitchfork	6.9/10
Rolling Stone	2.5/5 stars
Tiny Mix Tapes	1/5 stars

Critical response to Star Wars Headspace was mixed, holding a weighted mean of a 48 out of 100 on the site Metacritic based on seven reviews. Drew Mcweeny reviewed it for One Thing I Love Today, his daily column on HitFix which is meant to highlight certain aspects of modern-day popular culture. He honored the compilation's concept of an EDM Star Wars tribute as funny: "I'm not sure how long I'll listen to it, because in the end, it's still an hour or so of EDM, but it was a delightful soundtrack to a busy weekend, and all of the small surprises built into it should make it something that any Star Wars fan will be able to easily enjoy." A correspondent for The Boston Globe wrote that it was much better than he expected it to be, giving all credit to the producers who contributed to the compilation. Los Angeles Times critic Randall Roberts spotlighted the distinguishing characteristic of each song. Bromwich, who wrote a review for Pitchfork, scored the release a 6.9 out of ten, highlighting the record's goal of just being "simple fun" and "Neither [a] stale tribute nor sloppy lovefest". At the same time, however, he also disliked that the nostalgic style was seemingly "a way of avoiding risk".

The album also garnered numerous mixed reviews that felt that it would only be enjoyed by fans of the franchise; Staples described the tracks as "musical fan fiction ready for both celestial dance floors and distant forgotten landscapes", while Jon Dolan, reviewing for Rolling Stone magazine, rated it two and a half stars out of five, feeling that many of the producers involved with the project didn't experiment enough with the concept that it was "hard to get beyond timid fanboy reverence." The harshest review came from Sam Goldner of Tiny Mix Tapes, who bashed the album as a major contributing factor to "the nasty details, the blemishes, the facts of this world that truly corrupt our collective sense of well-being and hope" in regards to how the Star Wars franchise has been marketed.

== Track listing and credits ==
All tracks mastered by Vlado Meller with assistance from Jeremy Lubsey.

Star Wars Headspace – Standard version
No.	Title	Writer(s)	Artist/Producer	Length
1.	"C-3P0's Plight"	Ryan Raddon, Finn Bjarnson	Kaskade	3:12
2.	"Help Me!"	Julio Mejia, Matthew Toth	Good Times Ahead	3:55
3.	"Force"	TroyBoi	TroyBoi	2:51
4.	"Cantina Boys"	Harrison Rodrigues	Baauer	2:47
5.	"Jabba Flow" (featuring A-Trak) (Rick Rubin re-work)	J. J. Abrams, Lin-Manuel Miranda	Shag Kava	3:56
6.	"R2 Knows" (featuring Barry Drift)	Claude VonStroke,	Claude VonStroke	6:12
7.	"NR-G7"	Rick Rubin, Jason Lader	Rick Rubin	5:17
8.	"Ghomrassen"	Simon Green	Bonobo	5:10
9.	"Bounty Hunters"	Svein Berge, Torbjørn Brundtland	Röyksopp	8:12
10.	"Sunset Over Manaan"	Jeffrey Hartford	Attlas	5:09
11.	"R2 Where R U?"	Steven Ellison	Flying Lotus	3:02
12.	"Druid Caravan of Smoke"	Henry Laufer	Shlohmo	4:43
13.	"EWOK PUMPP"	Rustie	Rustie	2:28
14.	"Scruffy-Looking Nerfherder"	Christian Karlsson, Linus Eklöw, Tony Senghore	Galantis, Tony Senghore^{[a]}	4:18
15.	"Star Tripper"	Thibaut Berland, David Berland	Breakbot, David Berland^{[a]}	4:37
Total length:				1:05:49

Notes

- ^{^[a]} signifies an additional producer not credited as the main artist

== Charts ==
Chart (2016)	Peak position
UK Dance Albums (OCC)	20
UK Soundtrack Albums (OCC)	22
US Billboard 200	180
US Compilation Albums (Billboard)	8
US Dance/Electronic Albums (Billboard)	1
