= Profound Mysteries II =

Studio album by Röyksopp
- Released: 19 August 2022
- Genres: Electropop; electronica; trip hop; ambient; dance
- Length: 51:26
- Label: Dog Triumph
- Producer: Röyksopp

Röyksopp chronology
Profound Mysteries (2022)	Profound Mysteries II (2022)	Profound Mysteries III (2022)

Singles from Profound Mysteries II
- 1. "Sorry" Released: 14 June 2022; 2. "Unity" Released: 15 June 2022; 3. "Control" Released: 26 July 2022; 4. "Let's Get It Right" Released: 27 July 2022; 5. "Oh, Lover" Released: 17 August 2022

Profound Mysteries II is the seventh studio album by Norwegian electronic music duo Röyksopp, released on 19 August 2022. It is the second of three albums in the Profound Mysteries series of albums. It was released with collections of short films (each by a different director) and animated visualizations (by artist Jonathan Zawada) created to accompany each track.

== Background and development ==
In an interview with NME Svein Berge stated that "We are focussing on what we call the mystery – it’s rather pompous, I know," "We even added profound to turn up the nobhead-hood of it all! But anyway, the thing with part two in particular is that with this one, we point to the inspirational genres and artists who helped to forge us when we were kids." He further commented that those with a keen ear will notice heavy references to other artists like Kraftwerk and Depeche Mode, and also genres like Italo Disco and '90s UK rave. It's something they've always used in their music, but that this time it's more strident. He said that "It’s meant as a tribute, not a rip-off."

== Critical reception ==
Professional ratings
Review scores
Source	Rating
Aftenposten	4/6
AllMusic	4/5 stars
Bergens tidende	4/6 hearts
NME	4/5 stars
Pitchfork	5.5/10
VG	4/6

Profound Mysteries II received critical acclaim from music critics. Eivind August of Aftenposten stated that the album has "Driving bass lines, slowly building rhythms and of course dreamy synth lines. This is Röyksopp as we know them, but with enough innovation that they don't just float on nostalgia." Joakim Randa of Bergens tidende noted that "Especially in its first half, Profound Mysteries II almost sounds like the debut album Melody A.M., but from an alternative universe." and further stated that the track It Was A Good Thing is "a truly beautiful piece of pop music and clearly the best track on the album. The production is restrained, with simple, almost resigned motifs". Timothy Monger of AllMusic described that "Musically, [Röyksopp] continue to subtly expand their signature mix of lush downbeat drama and clever electropop, getting cinematic and darkly funked-out, sometimes in the same song" and that the album is "as satisfying as its predecessor", and that it "is yet another quality entry in Röyksopp's already sterling canon." Marius Asp of Verdens gang stated that the album "gets even better with [the track] Let's Get It Right, [...] - a smooth pop melody that benefits enormously from a warm, organic and intimate soundscape." and commented that the track Unity "is lifted to heaven by euphoric house piano, breakbeats and a powerful singing performance from British Karen Harding."

== Track listing ==
All tracks are written by Röyksopp, except where noted.

No.	Title	Writer(s)	Length
1.	"Denimclad Baboons"		3:43
2.	"Let's Get It Right"	Röyksopp; Astrid S	5:05
3.	"Unity"	Röyksopp; Karen Harding	5:04
4.	"Oh, Lover"	Röyksopp; Susanne Sundfør	6:13
5.	"Sorry"	Röyksopp; Jamie Irrepressible	4:59
6.	"Control"		6:13
7.	"It Was a Good Thing"	Röyksopp; Pixx	4:12
8.	"Remembering the Departed"		3:49
9.	"Tell Him"	Röyksopp; Susanne Sundfør	5:26
10.	"Some Resolve"		6:42
Total length:			51:26

=== Accompanying short films ===
Released between June and August 2022, alongside tracks from Profound Mysteries II.

No.	Title	Director	Length
1.	"This is Mæh"	Bine Bach	1:43
2.	"Resignation"	Holger Karberg	1:23
3.	"Good Human"	Øyvind Holtman	1:07
4.	"Therapy"	Jeppe Rønde	1:59
5.	"Past"	Jeppe Lange	2:02
6.	"Frenship"	Ada Bligaard Søby	1:05
7.	"Tease"	Emilie Thalund	1:44
8.	"Dreamweaver"	Andreas J. Riiser	0:54
9.	"Washed Ashore"	Andrea Eckerbom	0:53
10.	"Alfons"	Jakob Marky	0:52
Total length:			13:42

== Charts ==
Chart performance for Profound Mysteries II
Chart (2022)	Peak position
Australian Digital Albums (ARIA)	19
German Albums (Offizielle Top 100)	91
Norwegian Albums (VG-lista)	35
Scottish Albums (Official Charts)	25
Swiss Albums (Schweizer Hitparade)	31
UK Dance Albums (Official Charts)	2
UK Album Downloads (Official Charts)	12
UK Independent Albums (Official Charts)	8
