= Do It Again (Röyksopp and Robyn song) =

Single by Röyksopp and Robyn

from the EP Do It Again
- Released: 28 April 2014
- Genre: Electropop
- Length: 5:06
- Label: Dog Triumph; Wall of Sound; Cooking Vinyl
- Songwriters: Röyksopp; Robyn
- Producers: Röyksopp; Robyn

Röyksopp singles chronology
"Twenty Thirteen" (2014)	"Do It Again" (2014)	"Sayit" (2014)

Robyn singles chronology
"Never Will Be Mine" (2011)	"Do It Again" (2014)	"Sayit" (2014)

Music video
- "Do It Again" on YouTube

"Do It Again" is a song by Norwegian electronic music duo Röyksopp and Swedish singer Robyn from their extended play of the same name (2014). It was released digitally on 28 April 2014 as the EP's lead single. A remix bundle was released exclusively on Beatport on 26 May 2014. The music video, directed by Martin de Thurah, was filmed over three days in four Mexican states—Mexico City, Veracruz, Puebla and Hidalgo—and premiered on 21 July 2014.

The song ranks as Robyn's seventh biggest track, with 3.45 million audio streams and 48,000 downloads in the United Kingdom.

== Track listing ==
- Beatport digital download
1. "Do It Again" (Deniz Koyu Remix) – 5:46
2. "Do It Again" (Moullinex Remix) – 6:36
3. "Do It Again" (Moullinex Dub) – 6:37
4. "Do It Again" (Moby Basement Mix) – 7:35
5. "Do It Again" (Röyksopp & Robyn vs. Moby Mix) – 6:56
6. "Do It Again" (Issac Christopher Remix) – 5:55
7. "Do It Again" (Patrick Pache Remix) – 5:38

== Charts ==
=== Weekly charts ===
Chart (2014)	Peak position
Australia (ARIA)	99
Belgium (Ultratip Bubbling Under Flanders)	2
Belgium (Ultratip Bubbling Under Wallonia)	35
Denmark (Tracklisten)	18
France (SNEP)	117
Ireland (IRMA)	91
Netherlands (Single Top 100)	65
Sweden (Sverigetopplistan)	16
UK Singles (Official Charts)	75
UK Dance (Official Charts)	21
UK Indie (Official Charts)	3
US Dance Club Songs (Billboard)	1
US Hot Dance/Electronic Songs (Billboard)	16

=== Year-end charts ===
Chart (2014)	Position
Sweden (Sverigetopplistan)	100
US Dance Club Songs (Billboard)	2
US Hot Dance/Electronic Songs (Billboard)	53

== See also ==
- List of number-one dance singles of 2014 (U.S.)
