= Late Night Tales: Röyksopp =

- Cover photography by Peter Ashworth

Compilation album by Röyksopp
- Released: 14 June 2013
- Genre: Electronic
- Length: 92:24
- Label: Night Time Stories
- Producer: Svein Berge, Torbjørn Brundtland
- Compiler: Svein Berge, Torbjørn Brundtland

Röyksopp chronology
Senior (2010)	Late Night Tales: Röyksopp (2013)	Do It Again (2014)

Late Night Tales chronology
Late Night Tales Presents After Dark (2013)	Late Night Tales: Röyksopp (2013)	Late Night Tales: Bonobo (2013)

Late Night Tales: Röyksopp is a mix album compiled by Norwegian electronic music duo Röyksopp. It was released on 14 June 2013 as part of the Late Night Tales series. The mix includes tracks from artists such as Vangelis, XTC, F. R. David, Tuxedomoon and Thomas Dolby. It also features an exclusive new Röyksopp track titled "Daddy's Groove" and the studio version of their cover of Depeche Mode's song "Ice Machine".

== Critical reception ==
Professional ratings
Aggregate scores
Source	Rating
Metacritic	75
Review scores
Source	Rating
AllMusic	3.5/5 stars
Fædrelandsvennen	4/6
Mixmag	5/5
Pitchfork	7.4/10
VG	4/6

Late Night Tales: Röyksopp received critical acclaim from music critics. At Metacritic, which assigns a normalised rating out of 100 to reviews from mainstream publications, the album received an average score of 75, based on 4 reviews, indicating "generally favorable reviews".

Jason Lymangrover of AllMusic commented that "Röyksopp's contribution [to the Late Night Tales series] showcases the Norwegian duo's love of analog synthesizer tones. The album's 19 tracks weave an icy, cinematic narrative". Roy Søbstad of Fædrelandsvennen noted that "The selection [of songs] is as catchy as it is eclectic, and is equally suitable for both after parties and music nerds." Ned Raggett of Pitchfork stated that "There's a sweetly consistent mood throughout [the album]; it’s something you can put on and treat as ambient sound, but there’s also a clever subtlety in their process."

== Track listing ==
No.	Title	Artist(s)	Length
1.	"Daddy's Groove"	Röyksopp	3:08
2.	"Passing Through"	Rare Bird	4:26
3.	"Light of Day"	Little River Band	8:02
4.	"In a Manner of Speaking"	Tuxedomoon	3:30
5.	"Blade Runner Blues"	Vangelis	8:54
6.	"Ice Machine" (Godlike Edit)	Röyksopp featuring Susanne Sundfør	3:39
7.	"Odi et Amo"	Jóhann Jóhannsson	3:12
8.	"Music"	F. R. David	3:25
9.	"After the Goldrush"	Prelude	2:07
10.	"Hello Beach Girls"	Richard Schneider Jr.	6:09
11.	"Stranger on the Shore"	Acker Bilk	2:45
12.	"Budapest by Blimp"	Thomas Dolby	8:37
13.	"Love You Out of Your Mind"	Byrne & Barnes	3:21
14.	"Hands and Clouds"	Andreas Vollenweider	2:39
15.	"Small Hours"	John Martyn	8:44
16.	"The Somnabulist"	XTC	4:36
17.	"'Til I Gain Control"	This Mortal Coil	4:33
18.	"Aguirre I Lacrime di Rei"	Popol Vuh	6:17
19.	"Flat of Angles (Part 2)"	Benedict Cumberbatch	4:20

== Personnel ==
Credits adapted from the liner notes of Late Night Tales: Röyksopp.

- Röyksopp – DJ mix
- Peter Ashworth – cover photography
- Paul Morris – mastering
- The Reptile House – design

== Release history ==
Region	Date	Label	Format(s)
Germany	14 June 2013	Late Night Tales	CD, LP, digital download
Finland	14 June 2013	Late Night Tales	Digital download
Norway	14 June 2013	Late Night Tales	Digital download
Japan	16 June 2013	Late Night Tales	Digital download
United Kingdom	16 June 2013	Late Night Tales	Digital download
Denmark	17 June 2013	Late Night Tales	Digital download
France	17 June 2013	Late Night Tales	CD, LP, digital download
Sweden	17 June 2013	Late Night Tales	Digital download
United Kingdom	17 June 2013	Late Night Tales	CD, LP
Italy	18 June 2013	Late Night Tales	CD
United States	18 June 2013	Late Night Tales	Digital download
United States	25 June 2013	Late Night Tales	CD, LP
Australia	5 July 2013	Late Night Tales	CD

== Charts ==
Chart (2013)	Peak position
Norwegian Albums (VG-lista)	8
