= Röyksopp =

Norwegian electronic music duo

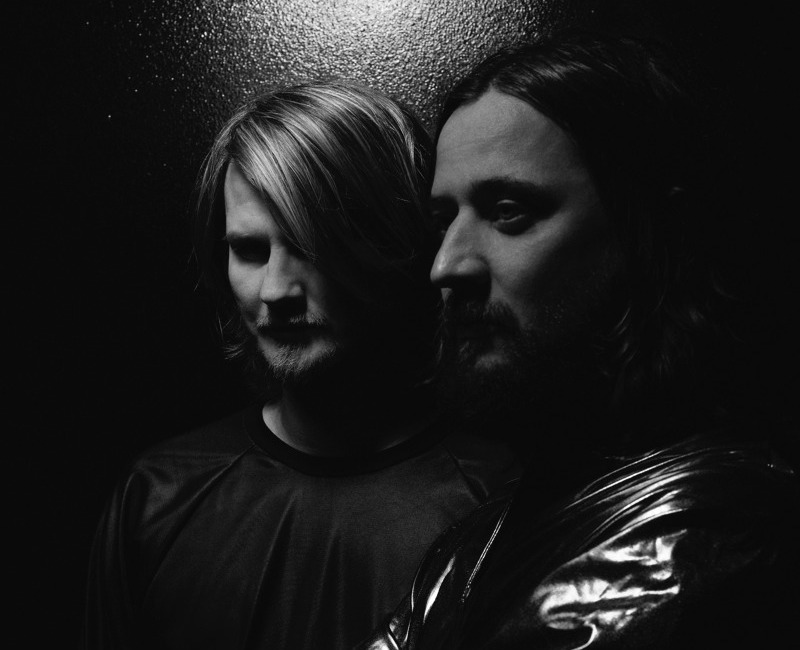
- Röyksopp in 2014: Torbjørn Brundtland (left) and Svein Berge (right)

Background information
- Also known as: Emmanuel Splice, RYXP
- Origin: Tromsø, Troms, Norway
- Genres: Electronic; ambient; downtempo; chill-out; house; synth-pop
- Years active: 1998–present
- Labels: Tellé; Wall of Sound; Virgin; Astralwerks; Dog Triumph; Cooking Vinyl; Cherrytree; Interscope
- Members: Svein Berge; Torbjørn Brundtland
- Website: royksopp.com

Röyksopp (Norwegian pronunciation: [ˈrœ̂ʏksɔp]) are a Norwegian electronic music duo from Tromsø formed in 1998. The duo consists of childhood friends Svein Berge and Torbjørn Brundtland, who formed Röyksopp during the Bergen Wave. After experimenting with different genres of electronic music, the band solidified their place in the electronica scene with their 2001 debut album, Melody A.M., released on the Wall of Sound record label.

Röyksopp has consistently experimented with various electronic music genres, including ambient, house music, and synth-pop. The band is also known for its elaborate concert performances, which feature eccentric outfits.

Röyksopp has been nominated for two Grammy Awards, won seven Spellemannprisen awards, performed worldwide tours, and produced albums that have topped the charts in several countries.

== Band name ==
Røyksopp literally means "smoke mushroom". It is the Norwegian word for the class of mushrooms known as puffball. The band's name replaces the second letter (ø) with ö, which is non-existent in the Norwegian alphabet but corresponds to the same sound in the Swedish alphabet.

== History ==
=== 1990–1997: Origins ===
Berge and Brundtland were introduced to each other through a mutual friend in Tromsø, Norway, when Berge was 12 years old and Brundtland was 13. They enjoyed the same films and music, and shared an interest in electronics. The two began playing music together due to a shared interest in electronica, and experimented with various forms of electronic music. They bought a drum machine together, part of the Tromsø techno scene of the early 1990s. Their childhood in Tromsø and the natural scenery of Northern Norway have been mentioned as some of their most important inspirations. The pair separated before obtaining any popular success with their music, but reunited with each other in 1998 in Bergen, Norway.

In the 1990s, Bergen had overtaken Tromsø's position as the most vital scene for underground electronic music in Norway, and Röyksopp worked with other Norwegian musicians like Frost, Those Norwegians, Drum Island, and Kings of Convenience's guitarist and singer Erlend Øye in what was called the Bergen Wave. During this time, the duo befriended Geir Jenssen. Under the tutelage of Jenssen, the duo started a band called Aedena Cycle with Gaute Barlindhaug and Kolbjørn Lyslo. In 1994. Aedena Cycle recorded an EP called Traveler's Dreams, which was released under the R&S Records sublabel Apollo. Jenssen almost convinced the band to sign a full record deal with Apollo Records after its release.

=== 1998–2000: Early years ===
After recording as part of Aedena Cycle, Berge and Brundtland left the group to form Röyksopp. The word röyksopp is a stylized version of the Norwegian word for the puffball mushroom, "røyksopp". The band has stated that the word could also evoke the mushroom cloud resulting from an atomic blast.

Röyksopp's debut single was released by local Bergen Wave-era independent label Tellé. Röyksopp's first single "So Easy" was the second record released by Tellé. It became popular in the UK market after it was used in a UK T-Mobile advertisement. It was later re-released with "Remind Me".

=== 2001–2004: Melody A.M. and early success ===
"Eple"
30-second sample of "Eple" from Röyksopp's 2001 album Melody A.M.

After leaving Tellé, the band signed with British label Wall of Sound and released Melody A.M., which became certified platinum in the band's native Norway and sold over a million copies worldwide. The album peaked at number one in Norway, and produced the UK Top 40 singles "Eple", "Poor Leno", and "Remind Me". A final single, "Sparks", was also released.

"Eple" (Norwegian for apple) was used as part of the "Welcome" intro video played on the first-time start-up of Apple's Mac OS X Panther operating system in 2003.

The band's popularity was boosted by several graphically experimental music videos, many of which were put into heavy rotation by MTV. The music video for "Remind Me", featuring an infographic-style video by French company H5, won the 2002 MTV Europe Music Award for best music video. The duo was also nominated in three more categories: "Best Nordic Act", "Best New Artist", and "Best Dance Act". The duo performed the song "Poor Leno" at the event. One year later they received a nomination for "Best Group" at the Brit Awards.

During this period, Röyksopp slowly gained popularity in the United States. "Remind Me", a collaboration with Erlend Øye, was featured in a Geico car insurance commercial, the fourth of the "It's so easy a caveman could do it" ads.

Röyksopp were approached to compose the soundtrack for The Matrix Reloaded but declined the offer.

Their song "Poor Leno" was featured in the EA Sports BIG snowboarding game SSX 3.

=== 2005–2008: The Understanding ===
Röyksopp's second studio album, The Understanding, was released on 12 July 2005. It was preceded with the album's single "Only This Moment" on 27 June 2005. The single peaked at number 33 in the United Kingdom. The video for "Only This Moment" is based on the events of the Paris 1968 riots with elements of propaganda found throughout it. The album's second single, "49 Percent", featuring Chelonis R. Jones, was released on 26 September 2005. A third single, "What Else Is There?", featuring vocals from Swedish singer Karin Dreijer of The Knife, became the album's biggest single, peaking at number 32 in the United Kingdom, and at number four in Norway. "Beautiful Day Without You" was the album's fourth single, and a non-album track, "Curves", was also released.

The album peaked at number one in Norway, and at number 13 in the UK. During this time, Röyksopp's popularity continued to increase in the United States. The album charted on many Billboard charts, and peaked at number two on the Top Electronic Albums chart, number 22 on the Top Heatseekers chart, and number 32 on the Top Independent Albums.

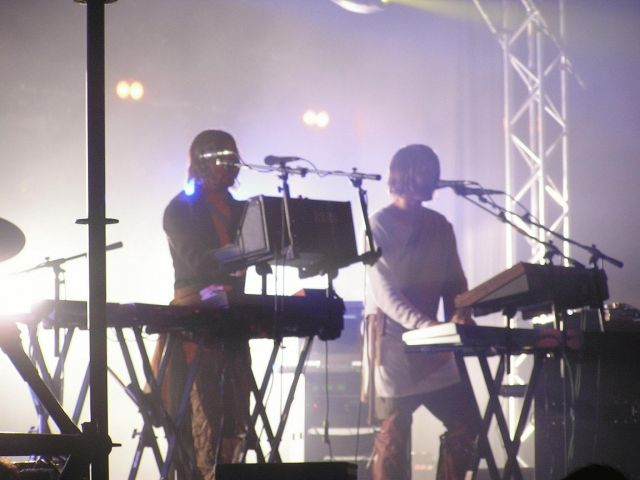
Röyksopp performing at Fuji Rock, Niigata, Japan, in 2005

After the release of The Understanding, some of Röyksopp's singles were licensed for use in movies. "What Else Is There?" was featured in the 2007 American film Meet Bill and during the end credits of the 2006 British film Cashback, and "Circuit Breaker" was used in the 2007 snowboard film Picture This.

On 19 June 2006, Röyksopp released a nine-track live album called Röyksopp's Night Out. The album contains a reinterpretation of the song "Go with the Flow" by Queens of the Stone Age.

On 5 March 2007, Röyksopp compiled their favourite tracks by other artists for the Back to Mine series. Called Back to Mine: Röyksopp, the album was released in the US on 5 March 2007, and in the UK on 27 April 2007. The album also includes their own track "Meatball", released under the pseudonym "Emmanuel Splice". Svein Berge also contributed as a board member for the celebration of the Grieg year, as Norway celebrated their famous composer Edvard Grieg.

On the tenth anniversary of Röyksopp's formation—15 December 2008—the band released a new track, "Happy Birthday", free of charge to celebrate the event. The song was released via free streaming on the band's website.

=== 2009–2012: Junior and Senior ===
Röyksopp's third studio album, Junior, was released on 23 March 2009, featuring the single "Happy Up Here". The song debuted on BBC Radio 1's Pete Tong show on 9 January 2009. It was officially released on 16 March 2009. The music video for "Happy Up Here", made by Reuben Sutherland, features elements from the arcade game Space Invaders. The single and music video were met with positive reactions from the press and fans.

"The Girl and the Robot", the second single from the album Junior, featuring vocals from Swedish singer Robyn, was released on 15 June 2009. The vinyl and digital versions of the single included remixes of the song by Kris Menace, Chateau Marmont, and Spencer & Hill. The Jean Elan remix of "The Girl and the Robot" was nominated for Best Remixed Recording, Non-Classical for the 52nd Grammy Awards. "This Must Be It" is the third single from the album, including vocals from Swedish singer Karin Dreijer of The Knife and Fever Ray. The single also features remixes by Thin White Duke, LehtMoJoe, Rex the Dog, and Apparat, among others. The band later released the stems for the song "Tricky Tricky" as part of a remix competition, and the winning entries were released on 27 October 2009.

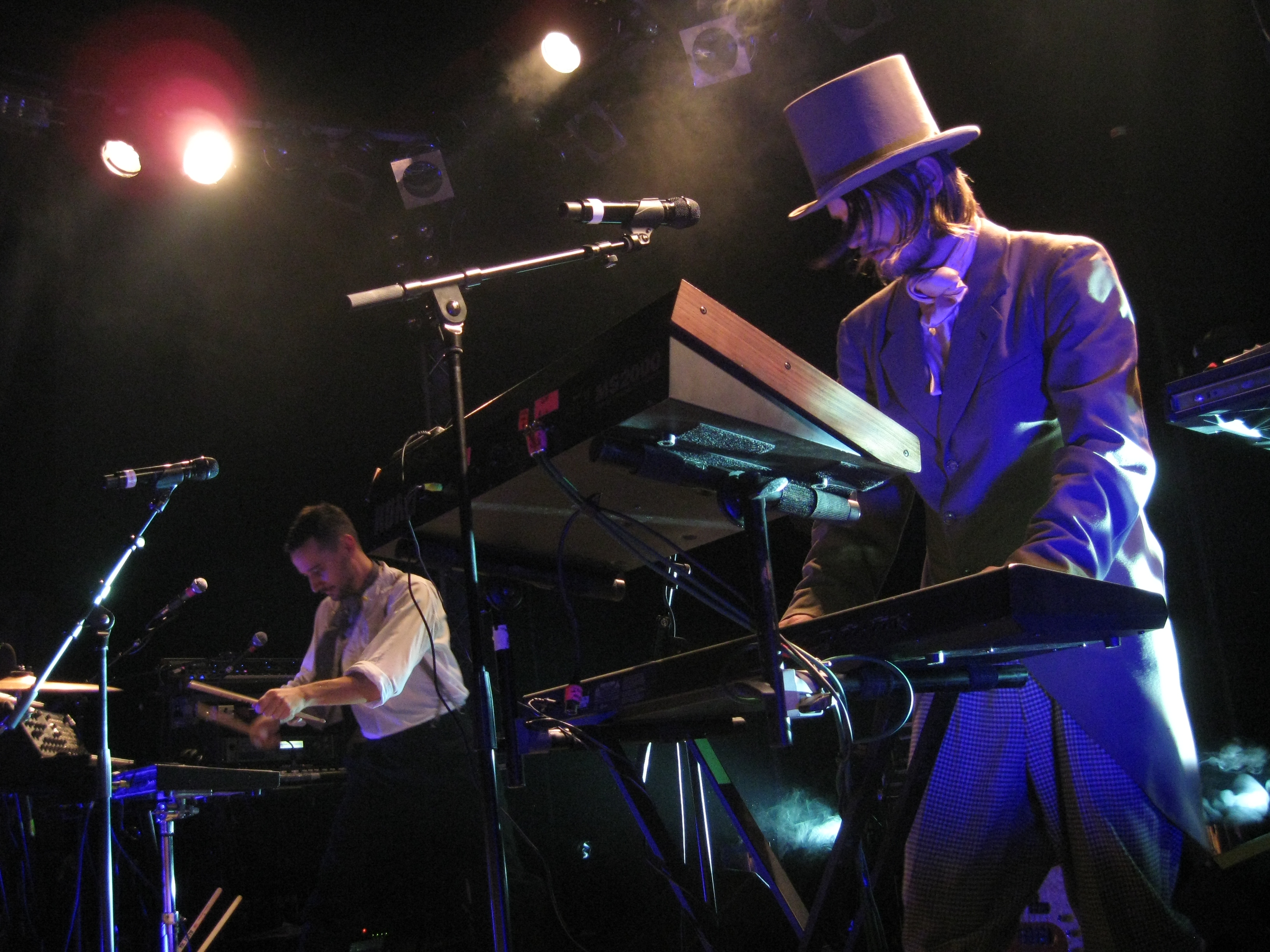
Röyksopp performing in Berlin on 7 April 2009

The album peaked at number one in Norway, the band's third consecutive release to do so. Junior also peaked at number 21 on the UK Albums Chart and charted on many Billboard charts, including the Billboard 200–the first Röyksopp release to do so–where it peaked at number 126. The album also peaked at number four on the Top Electronic Albums chart and number two on the Top Heatseekers chart.

Junior was followed by Senior, which is more quiet, "withdrawn and introspective" and "create[s] an atmosphere and an ambiance". Senior is the duo's first album to consist solely of instrumental tracks. The first single from the album, "The Drug", was released on 9 August 2010. The album itself was released on 13 September 2010, and was successful in the band's native Norway, peaking at number one, the band's fourth consecutive release to do so.

=== 2013–2018: Do It Again, The Inevitable End and Star Wars Headspace ===
In January 2013, Röyksopp released a song called "Running to the Sea", a collaboration with Norwegian artist Susanne Sundfør. According to the band, the song was written and recorded in two days for a televised performance. The single was released on 16 December 2013, with a B-side containing a song called "Something in My Heart", featuring Jamie McDermott from The Irrepressibles. Röyksopp and Sundfør also collaborated in creating a cover version of Depeche Mode's "Ice Machine" for their Late Night Tales compilation album, Late Night Tales: Röyksopp.

On 14 April 2014, Röyksopp announced a collaborative EP with Robyn titled Do It Again to coincide with their joint tour. A snippet of one of the five tracks set to be released on the album, "Monument", was released the same day. The album was released on 26 May through Dog Triumph, Wall of Sound, and Cooking Vinyl. The duo stated that a re-worked version of "Monument" would form a part of their next album. On 29 September 2014, Röyksopp announced that their next album, titled The Inevitable End, would explore "darker subject matter with emphasis on the lyrical content", and would be their last LP, though they will not stop making music. The album was released on 7 November 2014 by Dog Triumph. The special edition of the album includes new versions of the previously released tracks "Running to the Sea", "Do It Again" and "Monument" as well as the original version of "Something in My Heart". Some singles did precede the release of the album: "Skulls", "Sordid Affair" and the new version of "Monument". "Skulls" and "Monument" were accompanied by two new video clips. The video for "I Had This Thing" was shared on 11 May 2015.

In early 2015, it was announced that the band had composed a musical accompaniment to a comedic work based upon the novels of Franz Kafka. The project debuted at the Bergen International Festival in the same year. Also in 2015, the Norwegian public broadcaster NRK introduced a series of new jingles by Röyksopp for the TV output of the NRK Nyheter news division, as part of a comprehensive redesign of the sub-brand. The same year, they won the award for "Best Cinematography" at the Berlin Music Video Awards for their "Skulls" music video.

On 8 February 2016, Röyksopp announced that a new track titled "Bounty Hunters" would be included on the Star Wars Headspace compilation. The album was released on 19 February 2016. On 9 September 2016, Röyksopp released a new song, in collaboration with Susanne Sundfør, called "Never Ever". Additional remixes of the song have been released between February and April 2017, including Röyksopp's own club mix.

=== 2019–2021: Lost Tapes ===
In February 2019, the band announced that they would be releasing B-sides, exclusives and previously unreleased tracks through the Lost Tapes playlist, starting with "I Wanna Know" and "Rising Urge". The tracks have been released for free on music streaming services, including Spotify and YouTube, but are also sold in digital stores like Amazon and the iTunes Store. In August 2019, Röyksopp released a collaborative single with Lars Vaular, called "To minutter". The band kept releasing new Lost Tapes until 25 January 2021, when they announced the project has come to a halt for the time being. In August 2021, the physical edition of Lost Tapes was announced for release on 17 September 2021. It contains the first 10 tracks from the series and is available on vinyl, CD and cassette.

=== 2022–present: Profound Mysteries and True Electric ===
At the end of 2021, the band launched a new Instagram account which led to speculation of new music. Through a series of teasers with the tagline "Press R" on social media and snippets of new material on the redesigned official website, the band confirmed a new project would be released in 2022, titled Profound Mysteries.

Röyksopp described the "conceptual project" as an "expanded creative universe" and a "continuous, holistic experience", suggesting the release of three albums in 2022 (listed on the website as red, yellow and green). Each release in the series was accompanied by a series of short-films from multiple directors and AI-generated "artefacts" and visualisers by an Australian artist Jonathan Zawada.

The two new songs were officially released in January 2022, "(Nothing But) Ashes..." and "The Ladder", followed by "Impossible" (featuring Alison Goldfrapp) in February. The Profound Mysteries album was released on 29 April 2022, with the band hosting a livestream of the album, followed by a tease of the next album and snippets of new music on the official website.

On 14 June 2022, the band released "Sorry", featuring Jamie Irrepressible as a lead single for Profound Mysteries II. At the same time the album became available for pre-order with "Unity", featuring Karen Harding available alongside it. A collection of remixes was also released. The second album was released on 19 August 2022, with the band once again hosting a YouTube event and teasing the next album, officially confirming the trilogy.

A number of individual songs were released in a run-up to the third and final album, starting with "Speed King" and "The Night" in August 2022. Profound Mysteries III was released on 18 November 2022 and features collaborations with Jamie Irrepressible, Alison Goldfrapp, Susanne Sundfør and Astrid S, among other artists. The series has been also released on vinyl for the first time, as 6LP boxset featuring all three albums and individual 2LP releases.

In 2023, the duo embarked on a headline tour and continued to release new remixes of the tracks from the Profound Mysteries series. The True Electric tour began in February 2023, with shows in European cities, including Stockholm, London and Berlin. The band described the tour as "energetic beats meet vast, transcending soundscapes" and explained their wish to bring "the pure and immersive Röyksopp experience" of studio productions to the stage. The shows were followed by appearances at various summer festivals in Europe including Bilbao BBK Live and Rock Werchter. The band continued their headline tour in autumn 2023 with 16 concerts in North America and Europe.

In December 2024, the duo surprise-released Nebulous Nights (An Ambient Excursion into Profound Mysteries), a 30-track ambient reinterpretation of their Profound Mysteries project, on streaming services. Each one of the thirty tracks is a reimagining of its counterpart on Profound Mysteries Parts I-III.

The band released True Electric in April 2025. The album is compilation of studio recordings of remixes performed during the tour of the same name, containing tracks from the band's discography and focusing on the "clubbier" aspects of their music. The band has also toured the world with DJ sets throughout the year.

== Style ==
=== Musical style ===
Röyksopp's music is often referred to as "warm", a reference to the band's downbeat electronica that combines elements of house and other genres. Röyksopp prefer to use analogue synthesizers over digital ones, with Svein Berge noting in an interview that "it's fairly limited, the fun you can have with the use of a mouse. We like to mix." In terms of specific instruments, the band generally favor vintage synthesizers and instruments from the 1970s and early 1980s, such as the Yamaha CS-80, the Mellotron Mk2, the Korg PS-3100, the monophonic Korg MS-20, the polyphonic Roland Juno-106, and the Synthe Korg 100 mono bass synth. When producing their earlier albums, the band also made heavy use of Akai samplers. To further create their unique sound, the band makes use of the Roland Space Echo, "an old Danish tube compressor that doesn’t really have a name," and a reverb unit taken from an old radio station.

A notable component of Röyksopp's repertoire is their use of multiple lead vocalists. For instance, Melody A.M. features the vocal talents of Anneli Drecker and Erlend Øye, The Understanding features Kate Havnevik, Chelonis R. Jones, and Karin Dreijer, and Junior features Robyn, Anneli Drecker, Karin Dreijer, and Lykke Li.

In addition to writing their own music, the duo enjoy remixing songs. Berge said, "It's obviously fun remixing people like Coldplay, artists of such a big calibre. Whenever people approach us for a remix it's very nice; being approached by Roots Manuva, The Streets, and even Peter Gabriel is quite fun." The band was also asked by Britney Spears for a remix, but had to turn down the offer due to scheduling conflicts.

=== Influences ===
As they grew up in Tromsø in northern Norway, Svein Berge and Torbjørn Brundtland listened to local artists like Bel Canto and former Bel Canto member Biosphere (whom, coincidentally, Berge and Brundtland would remix in 1997 while they were part of Alanïa). The band has also expressed their interest in the music of Kraftwerk, Brian Eno, Giorgio Moroder, Art of Noise, Vangelis, Erik Satie, and Francis Lai. Svein Berge has also stated that he is very fond of the production and programming skills of Datassette, who produced a remix of the Röyksopp single "Happy Up Here".

Röyksopp often include references and homages to their musical influences. For instance, "Röyksopp Forever" pays homage to famous electronica musicians from the 1970s, including, "the likes of Vangelis and these people, and Krautrock, like Tangerine Dream and even Pink Floyd and King Crimson."

=== Live performances ===
Röyksopp is known for its elaborate concert performances. Marc Hogan of Pitchfork Media said that "Those who have heard Röyksopp's two albums ... won't be surprised to learn the Norwegian duo's live set is much better and more raucuous than hunching next to the speakers at yer [sic] local Crate & Barrel". When performing live, the duo often appear in eccentric outfits. Ari Stein, of Electronic Beats, said, that during one particular live set, "Röyksopp returned with two separate encores, one which included Berge playing "Eple" with a space suit capsule on his head".

== Discography ==
=== Studio albums ===
- Melody A.M. (2001)
- The Understanding (2005)
- Junior (2009)
- Senior (2010)
- The Inevitable End (2014)
- Profound Mysteries (2022)
- Profound Mysteries II (2022)
- Profound Mysteries III (2022)
- Nebulous Nights (An Ambient Excursion into Profound Mysteries) (2024)
- True Electric (2025)

== Reception and awards ==
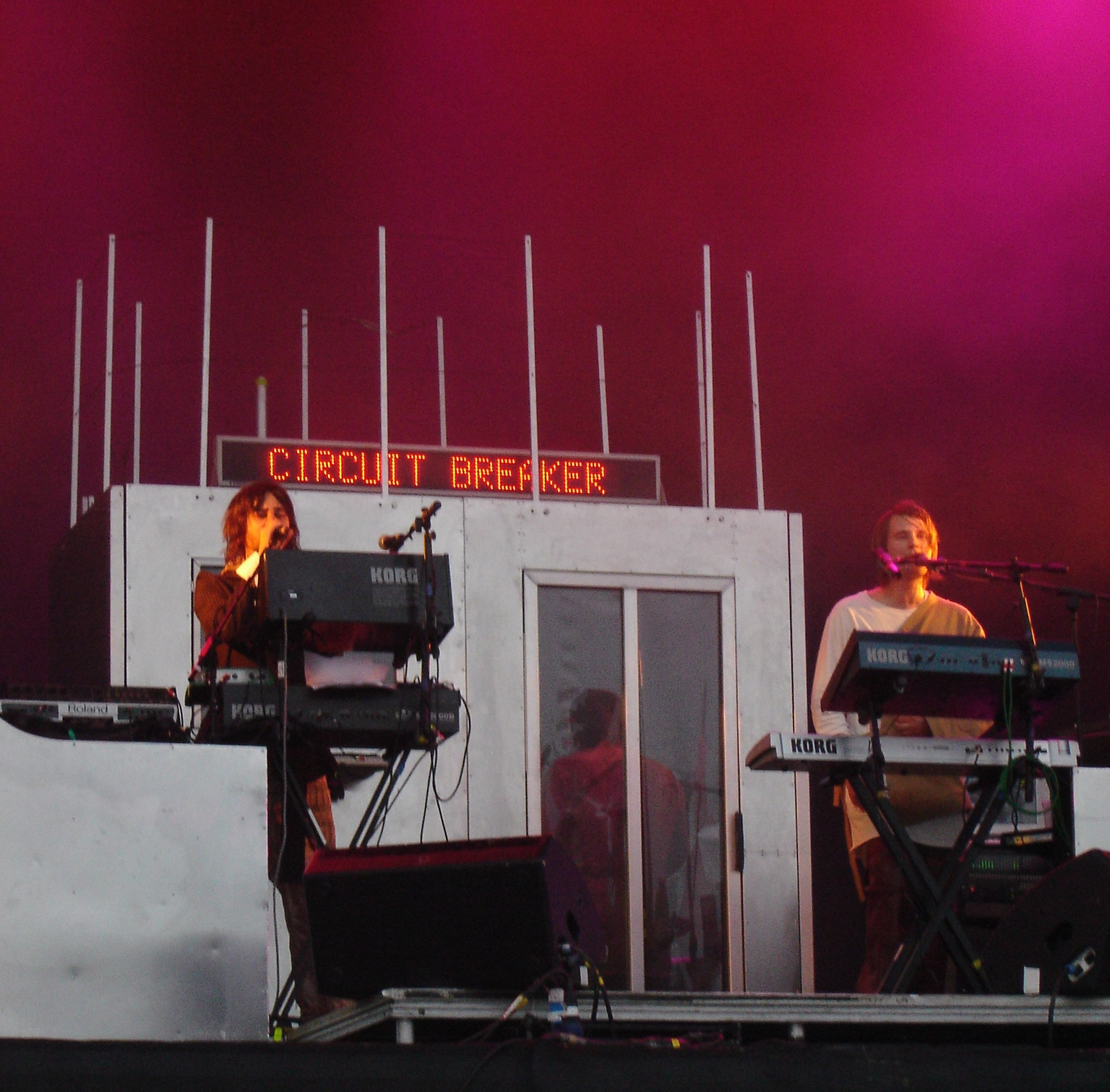
Röyksopp at the 2005 Glastonbury Festival

=== Critical reception ===
In addition to sales success, Röyksopp has garnered generally positive reception from many music critics. The band has also been nominated for many prestigious awards, including multiple Spellemannprisens and a Grammy.

The tracks "What Else Is There?" and "Eple" were chosen among the top 500 tracks of the decade by Pitchfork Media and placed in 375th and 336th place respectively. Another track written by Röyksopp, Annie's "Heartbeat", was placed 17th on the same list. On 24 November 2009, Melody A.M. was named the best Norwegian album of the decade by Norway's largest newspaper, Verdens Gang. The Understanding came 5th on the same list. In a ranking of the top 10 Norwegian tracks of the decade by VG, "Eple" and "What Else Is There?" were placed 3rd and 6th respectively.

However, some criticism has been aimed at the repetitive nature of the band and the trip hop genre in general. Robert Christgau said that, "chill-out tends toward waiting-room music for plastic surgeons who really want you to order that butt implant. Where once [Röyksopp] were extolled for their subtle melodicism, here their schlock candidly attacks the jugular. If they're Air, Goldie was Tricky." Pitchfork Media, in their review of Senior, said that "the kind of downtempo stuff that makes up the majority of Röyksopp's vocal-less compositions just doesn't hold up to concentrated, repeated listens like many other forms of instrumental electronic music."

=== Awards and nominations ===
Year	Award	Category	Nominee	Result	Ref.
2001	Spellemannprisen	Best Music Video	"Eple"	Won	
2001	Spellemannprisen	Best Electronic Album	Melody A.M.	Won	
2002	Spellemannprisen	Best Music Video	"Remind Me"	Won	
2002	Spellemannprisen	Spellemann of the Year	Röyksopp	Won	
2002	MTV Europe Music Awards	Best Music Video	"Remind Me"	Won	
2002	Alarmprisen	Best Pop	Melody A.M.	Won	
2002	Alarmprisen	Best House/Techno	Melody A.M.	Won	
2002	Alarmprisen	Best Music	"Eple"	Won	
2003	Brit Awards	Best International Group	Röyksopp	Nominated	
2005	Spellemannprisen	Best Pop Group	Röyksopp	Won	
2006	Alarmprisen	Best Club	The Understanding	Won	
2009	Grammy Awards	Best Remixed Recording, Non-Classical	"The Girl and the Robot" (Jean Elan Remix)	Nominated	
2010	Spellemannprisen	Best Composer	Röyksopp	Won	
2010	Spellemannprisen	Best Electronic Album	Junior	Won	
2013	P3 Gull	Song of the Year	"Running to the Sea"	Won	
2013	Spellemannprisen	Hit of the Year	"Running to the Sea"	Nominated	
2014	Spellemannprisen	Best Pop Group	Röyksopp	Nominated	
2014	Spellemannprisen	Best Composer	Do It Again & The Inevitable End	Nominated	
2015	Grammy Awards	Best Dance/Electronic Album	Do It Again	Nominated	
2015	Swedish Grammy Awards	Video of the Year	"Monument"	Won	
2015	Swedish Grammy Awards	Video of the Year	"Sayit"	Nominated	
2016	P3 Gull	P3 Prize	Röyksopp	Honoree	
2024	Rockheim Hall of Fame	—N/a	Röyksopp	Inducted	

Awards
Preceded by No Electronica award	Recipient of the Elektronika Spellemannprisen; 2001	Succeeded by Salvatore
Preceded by The National Bank	Recipient of the best Pop band Spellemannprisen; 2005	Succeeded by Minor Majority
Preceded by Lindstrøm	Recipient of the Elektronika Spellemannprisen; 2009	Succeeded by Lindstrøm
