= Kasso =

Kasso is a surname and given name. Notable people with this name include:

- Kasso Okoudjou, Beninese academic
- Lev Kasso (1865–1914), Russian politician
- Mihal Kasso, Greek politician
- Ricky Kasso, American murderer

== See also ==
- Kasso, Burkina Faso
- KASSO, skateboarding obstacle game show created by TBS Television
