= Do It Again (EP) =

EP by Röyksopp and Robyn
- Released: 23 May 2014
- Recorded: 2013–2014
- Studio: Röyksopp's studio (Bergen, Norway), Durango Recording (Stockholm, Sweden)
- Genre: Electronic
- Length: 35:24
- Label: Dog Triumph
- Producer: Röyksopp; Robyn

Röyksopp chronology
Late Night Tales: Röyksopp (2013)	Do It Again (2014)	The Inevitable End (2014)

Robyn chronology
Body Talk Pt. 3 (2010)	Do It Again (2014)	Love Is Free (2015)

Singles from Do It Again
- 1. "Do It Again" Released: 28 April 2014; 2. "Sayit" Released: 19 May 2014; 3. "Monument" Released: 15 August 2014

Do It Again is an extended play (EP) by Norwegian electronic music duo Röyksopp and Swedish singer Robyn, released on 23 May 2014 by Dog Triumph. The EP coincides with Röyksopp and Robyn's joint tour, the Röyksopp & Robyn Do It Again Tour 2014, featuring shows in Europe and North America. Following her Body Talk Tour, Robyn travelled to Bergen, Norway, where she began working on new music with Röyksopp in early 2013, having previously collaborated with the duo on the songs "The Girl and the Robot" (2009) and "None of Dem" (2010).

The EP was met with generally positive reviews from music critics, who praised its music as "flawlessly-produced" and "adventurous". Do It Again reached number three in Norway and number 20 in the United Kingdom, while becoming the first number-one album on Billboard's Dance/Electronic Albums chart for both artists. It was preceded by the singles "Do It Again" and "Sayit", the former of which attained moderate success on the charts. The EP was nominated for the 2015 Grammy Award for Best Dance/Electronic Album.

== Background and development ==
"We didn't have any master plan for what we were doing. Sounding a bit pretentious, this was a free space without any master plan or blueprint for all three of us. We didn't have any plan other than to hang out, be together and make some music. And we kept it very much between the three of us, without including too many people in terms of labels and management and so on. Which gives you a certain freedom and flexibility. So that was the only sort of thing that we had; have fun, let's have no inhibitions, no limitations and do whatever we want to do, and that's why we made a 10-minute track with saxophone."

— Berge on Do It Again

Röyksopp and Robyn first collaborated in 2009 on the song "The Girl and the Robot", which was released as a single from Röyksopp's third studio album, Junior. The two artists collaborated again in 2010 on "None of Dem", a track from Robyn's fifth studio album, Body Talk Pt. 1. On 9 December 2013, Röyksopp and Robyn announced plans to embark on a joint tour titled the Röyksopp & Robyn Do It Again Tour 2014, which would include dates across Europe and North America.

After concluding her Body Talk Tour in 2011, Robyn felt uninspired to record a new album. She decided to travel to Bergen, Norway, where she started working on new music with Röyksopp in the beginning of 2013 "with no real agenda". "I've been going back and forth to Bergen to record and write with the boys up until recently. Collaborating with [Svein Berge and Torbjørn Brundtland] is something I enjoy very much. In the beginning we just knew we wanted to do something together and then it started to feel more like a band thing than songs for a Röyksopp or Robyn album so we're releasing this music together as a band, you could say", she said, describing the collaborative project as "an outlet for not having to live up to anything but my own expectations."

Robyn also stated that she wanted to work with the duo "from scratch". "I thought it would be interesting. In the beginning we just decided to make music. No one said, 'We should make music for this album' or 'We should make music for that album.' Then I had this idea where, you know, maybe we can create something together. I had no real wish to start recording an album right away. I'd just gotten off tour. I wanted to just play around and do stuff and collaborate. Secretly in my mind I wanted us to be a band, but I didn't think it seriously. Then we turned into a band. Carrying the weight together is something that I think changes the music."

According to Berge, the three of them were "in a particular place and space in our lives, where things were perhaps a bit bleak. So, in a way, we were all starting from square one, with no real intention other than to take our time and make what we wanted. And value every opinion, and I think that that translated well into the music." The duo commented that Do It Again "doesn't sound like Röyksopp featuring Robyn or Robyn produced by Röyksopp, it's just something else entirely. The word 'collaboration' has never before been more justified in the world of music!" In April 2014, it was reported that Do It Again would serve as an introduction to Röyksopp's then-untitled fifth studio album, The Inevitable End, which was released in November and features two songs from the EP.

== Composition ==
The EP opens with "Monument", a 10-minute track inspired by the clay sculptures of Brazilian-American artist Juliana Cerqueira Leite that Robyn saw at London's Saatchi Gallery. The song's minimal instrumentation consists of a "stretched-out" saxophone outro and synthesised bass, while lyrically, Robyn stated it is "about death", "defining who you are" and "a physical sensation of an emotion". "Sayit", an electro-punk and house song, features a "lustful" conversation between Robyn and a Speak & Spell toy over a "glitchy" techno beat. Berge described the song as "a bit of an homage to the good old days of clubbing", and cited it as "the dirtiest song on the record, both in terms of production and concept."

"Do It Again" is a "throbbing" electropop song on which Robyn "contemplates resuming an on-again, off-again relationship", while incorporating "fluttering" synths and "slamming" drums. Röyksopp and Robyn wrote the title track after an "epic" night out in Bergen, Norway, resulting in what the trio calls an "accidental pop song". "Every Little Thing" is a bittersweet electro ballad that "layers synthesizers and a gently pulsating beat to evoke heartbeats and conflicted emotions." The ten-minute closing instrumental, "Inside the Idle Hour Club", is an "almost eerie ambient soundscape". The track "barely features Robyn's vocals at all", while employing "looping synths and brass just barely pinned down by a hypnotic house beat."

== Release and promotion ==
On 14 April 2014, Röyksopp and Robyn announced that their collaborative EP, Do It Again, would be released on 26 May, while sharing a snippet of the song "Monument". The title track was released digitally on 28 April 2014 as the lead single from the EP. The song reached number 16 on the Swedish Singles Chart and number 18 on the Danish Singles Chart, as well as number one on the Hot Dance Club Songs chart in the United States.

The second single, "Sayit", was released digitally on 19 May 2014, while its accompanying video premiered through H&M Life on the same day. The song "Monument" is featured in Volvo's "Made by Sweden" ad campaign, which stars Robyn and launched online and on television in Sweden on 2 May 2014. The song was released as the EP's third and final single on 15 August 2014, and was preceded by a Max Vitali-directed music video on 12 August.

=== Tour ===
To promote the collaborative effort, Röyksopp and Robyn announced on 9 December 2013 that they would be co-headlining a tour together, the Röyksopp & Robyn Do It Again Tour 2014. The first tour dates were unveiled on 7 April 2014, along with a promotional trailer featuring the track "Sayit". The tour kicked off at Sónar by Night in Barcelona, Spain, on 13 June 2014. "We're going to do a set each—Röyksopp will play their songs, and I'll play my songs—then we'll do a part of the set together, with all the songs that we've ever done together", Robyn told Billboard.

Tour dates
Date	City	Country	Venue	Festival	Attendance	Revenue
13 June 2014	Barcelona	Spain	Fira Gran Via	Sónar by Night	—N/a	—N/a
14 June 2014	Aarhus	Denmark	Ådalen	NorthSide Festival	—N/a	—N/a
26 June 2014	Redmond	United States	Marymoor Park	—N/a	—N/a	—N/a
28 June 2014	San Francisco	United States	Bill Graham Civic Auditorium	—N/a	8,712 / 8,712	$392,040
29 June 2014	Los Angeles	United States	Hollywood Bowl	—N/a	—N/a	—N/a
18 July 2014	Gräfenhainichen	Germany	Ferropolis	Melt! Festival	—N/a	—N/a
19 July 2014	Southwold	England	Henham Park	Latitude Festival	—N/a	—N/a
8 August 2014	Oslo	Norway	Middelalderparken	Øyafestivalen	—N/a	—N/a
9 August 2014	Gothenburg	Sweden	Slottsskogen	Way Out West	—N/a	—N/a
10 August 2014	Helsinki	Finland	Suvilahti	Flow Festival	—N/a	—N/a
15 August 2014	Kiewit	Belgium	Kempische Steenweg	Pukkelpop	—N/a	—N/a
20 August 2014	New York City	United States	JBL Live at Pier 97	—N/a	—N/a	—N/a
21 August 2014	Vienna	United States	Wolf Trap	—N/a	—N/a	—N/a
22 August 2014	Boston	United States	Leader Bank Pavilion	—N/a	—N/a	—N/a
24 August 2014	Chicago	United States	Jay Pritzker Pavilion	—N/a	—N/a	—N/a
25 August 2014	Toronto	Canada	TD Echo Beach	—N/a	—N/a	—N/a
30 August 2014	Zürich	Switzerland	Festivalgelände bei Glattbrugg	Zürich Openair	—N/a	—N/a
28 December 2014 – 1 January 2015	Lorne	Australia		Falls Festival	—N/a	—N/a
29 December 2014 – 1 January 2015	Marion Bay	Australia		Falls Festival	—N/a	—N/a
30 December 2014 – 3 January 2015	Byron Bay	Australia	North Byron Parklands	Falls Festival	—N/a	—N/a
3–4 January 2015	Busselton	Australia	Sir Stewart Bovell Park	Southbound		
Total					8,712 / 8,712	$392,040

Cancelled shows
Date	City	Country	Venue	Reason
27 August 2014	Morrison	United States	Red Rocks Amphitheatre	Logistical reasons and production developments

== Critical reception ==
Professional ratings
Aggregate scores
Source	Rating
AnyDecentMusic?	7.4/10
Metacritic	76/100
Review scores
Source	Rating
AllMusic	4/5 stars
Consequence of Sound	B+
DIY	5/5 stars
Drowned in Sound	7/10
Exclaim!	9/10
musicOMH	3.5/5 stars
The Observer	4/5 stars
Pitchfork	7.7/10
Rolling Stone	3/5 stars
Slant Magazine	2.5/5 stars

Do It Again received generally positive reviews from music critics. At Metacritic, which assigns a normalised rating out of 100 to reviews from mainstream publications, the EP received an average score of 76, based on 22 reviews. Tom Morris of DIY characterised the EP as "a riot of compulsive, flawlessly-produced, and beautifully impassioned music", and lauded it as "a towering edifice of electronic brilliance". Stephen Carlick of Exclaim! commented that on Do It Again, "Röyksopp and Robyn have not only traversed new territory, they've made it their own." AllMusic's Heather Phares wrote that Röyksopp "bookends the EP with two of the most introspective tracks to ever grace a Robyn-affiliated project", and noted that "the EP's sugary pop center provides a welcome balance", citing "Sayit" and the title track as highlights. Despite stating that "Röyksopp's contributions flag and sometimes feel dated or too techno-y", Caitlin White of Consequence of Sound viewed Do It Again as "a solid collection of five disparate songs" and found that it "feels like an exploration for all involved, and even manages to address gender politics in discreet but intriguing ways." Pitchfork's Marc Hogan called the EP "excellent" and described it as "the physical artifact of Robyn and Röyksopp's union, it's extravagant and left of center, but it's above all generous."

Killian Fox of The Observer opined, "What's unexpected about this mini-album is how subdued Robyn, a larger-than-life presence, sounds on (most of) it", concluding that "Röyksopp are on top form here, and when Robyn returns to her exuberant self on the title track, expressing mixed feelings about having insatiable appetites, the effect is electrifying." Joe Goggins of Drowned in Sound stated that "Do It Again is eccentric and ends too quickly, but those considerations pale next to the fact that within less than half an hour, Robyn and Röyksopp go from eyeing each other with genuine suspicion to sounding as if they've never been apart." Max Raymond of musicOMH wrote that with Do It Again, Röyksopp and Robyn have "confirmed how much of a dynamite pairing they can be", while remarking that the EP "isn't as downright amazing as it could have been, but there are far more pros than cons. It's definitely self-indulgent in places, resulting in some of the most adventurous pieces of music that either artist has conjured up in their respective careers, but those moments are entirely justified." Rolling Stone's Sophie Weiner expressed that "[e]ven without the ecstatic melodrama of Robyn's best work or the momentum of Röyksopp albums like 2009's Junior, this is a worthwhile peek into three great electro-pop minds", naming "Monument" the EP's best track. In a mixed review, Slant Magazine's Kevin Liedel felt that "Röyksopp and Robyn share so much sonic DNA that their team-up is almost self-defeating, blurring the distinction between the two to the point where their respective quirks are essentially scratched in favor of a cohesive but far too clinical production", adding that "neither party challenges the other to escape this new comfort zone".

Do It Again was nominated for Best Dance/Electronic Album at the 2015 Grammy Awards, but lost out to Aphex Twin's Syro.

== Commercial performance ==
In Röyksopp's native Norway, Do It Again debuted at number three on the Norwegian Albums Chart, becoming the duo's first record to miss the top spot. It entered the UK Albums Chart at number 20, selling 4,806 copies in its first week. In the United States, the EP debuted at number 14 on the Billboard 200 and at number one on the Dance/Electronic Albums chart with 15,000 copies, giving both artists their first number-one release on the latter chart. Do It Again also became the highest-charting album on the Billboard 200 by a Norwegian artist (Röyksopp), a record previously held by A-ha's Hunting High and Low, which peaked at number 15 in 1985. Elsewhere, the EP reached the top five in Denmark, the top 15 in Australia and Canada, and the top 20 in Switzerland.

== Track listing ==
All tracks are written by Röyksopp and Robyn, except where noted.

No.	Title	Producer(s)	Length
1.	"Monument"	Röyksopp; Robyn	9:57
2.	"Sayit"	Röyksopp	6:26
3.	"Do It Again"	Röyksopp; Robyn	5:06
4.	"Every Little Thing"	Röyksopp	4:03
5.	"Inside the Idle Hour Club" (writers: Röyksopp)	Röyksopp	9:54
Total length:			35:26

== Personnel ==
Credits adapted from the liner notes of Do It Again.

- Röyksopp – production, all instruments, instrument recording (all tracks)
- Robyn – production (tracks 1, 3); vocals (tracks 1, 3–5); human vocals (track 2)
- Kjetil Møster – saxophone (track 1)
- Jamie Irrepressible – backing vocals (track 1)
- Simon Sigfridsson – vocal recording (track 4)
- Mike Marsh – mastering
- Kacper Kasprzyk – photography
- Sandberg&Timonen – art direction
- Suzanne Liv – retouch

== Charts ==
=== Weekly charts ===
Chart (2014)	Peak position
Australian Albums (ARIA)	14
Austrian Albums (Ö3 Austria)	49
Canadian Albums (Billboard)	15
Danish Albums (Hitlisten)	5
German Albums (Offizielle Top 100)	70
Irish Albums (IRMA)	23
Irish Independent Albums (IRMA)	5
Italian Albums (FIMI)	50
New Zealand Albums (RMNZ)	31
Norwegian Albums (VG-lista)	3
Scottish Albums (OCC)	22
Spanish Albums (Promusicae)	40
Swiss Albums (Schweizer Hitparade)	18
UK Albums (OCC)	20
UK Independent Albums (OCC)	3
US Billboard 200	14
US Top Dance Albums (Billboard)	1

=== Year-end charts ===
Chart (2014)	Position
US Top Dance/Electronic Albums (Billboard)	24

== Release history ==
Region	Date	Format	Label	Ref.
Australia	23 May 2014	Digital download	Pod	
Germany	23 May 2014	CD; digital download	Embassy One	
Norway	23 May 2014	CD; LP; digital download	Dog Triumph	
United Kingdom	25 May 2014	Digital download	Dog Triumph; Wall of Sound; Cooking Vinyl	
United Kingdom	26 May 2014	CD	Dog Triumph; Wall of Sound; Cooking Vinyl	
France	26 May 2014	Digital download	Dog Triumph	
Japan	26 May 2014	Digital download	Dog Triumph	
United States	26 May 2014	Digital download	Cherrytree; Interscope	
Sweden	28 May 2014	CD; LP; digital download	Dog Triumph	
Australia	30 May 2014	CD; LP	Pod	
United Kingdom	2 June 2014	LP	Dog Triumph; Wall of Sound; Cooking Vinyl	
Germany	13 June 2014	LP	Embassy One	
Hong Kong	16 June 2014	CD	Love Da	
United States	24 June 2014	CD	Cherrytree; Interscope	
United States	13 July 2014	LP (Urban Outfitters exclusive)	Cherrytree; Interscope	
