= The Inevitable End =

Studio album by Röyksopp
- Released: 7 November 2014
- Genres: Electropop; electronic rock
- Length: 60:49
- Label: Dog Triumph
- Producer: Röyksopp

Röyksopp chronology
Do It Again (2014)	The Inevitable End (2014)	Profound Mysteries (2022)

Singles from The Inevitable End
- 1. "Monument (T.I.E. Version)" Released: 9 September 2014; 2. "Skulls" Released: 29 September 2014; 3. "Sordid Affair" Released: 13 October 2014; 4. "I Had This Thing" Released: 30 January 2015

The Inevitable End is the fifth studio album by Norwegian electronic music duo Röyksopp, released on 7 November 2014 by Dog Triumph. Svein Berge stated the album has a "dark energy", while Robyn described the album as "sad, but it's not cold. It's very warm." Four singles were released from the album: "Monument" (T.I.E. Version), "Skulls", "Sordid Affair" and "I Had This Thing".

In September 2014, the duo announced that The Inevitable End would be their final studio album in the traditional sense, adding that they are "not going to stop making music, but the album format as such, this is the last thing from us". In 2022, the duo announced a new "musical project" entitled Profound Mysteries, consisting of three albums released on 29 April, 19 August, and 18 November 2022.

== Critical reception ==
Professional ratings
Aggregate scores
Source	Rating
AnyDecentMusic?	7.2/10
Metacritic	75/100
Review scores
Source	Rating
AllMusic	4/5 stars
Billboard	3.5/5 stars
Entertainment Weekly	A−
Exclaim!	9/10
The Guardian	3/5 stars
NME	5/10
Nordlys	5/6
The Observer	3/5 stars
Pitchfork	5.9/10
PopMatters	8/10
Slant Magazine	3.5/5 stars

The Inevitable End received generally positive reviews from music critics. At Metacritic, which assigns a normalised rating out of 100 to reviews from mainstream publications, the album received an average score of 75, based on 20 reviews. Madison Vain of Entertainment Weekly noted that the album "showcase[s] the best of the duo's trance-y instrumentals, propulsive hooks, and bubbling beats." Scott Simpson of Exclaim! opined that Röyksopp "have recorded the best final album they could have envisioned: a layered and cohesive package of enveloping synths filled with addictive hooks." Timothy Monger of AllMusic viewed the album as "a strong finale in the duo's signature style and whether or not this truly is the end or merely the end of their album era, The Inevitable End sits among the best in Röyksopp's catalog." Billboard's Jamieson Cox stated that the duo were "leaving on a high note" and lauded the album as "sublime melancholy electro-pop, rich and emotionally resonant without feeling maudlin." Ryan Lathan of PopMatters called the album "gorgeously produced" and wrote that it "will never be looked upon as a terribly uplifting experience, but its lyrical content treats heartache, despair, self-hatred, remorse, depression, and the fear of the unknown with utter respect."

Franklin Jones of Slant Magazine commented, "Though the album doesn't skimp on potentially insufferable moments of bottom-lip-biting farewell [...] the best tracks boast a fiercely renewed energy that suggests Berge and Brundtland still have much more to offer." Corinne Jones of The Observer remarked that "[t]he best songs have a dark, brooding quality: the Norwegian duo's once naive sound has evolved to a smarter, more lyrically resonant electronica, and if it weren't for a couple of whimsical ballads, this would be a powerful, cohesive goodbye." At The Guardian, Michael Hann found that The Inevitable End "embodies [Röyksopp's] strengths and [...] weaknesses"; he cited "Running to the Sea" and "Sordid Affair" as standouts from the album, but felt that the album contains "too much drift". Pitchfork's Marc Hogan expressed, "Despite capable guest vocalists, including Robyn herself, [the album is] generally devoted to glossy, bittersweet electronic drifts that are too slow, too long, or too bland to hold interest for 60 minutes, though often unobjectionable in smaller servings." Phil Hebblethwaite of NME characterised the album as "the sound of a band once introspective but alive, now lost, depressed and completely unavailable."

== Commercial performance ==
The Inevitable End debuted at number 38 on the UK Albums Chart, selling 3,487 copies in its first week. In the United States, the album entered the Billboard 200 at number 103 and the Dance/Electronic Albums chart at number two, with first-week sales of 4,000 copies.

== Track listing ==
All tracks are written by Röyksopp, except where noted.

Disc one
No.	Title	Vocals	Length
1.	"Skulls"	Röyksopp	3:46
2.	"Monument" (T.I.E. Version) (writers: Röyksopp, Robyn)	Röyksopp; Robyn	4:47
3.	"Sordid Affair"	Man Without Country (Ryan James)	6:20
4.	"You Know I Have to Go"	Jamie Irrepressible	7:35
5.	"Save Me"	Susanne Sundfør	4:36
6.	"I Had This Thing" (writers: Röyksopp, Jamie Irrepressible)	Jamie Irrepressible	5:48
7.	"Rong" (writers: Röyksopp, Robyn)	Robyn	2:32
8.	"Here She Comes Again"	Jamie Irrepressible	5:02
9.	"Running to the Sea"	Susanne Sundfør	4:56
10.	"Compulsion" (writers: Röyksopp, Jamie Irrepressible)	Jamie Irrepressible	6:59
11.	"Coup de Grace"		3:19
12.	"Thank You"	Röyksopp	6:36

Disc two: Prologue (original issue)
No.	Title	Vocals	Length
1.	"Do It Again" (RYXP Version) (writers: Röyksopp, Robyn)	Robyn	7:03
2.	"Goodnite, Mr. Sweetheart"		5:02
3.	"Caramel Afternoon"		2:20
4.	"Oh No!"		1:42
5.	"Something in My Heart" (writers: Röyksopp, Jamie Irrepressible)	Jamie Irrepressible	5:29

Japanese edition bonus track
No.	Title	Length
6.	"I Just Don't Understand You"	4:39

Disc two: Prologue (2017 reissue)
No.	Title	Vocals	Length
1.	"Do It Again" (RYXP Version) (writers: Röyksopp, Robyn)	Robyn	7:03
2.	"Something in My Heart" (writers: Röyksopp, Jamie Irrepressible)	Jamie Irrepressible	5:29
3.	"Oh No!"		1:42
4.	"Goodnite, Mr. Sweetheart"		5:02
5.	"Caramel Afternoon"		2:20
6.	"In the End"	Man Without Country (Ryan James), Susanne Sundfør	6:16

== Personnel ==
Credits adapted from the liner notes of The Inevitable End.

- Röyksopp – production, instruments, mastering (all tracks); vocals (on "Skulls", "Monument" (T.I.E Version), "Thank You" and "I Just Don't Understand You"); artwork
- Robyn – vocals (on "Monument" (T.I.E Version), "Rong" and "Do It Again" (RYXP Version))
- Man Without Country (Ryan James) – vocals (on "Sordid Affair" and "In The End")
- Susanne Sundfør – vocals (on "Save Me", "Running to the Sea" and "In the End"); additional vocal effects (on "Here She Comes Again")
- Jamie Irrepressible – vocals (on "You Know I Have to Go", "I Had This Thing", "Here She Comes Again", "Compulsion" and "Something in My Heart")
- Kato Ådland – guitar (on "I Had This Thing")
- Davide Rossi – strings, string arrangements (on "Rong" and "Oh No!")
- Walter Coelho – mastering (all tracks except "Skulls", "Running to the Sea" and "Thank You")
- Mike Marsh – mastering (on "Skulls", "Running to the Sea" and "Thank You")
- Arnau Pi – artwork
- Stian Andersen – photo of Juliane S

== Charts ==
Chart (2014–15)	Peak position
Australian Albums (ARIA)	23
Belgian Albums (Ultratop Flanders)	26
Belgian Albums (Ultratop Wallonia)	45
Danish Albums (Hitlisten)	34
Dutch Albums (Album Top 100)	53
French Albums (SNEP)	137
German Albums (Offizielle Top 100)	54
Greek Albums (IFPI)	72
Irish Albums (IRMA)	75
Irish Independent Albums (IRMA)	13
Japanese Albums (Oricon)	241
Norwegian Albums (VG-lista)	2
Scottish Albums (Official Charts)	39
Spanish Albums (Promusicae)	87
Swedish Albums (Sverigetopplistan)	50
UK Albums (Official Charts)	38
UK Dance Albums (Official Charts)	5
UK Independent Albums (Official Charts)	2
US Billboard 200	103
US Top Dance Albums (Billboard)	2

== Release history ==
Region	Date	Format	Label	Ref.
Australia	7 November 2014	CD; LP; digital download	Pod	
Ireland	7 November 2014	CD; LP; digital download	Dog Triumph; Wall of Sound	
Japan	8 November 2014	CD; digital download	Beat; Dog Triumph	
United Kingdom	9 November 2014	Digital download	Dog Triumph; Wall of Sound	
France	10 November 2014	CD; digital download	Polydor	
Norway	10 November 2014	CD; LP; digital download	Dog Triumph	
United Kingdom	10 November 2014	CD; LP	Dog Triumph; Wall of Sound	
United States	10 November 2014	CD; digital download	Cherrytree; Interscope	
Germany	21 November 2014	CD; LP; digital download	Embassy of Music	
France	8 December 2014	LP	Polydor	
United States	15 December 2014	LP	Cherrytree; Interscope	
