= Senior (album) =

Studio album by Röyksopp
- Released: 8 September 2010
- Genre: Downtempo; ambient; trip hop
- Length: 54:14
- Label: Wall of Sound
- Producer: Röyksopp

Röyksopp chronology
Junior (2009)	Senior (2010)	Late Night Tales: Röyksopp (2013)

Singles from Senior
- 1. "The Drug" Released: 8 August 2010; 2. "Forsaken Cowboy" Released: 25 February 2011

Professional ratings
Aggregate scores
Source	Rating
AnyDecentMusic?	6.6/10
Metacritic	61/100
Review scores
Source	Rating
AllMusic	3.5/5 stars
Filter	70%
musicOMH	3/5 stars
Now	3/5
Pitchfork	6.0/10
PopMatters	4/10
Under the Radar	6/10 stars

Senior is the fourth studio album by Norwegian electronic music duo Röyksopp. It was released on 8 September 2010 by Wall of Sound. Consisting of instrumental tracks only, the album is described as more introspective and withdrawn than its predecessor, Junior (2009). The final track on the CD version, "A Long, Long Way", also includes the hidden track "The Final Day", which is available as a separate track on the iTunes Store.

The album debuted at number 33 on the UK Albums Chart with first-week sales of 3,864 copies. Senior spawned two singles: "The Drug" and "Forsaken Cowboy". In December 2012, the album was awarded a silver certification from the Independent Music Companies Association (IMPALA), indicating sales in excess of 20,000 copies throughout Europe.

== Background ==
Senior is intended to be an introspective, withdrawn, atmospheric counterpart to the "bubbly dance grooves" of Junior (2009), with Röyksopp stating it has a more "autumn mood" to it, in contrast to Junior's "spring feel". In an interview with KCRW's Morning Becomes Eclectic, Svein Berge dubbed Senior "the senile sibling of Junior who lives in the attic". Berge cited "The Alcoholic" as a standout track, explaining that they had "this romantic, nostalgic idea based on this hobo who hitchhikes on trains and travels from place to place".

== Promotion ==
To promote Senior, Röyksopp released a 10-minute film titled Röyksopp's Adventures in Barbieland on 6 August 2010, containing six tracks from the album. Directed by Andreas Nilsson, the film shows Röyksopp living as two elderly musicians in a house full of Barbie dolls.

"The Drug" was released as the album's lead single on 8 August 2010. The music video for the song, directed by Norwegian film duo That Go (Noel Paul and Stefan Moore), premiered on 3 September 2010. The video features three girls (Amanda Bauer, Jessie Vanatta and Jenna Lammert) in airbrushed T-shirts walking through an apocalyptic landscape in Detroit, Michigan. An extended, 10-minute cut of the video, redubbed "Senior Living", that uses six tracks from the album was released on 18 November 2010. The album's second single, "Forsaken Cowboy", was released on 25 February 2011.

On 4 November 2010, Röyksopp partnered with Genero.tv to launch a competition allowing fans to create videos for each one of the tracks from Senior. The winners were announced on 27 January 2011, with a video for "The Alcoholic" being chosen as the overall winner.

== Track listing ==
All tracks are written by Svein Berge and Torbjørn Brundtland.

No.	Title	Length
1.	"....And the Forest Began to Sing"	1:50
2.	"Tricky Two"	7:51
3.	"The Alcoholic"	5:10
4.	"Senior Living"	5:09
5.	"The Drug"	5:58
6.	"Forsaken Cowboy"	5:28
7.	"The Fear"	7:01
8.	"Coming Home"	5:05
9.	"A Long, Long Way"	4:00
10.	"The Final Day" (hidden track)	6:42

== Personnel ==
Credits adapted from the liner notes of Senior.

- Röyksopp – performance, recording, production, instruments (all tracks); bass (track 7)
- Ole Vegard Skauge – bass (track 1)
- Kato Ådland – guitar (track 3); bass (track 7)
- Davide Rossi – string arrangements, strings (track 4)
- Lindy-Fay Hella – vocals (track 6)
- Bjørn Sæther – drums (track 7)
- Mike Marsh – mastering

== Charts ==
Chart (2010)	Peak position
Australian Albums (ARIA)	80
Australian Dance Albums (ARIA)	12
Belgian Albums (Ultratop Flanders)	21
Belgian Albums (Ultratop Wallonia)	31
Danish Albums (Hitlisten)	30
Dutch Albums (Album Top 100)	41
European Albums (Billboard)	28
French Albums (SNEP)	128
German Albums (Offizielle Top 100)	52
Greek International Albums (IFPI)	33
Irish Albums (IRMA)	58
Irish Independent Albums (IRMA)	8
Japanese Albums (Oricon)	226
Norwegian Albums (VG-lista)	1
Scottish Albums (OCC)	49
Swedish Albums (Sverigetopplistan)	17
Swiss Albums (Schweizer Hitparade)	28
UK Albums (OCC)	33
UK Dance Albums (OCC)	4
UK Independent Albums (OCC)	3
US Heatseekers Albums (Billboard)	46
US Top Dance Albums (Billboard)	18

== Release history ==
Region	Date	Label	Ref.
Japan	8 September 2010	EMI	
Australia	10 September 2010	EMI	
Germany	10 September 2010	PIAS	
France	13 September 2010	PIAS	
Norway	13 September 2010	Virgin	
United Kingdom	13 September 2010	Wall of Sound	
United States	22 November 2010	MB3	
