= Jonathan Zawada =

Australian multidisciplinary artist (born 1981)

- Born: 1981 (age 44–45); Perth, Western Australia, Australia
- Occupations: Multidisciplinary artist; designer; music-video director
- Years active: c. 2000–present
- Notable work: Apocalypso cover art; Skin cover art; Metamathemagical Opera House projection; Tall Tales artwork and videos
- Awards: ARIA Award for Best Cover Art (2008, 2016)
- Website: zawada.art zawada.au

Jonathan Zawada (born 1981) is an Australian multidisciplinary artist, designer and music-video director whose work spans painting, digital image-making, installation and product design. He gained prominence creating record-sleeve artwork, winning ARIA Awards for The Presets' Apocalypso and Flume's Skin, and has held exhibits internationally. Zawada designed the 2018 Metamathemagical projection for the Sydney Opera House sails and created the artwork, music videos, and an accompanying film for Mark Pritchard and Thom Yorke's album Tall Tales (2025).

== Early life and career ==
Zawada was born in Perth, Western Australia, and is largely self-taught. He began professional graphic-design work in Sydney in the early 2000s. His first solo shows – Semantic Webs (2005) and Boolean Values (2008) at Monster Children Gallery – reportedly sold out and later toured to Melbourne. In late 2010 he relocated to Los Angeles and staged Over Time at Prism Gallery – a series of digital landscapes from manipulated graph data painted on linen.

== Collaborations ==
Zawada created the floral cover and full visual campaign for Flume's Skin, winning the 2016 ARIA Award for Best Cover Art. The partnership continued with pop-up exhibitions in Los Angeles and Sydney and, in 2024, the immersive installation Every dull moment (EDM) at the Art Gallery of New South Wales.

Zawada has collaborated with Mark Pritchard on MP Productions EP 1 (2020), and later with Pritchard and Thom Yorke on Tall Tales (2025). For Tall Tales, Zawada designed the artwork and videos, a feature film version of which was screened on 8 May 2025 – the day before the album's release.

Zawada created animated visualisers for Röyksopp's Profound Mysteries trilogy.

== Critical reception ==
Writers note Zawada's blending of analog and digital, artificial and natural. Stephen Todd, wrote in the Australian Financial Review that he sees the world as a "metamathemagical place where science and sensuality, the rational and the emotional, collide."

For Pritchard and Yorke's multimedia project Tall Tales, Jazz Monroe at Pitchfork called Zawada the duo's "informal third member". Fermín Cimadevilla at motion design website Motionographer wrote that the accompanying feature‑length film "evokes a distinct atmosphere – dreamlike yet disorienting" and stated that it defies cliche and AI art trends.

Design press have likewise commended his album packaging. Megan Williams, writing in Creative Review, described the AI‑assisted sleeve for Pritchard's MP Productions EP 1 as "distorted and deformed to surreal effect" and "a bizarre collage of incongruous shapes and textures", adding that it "casts a wry glance at the very technologies that created it."

== Awards ==
- ARIA Award for Best Cover Art, for Apocalypso by The Presets (2008)
- ARIA Award for Best Cover Art, for Skin by Flume (2016)
- Nominee, J Awards, Australian Video of the Year, for "Hi This Is Flume" (2019)

== Exhibitions ==
Year	Title	Venue	City	Notes / refs
2005	Semantic Webs	Monster Children Gallery	Sydney, Australia	First solo show.
2008	Boolean Values	Monster Children Gallery	Sydney / Melbourne, Australia	Catalogue also self-published.
2010–11	Over Time	Prism Gallery	Los Angeles, United States	Data-driven landscapes.
2014	Touchingly Unfeeling	Calm & Punk Gallery	Tokyo, Japan	Solo exhibition.
2022	On Burning Mirrors	Calm & Punk Gallery	Tokyo, Japan	Machine-learning image generation.
2016	Flume × Jonathan Zawada Pop-Up	Space 15Twenty	Los Angeles, United States	Exhibition of Skin visuals.
2018	Metamathemagical – Lighting of the Sails	Sydney Opera House	Sydney, Australia	15-minute projection mapped to Opera House sails.
2023–24	DXP² – Digital Transformation Planet	21st Century Museum of Contemporary Art	Kanazawa, Japan	Included "Sacrifice, An Act of Permanence".
2024	Every dull moment (EDM)	Art Gallery of New South Wales (Tank)	Sydney, Australia	Immersive installation with Flume.

== Publications ==
- Can the Drummer Give Some Back (Sixpack France fanzine, 2010)
- GASBOOK 31 – Jonathan Zawada (Gas As Interface, 2019)
