= Profound Mysteries =

2022 studio album by Röyksopp

Studio album by Röyksopp
- Released: 29 April 2022
- Genres: Electropop; electronica; trip hop; ambient; dance
- Length: 50:59
- Label: Dog Triumph
- Producer: Röyksopp

Röyksopp chronology
The Inevitable End (2014)	Profound Mysteries (2022)	Profound Mysteries II (2022)

Singles from Profound Mysteries
- 1. "(Nothing But) Ashes..." Released: 1 January 2022; 2. "The Ladder" Released: 13 January 2022; 3. "Impossible" Released: 2 February 2022; 4. "This Time, This Place…" Released: 22 February 2022; 5. "Breathe" Released: 23 March 2022; 6. "If You Want Me" Released: 27 April 2022

Profound Mysteries is the sixth studio album by Norwegian electronic music duo Röyksopp, and is the first of three albums in the Profound Mysteries series of albums. It was released with collections of short films (each by a different director) and animated visualizations (by artist Jonathan Zawada) created to accompany each track. The album was released on 29 April 2022.

== Background and development ==
Röyksopp had stated in 2014 that their fifth studio album, The Inevitable End, would be their final release in the "traditional album format". In 2016 (with the release of the non-album single "Never Ever"), Torbjørn Brundtland from the band explained that this was because they "have many musical expressions that we want to do … but we don’t necessarily want to do an album of it," and Svein Berge, the other half of the duo, later added that because it dealt "with things ending and death" it "felt like a natural send off at that point," with them "finding new ways of releasing the music in the future."

In the years following, the band's output shifted towards remixes, collaborations, and rarities (including their Lost Tapes collection). At the end of December 2021, Röyksopp launched a new Instagram account, leading to speculation from publications such as NME that they were working on a new project. Although the account had no content posted to it at the time, its corresponding description included the message "Press R", alongside a link to an updated, interactive version of their official website, where pressing the 'R' key on their keyboards would allow users to hear new music. The account also included the instruction to check the account in the next 48 hours for "your first clue". This was followed by releases of short films for "(Nothing But) Ashes" on New Year's Day 2022 and "The Ladder" on 13 January 2022.

The band announced on 2 February 2022 that they would be releasing a new project, titled Profound Mysteries with a release date on 29 April 2022. Alongside this announcement, they revealed the album artwork (by Australian artist Jonathan Zawada) and premiered another new track, "Impossible" (featuring vocals from Alison Goldfrapp), with an "artifact and visualizer" (also by Zawada) to accompany it. The announcement described the new release as an "expanded creative universe and prodigious conceptual project," rather than a traditional album, offering the following description of its underlying concept:

"As human beings, what we don’t know vastly overshadows what we do know. As teenagers, we would discuss our own fascination and preoccupation with the infinite and the impossible – the most profound mysteries of life."

Alison Goldfrapp, who collaborated with the band on "Impossible", made a statement on the experience, describing the band as "wonderful" and saying that, having "been a fan of their music for years", she found creating the track with them to be "a fascinating joy". Goldfrapp went on to state that she "truly [hopes] everyone enjoys the track", because "there's more to come".

In February 2022, the band released a short film, The Conversation, on their YouTube channel, directed by Danish director Martin de Thurah. The film featured further new music from the project, the full version of which was released later the same day as another new track and Zawada visualizer: "This Time, This Place…", featuring vocals from Beki Mari (film director and formerly of Nouvelle Vague). Mari also released a statement regarding her experience collaborating with the group, calling it "an out of body experience" and a "divine blessing, something I shan't ever forget".

March 2022 saw the release of the project's next single, "Breathe", this time featuring Astrid S. In addition to another Zawada "visualizer", this single was also accompanied by another short film, I Hate My Shelf, which was directed by Sweden's Andreas Nilsson. Nilsson had previously worked with the band on short films for their albums Junior and Senior, as well as a music video for their single "This Must Be It" and the short film From the Journeys of Röyksopp. Like the collaborators on prior singles from Profound Mysteries, Astrid S also released a statement to coincide with the track's release, saying "I have always wanted to collaborate with Röyksopp, they have been and continue to be a huge inspiration for me."

In April 2022, Röyksopp confirmed that there would be a total of 10 short films to accompany the project: one for each of the 10 tracks. Back in January 2021, the band had reached out to the Scandinavian production company, Bacon, to establish this series of short films. Bacon's Executive Managing Producer, Magne Lygner, later informed Flood Magazine that "initially, the approach was for one director for the whole concept," with the band considering Andreas Nilsson for the role. The band later described the project as "all about the word ‘mystery,’ and also subjectivity; what the listener/viewer ‘reads’ into what they see and hear," because they “like to think that there is an ambiguous quality—sometimes even paradoxical duality" to their music and were "curious as to how the directors would experience and interpret our music without any interference or ‘background’ story from us." Talking with Creative Review, Berge explained that this concept was partially inspired by the films of David Lynch, such as 2001's Mulholland Drive, which they felt were about evoking reactions in the observer, rather than them "just… being passive."

Because scheduling constraints prevented Nilsson from taking on the entire project, instead Lygner suggested a broader collaboration, with nine of the company's directors each creating a short film to accompany one song in the collection. The band then chose the directors and which song each of them would work with, set a "very basic" set of rules ("The film needs to be at least 20 seconds long and contain some element of the track they are making the film for") before stepping back to allow those directors full creative freedom. The resulting videos were not music videos, because the audio in each film would generally not be an exact match for what is present on the album, to make it better fit with the visuals.

The sixth single from the album was released later in April 2022, two days before the album's release. "If You Want Me", featuring singer-songwriter Susanne Sundfør, was released with both another Zawada-made visualizer and another accompanying short film, Mycelium, directed by Martin Werner. Sundfør made a corresponding statement that "it’s always fun to work with the mushrooms, and I think this song and everything we’re working on at the moment is the best we’ve ever created together.”

== Critical reception ==
Professional ratings
Aggregate scores
Source	Rating
AnyDecentMusic?	7.5/10
Metacritic	82/100
Review scores
Source	Rating
Aftenposten	5/6
AllMusic	4/5 stars
Clash	9/10
iTromsø	5/6
laut.de	4/5 stars
The Line of Best Fit	8/10
Musikexpress	4/6 stars
NRK P3	5/6
PopMatters	9/10
VG	4/6

Profound Mysteries received critical acclaim from music critics. At Metacritic, which assigns a normalised rating out of 100 to reviews from mainstream publications, the album received an average score of 82, based on 5 reviews, indicating "universal acclaim".

Espen Borge of NRK P3 stated that "the duo's latest work shows an unmistakable «röyksoppian» relaxation and almost nonchalant belief in their own sound." Timothy Monger of AllMusic viewed the album as "less sonically aggressive than their previous album, Profound Mysteries still has something of an edge to it and its overall tone of ghostly enchantment makes for a strangely captivating listen" and stated that "the music is perhaps darker and more haunting than anything the band has previously released". Tallulah Boote Bond of The Line of Best Fit noted that "Röyksopp uses the treasures found on their eight year gap to create a theatrical, dramatic, literal work of art" and that the album is "a move towards a more organic electronic sound". Peter Piatkowski of PopMatters noted that the album is "transcendent" and commented on Goldfrapp's voice as an "airy, ethereal voice [that is] a perfect match for Röyksopp’s sounds."

In addition to the music, the album's accompanying video elements (both visualizers and short films) also received praise from critics, with Piatowski describing them as "a gorgeous visual interpretation of the music" and Clash Magazine's Kieran Macdonald-Brown describing the project overall as "an engaging, expressive multimedia universe suspended in digital mystery, a sum of many components meticulously executed … best experienced as an audiovisual entity, with each track forged as two sides of one coin" (though noting that "every piece of this puzzle soars in its own right").

== Track listing ==
All tracks are written by Röyksopp, except where noted.

No.	Title	Writer(s)	Length
1.	"(Nothing But) Ashes..."		1:53
2.	"The Ladder"		5:33
3.	"Impossible"	Röyksopp; Alison Goldfrapp	6:27
4.	"This Time, This Place…"	Röyksopp; Beki Mari	7:45
5.	"How the Flowers Grow"	Röyksopp; Pixx	5:43
6.	"If You Want Me"	Röyksopp; Susanne Sundfør	5:39
7.	"There, Beyond the Trees"		6:22
8.	"Breathe"	Röyksopp; Astrid S	4:36
9.	"The Mourning Sun"	Röyksopp; Sundfør	6:09
10.	"Press «R»"		0:52
Total length:			50:59

=== Accompanying short films ===
Released between January and April 2022, alongside tracks from Profound Mysteries.

No.	Title	Director	Length
1.	"(Nothing But) Ashes..."	Röyksopp	2:05
2.	"BJA"	Kasper Häggström	0:49
3.	"The Downfall"	Marc Reisbig	1:11
4.	"The Conversation"	Martin De Thurah	1:43
5.	"Hour Between"	Ida Andreasen	0:41
6.	"Mycelium"	Martin Werner	1:11
7.	"Initiation"	Martin Furze	3:36
8.	"I Hate My Shelf"	Andreas Nilsson	3:05
9.	"Dreamer"	Adam Bonke	2:07
10.	"Restart"	Christian Holm-Glad	1:10
Total length:			17:38

== Charts ==
Chart performance for Profound Mysteries
Chart (2022)	Peak position
Belgian Albums (Ultratop Flanders)	69
Belgian Albums (Ultratop Wallonia)	169
German Albums (Offizielle Top 100)	66
Norwegian Albums (VG-lista)	6
Scottish Albums (Official Charts)	25
Swiss Albums (Schweizer Hitparade)	21
UK Albums (Official Charts)	80
UK Dance Albums (Official Charts)	1
UK Independent Albums (Official Charts)	7

== Profound Mysteries Remixes ==
Profound Mysteries Remixes

Remix album by Röyksopp
- Released: 8 July 2022
- Genres: Electropop; electronica; dance; Melodic house & techno
- Length: 53:40
- Label: Dog Triumph
- Producer: Röyksopp

Röyksopp chronology
Profound Mysteries (2022)	Profound Mysteries Remixes (2022)	Profound Mysteries II (2022)

Singles from Profound Mysteries Remixes
- 1. "Breathe (Röyksopp remix)" Released: 20 May 2022; 2. "How the Flowers Grow (Rodriguez Jr. remix)" Released: 6 July 2022; 3. "Impossible (&Me remix)" Released: 6 July 2022; 4. "This Time, This Place... (Henry Saiz mixes)" Released: 6 July 2022; 5. "This Time, This Place... (Township Rebellion remix)" Released: 6 July 2022

A remix album was released on 8 July, featuring remixes from &Me, Rodriguez Jr., Township Rebellion and Henry Saiz.

=== Track listing ===
No.	Title	Remixer(s)	Length
1.	"Impossible"	&Me	9:15
2.	"How the Flowers Grow"	Rodriguez Jr.	5:38
3.	"This Time, This Place..."	Township Rebellion	8:05
4.	"This Time, This Place..." (Darktrip remix)	Henry Saiz	7:57
5.	"This Time, This Place..." (Downtempo Egodeath version)	Henry Saiz	8:14
6.	"This Time, This Place..."	Henry Saiz	7:02
7.	"Breathe"	Röyksopp	7:25
Total length:			53:40
