= The Irrepressibles =

British musician

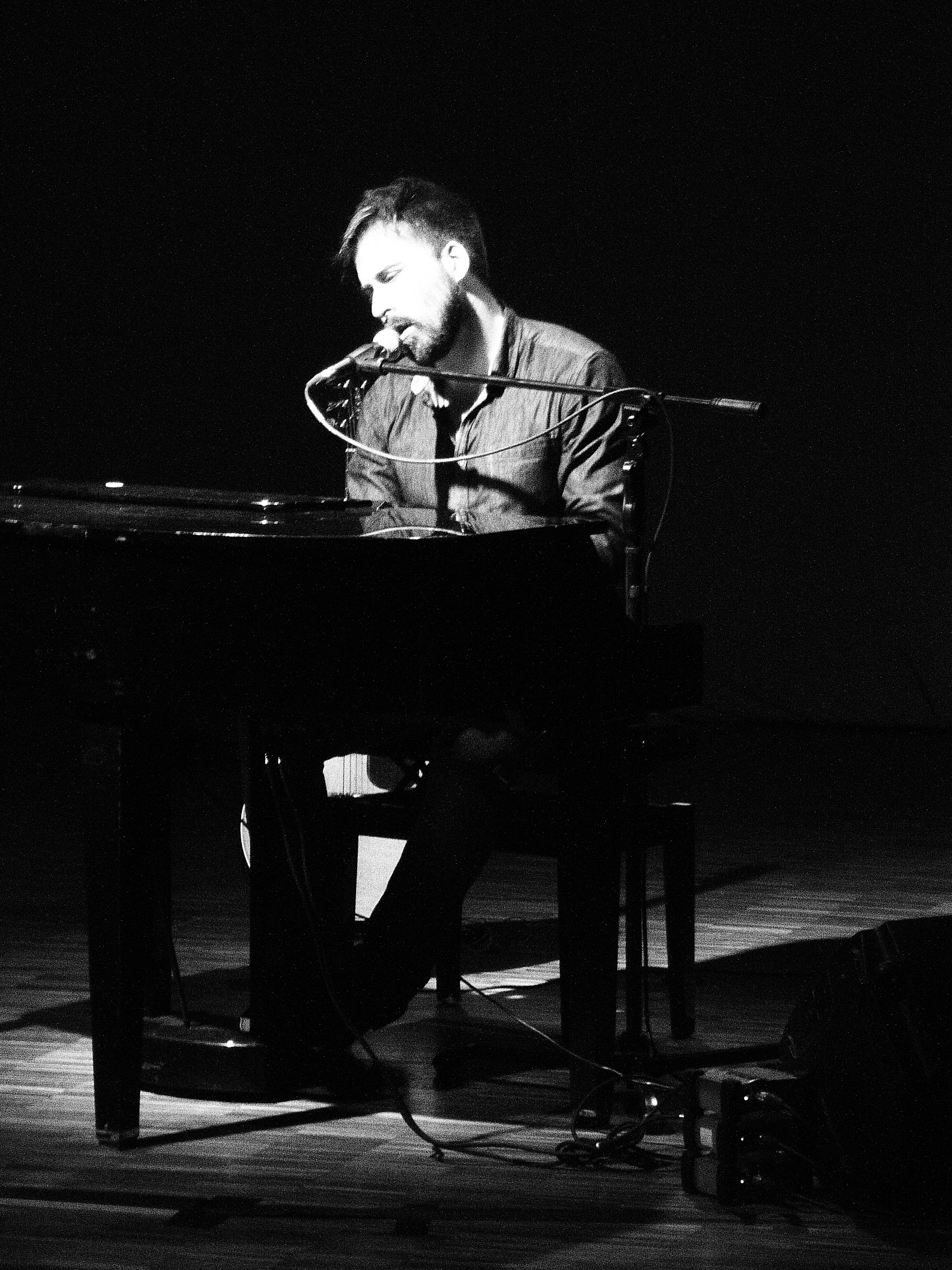
- Jamie McDermott performing in 2013

Background information
- Origin: Scarborough, North Yorkshire, UK
- Genres: Alternative rock; orchestral; chamber pop; ambient; electronic
- Years active: 2002–present
- Label: OND Recordings
- Members: Jamie Irrepressible

The Irrepressibles is the creative guise of British musician Jamie McDermott (also known as Jamie Irrepressible).

== History ==
Formed in 2002, the Irrepressibles have released four full studio albums and six EPs. All songs are written by Jamie Irrepressible. According to the musician, the project's name is "about breaking boundaries in music and being honest about being gay in music". Based in London, England, for many years, Irrepressible currently works from Manchester, after a period in Berlin, Germany. The artist changed his name from "Jamie McDermott" to "Jamie Irrepressible" in 2013, on his collaboration with Norwegian electronic duo Röyksopp.

=== 2009: From the Circus to the Sea ===
The project's first release was the soundtrack to Shelly Love's The Forgotten Circus, issued in January 2009. The Independent described the group as one of Britain's best-kept secrets.

=== 2010: Mirror Mirror ===
On 11 January 2010, the Irrepressibles released their debut studio album, Mirror Mirror, a collection of twelve baroque pop songs produced by Dimitri Tikovoi and William Turner Duffin and written by Jamie McDermott. The album features the single "In This Shirt".

Mirror Mirror received critical acclaim. The Guardian called it "theatrical and very different, a ripe, colourful riposte to all that is Cowell", and The Independent described it as "a dramatic soundscape dripping with echoes of the Weimar Republic and Belle Époque."

=== "In This Shirt" ===
The track "In This Shirt" garnered critical and public acclaim after it was used as the soundtrack for the short film The Lady Is Dead, by Israeli production company PAG Films, which Sundance Channel described as "fantastic". It was remixed by various artists, including Röyksopp, Hercules & Love Affair, and Zero 7.

The song received renewed attention in 2018, when it was used by French figure skater Kévin Aymoz as his free-skating program. It again gained prominence in 2020, through its widespread use in videos on TikTok during the COVID-19 pandemic.

=== 2012: Nude ===
In November 2012, the Irrepressibles released their second album, Nude. Self-produced by McDermott, the record received critical acclaim. The Quietus described it as a "remarkably varied and unpredictable album", stating that "the results border on the spectacular". The Independent gave it 4 out of 5 stars, calling it "an act of bravery in a cowardly world", where McDermott "heralds homosexual love as a heroic, romantic and redemptive force".

=== Nude EPs ===
2013 saw the release of Nude: Landscapes, the first of three EPs inspired by—and expanding on—the band's second album. This first EP saw the band take a "minimal symphonic" and "acoustic" direction, as described by McDermott in an interview with QX magazine. The second EP, Nude: Viscera, released on 14 February 2014, "brings together influences from new wave, grunge, and exotica". The third EP, Nude: Forbidden, was released on 6 April 2014.

=== 2018: Third album: Superheroes ===
On 31 May 2018, the Irrepressibles released a new single, "Submission", from their forthcoming third album. The video, directed by Cypriot filmmaker Savvas Stavrou, was featured on Nowness. A second single, "Dominance", was released on 22 November 2018. The visuals, a collaboration between Italian photographer Paride Mirabilio and Turkish director Mertcan Mertbilek, were featured on the website Pornceptual. A third single, "Anxiety", was released on 29 November 2018 and a fourth, "International", on 22 March 2019. The video for the latest track was directed by Jamie Irrepressible, in collaboration with Ukrainian director Alexey Romanowski, and was featured by New Noise Magazine. A fifth single, "Let Go (Everybody Move Your Body Listen to Your Heart)", was released on 27 March 2020 and described by Clash as "an absolute bulldozer — a stunning pop missile that explodes staid sexual norms." A video for it was directed by Savvas Stavrou and featured in Kaltblut magazine. A sixth single, "The Most Beautiful Boy (Strong Outside a Man but Inside a Boy)", was published on 23 July 2020, alongside the album. The record was acclaimed by the media, with Loud and Quiet describing it as "cleverly inflecting the central romance with incisive commentary on masculinity and mental health." The Quietus stated it was "hard not to fall in love with this album" and a "beautiful open book of his journey uniting with his mental health, masculinity and homosexuality".

In 2022, a reinterpretation of "The Most Beautiful Boy" by Felsmann + Tiley was featured in the Swedish LGBT teen drama Young Royals, appearing in two episodes as well as the official trailer. Speaking with Tunefind, the show's music supervisor, Magnus Palmborg, described it as "such a beautiful and unique song and it really defined the complicated love between our two main characters in the show".

=== 2024: Yo Homo ===
On 12 April 2024, the Irrepressibles released a new single, "Will You?", taken from their fourth album, Yo Homo. The video, directed by Will Kennedy, was featured in Attitude magazine, who described it as "an anthem full of pent-up sexual tension". McDermott described the song as being about "an encounter: homosexual allure, the intensity of desire... the fear is in the strings... the sexual tension in the drums... and the drive in the bass and distorted guitars. It's a track that lifts from intensity to abandon." The forthcoming album's second single, "Yo Homo", was released on 24 May 2024. The video was featured in Playy magazine. Joseph Wilson, who directed it, stated that "'Yo Homo' explores the rage of queer youth and the power of community. The song takes me back to my teens, when I would get drunk in skateparks and go wild in mosh pits at local rock shows. It's the song I wish I knew when I was 16, and the song I listen to now with pride and sweet nostalgia".

On 25 July 2024, the Irrepressibles released a new single, "Ecstasy Homosexuality". Kaltblut magazine wrote. "'Ecstasy Homosexuality' isn't just a song — it's a movement. It's drenched in raw emotion, tackling themes of homosexual desire and sexuality with an audacious flair...Dropped during Pride Month, this single isn't just another release; it's a clarion call for love, acceptance, and radical equality." Container Love, a queer cultural creative studio, developed the music video. On 12 September, the band released "In the Rhythm" alongside a video by LA-based director Sam McGuire, as well as "Destination", with a video by Jack Willoughby. Yo Homo came out on 27 September and was featured among The Guardian's albums of the week.

=== Collaborations ===
In 2012, McDermott collaborated with Hotel Pro Forma and the Latvian Radio Choir on WAR SUM UP. The project toured extensively worldwide, receiving acclaim from Danish outlet Gaffa as well as The New York Times. In 2013, McDermott provided guest vocals on Rex the Dog's single "Do You Feel What I Feel" as well as Röyksopp's singles "Something in My Heart" and "Twenty Thirteen". In 2014, he also featured on Röyksopp's album The Inevitable End, on the tracks "You Know I Have to Go", "I Had This Thing", "Here She Comes Again", and "Compulsion", in addition to the previously released "Something in My Heart", on which he was credited for the first time as Jamie Irrepressible. In 2015, having relocated to Berlin, McDermott began working with American alternative country artist Jon Campbell and produced his debut EP, released in 2016. In 2021, McDermott featured on Dutch duo Tinlicker's track "You Take My Hand". He also appeared on several tracks of Röyksopp's 2022 triple-album project, Profound Mysteries.

== Studio band/musicians ==
=== 2009: From the Circus to the Sea ===
- Charlie Stock – viola, backing vocals
- Jordan Hunt – violin, backing vocals
- Sophie Li – double bass, backing vocals
- Nicole Robson – cello, backing vocals
- Sarah Tobias – clarinet, saxophone, backing vocals
- Sarah Kershaw – piano, church organ, backing vocals
- Gary Hughes – flute, backing vocals
- Olivia Duque – oboe, backing vocals
- Jamil Reyes – orchestral percussion, vibraphone, glockenspiel, backing vocals

=== 2010: Mirror Mirror ===
- Jamil Reyes – orchestral percussion, vibraphone, glockenspiel, backing vocals
- Charlie Stock – viola, backing vocals
- Jordan Hunt – violin, backing vocals
- Sophie Li – double bass, backing vocals
- Nicole Robson – cello, backing vocals
- Sarah Tobias – clarinet, saxophone, backing vocals
- Sarah Kershaw – piano, church organ, backing vocals
- Gary Hughes – flute, backing vocals
- Olivia Duque – oboe, backing vocals

=== 2012: Nude ===
- Jamie McDermott – lead vocals, electric and acoustic guitars, piano, synthesizers, drum programming
- Jordan Hunt – violin, backing vocals
- Charlie Stock – viola, backing vocals
- Sophie Li – double bass, backing vocals
- Nicole Robson – cello, backing vocals
- Sarah Kershaw – piano, backing vocals
- Ian Tripp – drums, backing vocals
- James Field – drums, backing vocals
- Robbie Wilson – programming, audio manipulation

== Live musicians ==
2010: Mirror Mirror

- Craig White – oboe, backing vocals
- Rosie Reed – flute, backing vocals
- Anna Westlake – clarinet, saxophone, backing vocals
- Amy Kelly – orchestral percussion, vibraphone, glockenspiel, backing vocals
- Charlie Stock – viola, backing vocals
- Jordan Hunt – violin, backing vocals
- Sophie Li – double bass, backing vocals
- Nicole Robson – cello, backing vocals
- James Field – drums, backing vocals

2012: Nude

- Ian Tripp – drums, backing vocals
- Charlie Stock – viola, backing vocals
- Jordan Hunt – violin, backing vocals
- Sophie Li – double Bass, backing vocals
- Nicole Robson – cello, backing vocals
- James Field – drums, backing vocals
- Chloe Treacher – cello, backing vocals

2014: Nude EPs

- Sarah Kershaw – piano, backing vocals
- Chloe Treacher – cello, bass, backing vocals
- Ollie Hipkin – drums, backing vocals
- Apollo – violin, backing vocals

== Discography ==
=== Studio albums ===
- Mirror Mirror (2010)
- Nude (2012)
- Superheroes (2020)
- Yo Homo (2024)

=== EPs ===
- My Witness (2005)
- Knife Song (2005)
- From the Circus to the Sea EP & DVD (2009)
- Nude: Landscapes (2013)
- Nude: Viscera (2014)
- Nude: Forbidden (2014)
- Self Love & Acceptance (2023)
- What I Am! Queer (2025)

=== Singles ===
- "In This Shirt" (2010)
- "Two Men in Love" (2012)
- "New World" (2012)
- "Arrow" (2012)
- "Submission" (2018)
- "Anxiety" (2018)
- "Dominance" (2018)
- "International" (2019)
- "Will You?" (2024)
- "Yo Homo" (2024)

=== Music videos ===
- "I'll Maybe Let You" (directed by J. J. Stevens)
- "Arrow" (directed by Jamie McDermott)
- "New World" (directed by McDermott)
- "Two Men in Love" (directed McDermott)
- "Forbidden" (directed by McDermott)
- "Edge of Now" (directed by McDermott)
- "Submission" (directed by Savvas Stavrou)
- "International" (directed by McDermott and Alexey Romanowski)
- "Calling for Change" (directed by Joel Ryan McDermott)
- "Let Go (Everybody Move Your Body Listen to Your Heart)" (directed by Stavrou)
- "The Most Beautiful Boy (Strong Outside a Man but Inside a Boy)" (directed by Stavrou)
- "Will You?" (directed by Will Kennedy)
- "Yo Homo" (directed by Joseph Wilson)
