= Röyksopp's Night Out =

2006 live EP by Röyksopp

EP by Röyksopp
- Released: 27 January 2006
- Recorded: November 2005
- Venue: Rockefeller Music Hall (Oslo, Norway)
- Length: 39:34
- Label: Wall of Sound
- Producer: Röyksopp

Röyksopp chronology
The Understanding (2005)	Röyksopp's Night Out (2006)	Back to Mine: Röyksopp (2007)

Professional ratings
Review scores
Source	Rating
AllMusic	3/5 stars
Drowned in Sound	7/10
Pitchfork	6.2/10

Röyksopp's Night Out is an extended play (EP) by Norwegian electronic music duo Röyksopp. It contains live recordings from the duo's concert at Rockefeller Music Hall in Oslo, Norway, in November 2005.

== Background ==
The EP was released domestically on 27 January 2006. Röyksopp has stated that the EP was originally meant for the Japanese fans, the most enthusiastic Röyksopp fans, according to the band members. All of the vocalists who contributed on Röyksopp's second studio album, The Understanding (2005), except Karin Dreijer (who was replaced by Norwegian singer Anneli Drecker) were present at the concert. The EP also includes a remixed cover version of the Queens of the Stone Age song "Go with the Flow".

The EP was named after a song from their debut album, Melody A.M. (2001), though the song was not performed.

== Track listing ==
No.	Title	Writer(s)	Length
1.	"What Else Is There?"	Röyksopp; Karin Dreijer	3:19
2.	"Only This Moment"	Röyksopp	4:04
3.	"Remind Me"	Röyksopp; Erlend Øye	3:47
4.	"Sparks"	Röyksopp; Anneli Drecker	5:01
5.	"Poor Leno" (Istanbul Forever Take)	Röyksopp; Øye	5:31
6.	"Go Away"	Röyksopp; Chelonis R. Jones	5:35
7.	"Alpha Male"	Röyksopp	8:03
8.	"Go with the Flow"	Josh Homme; Nick Oliveri	3:12
9.	"Teppefall"	Röyksopp	0:59

== Personnel ==
Credits adapted from the liner notes of Röyksopp's Night Out.

Röyksopp

- Röyksopp – arrangements, production (all tracks); vocals (tracks 2, 3)
- Svein Berge – vocals (track 8)

Additional personnel

- Ronald Hernes – recording
- Tim Summerhayes – mixing
- Dave O'Carrol – mastering
- Kate Havnevik – creative input, vocals (track 2)
- Kristian Stockhaus – guitar (tracks 2, 3, 5, 7, 8)
- Ole Vegard Skauge – bass guitar (tracks 1–3, 7, 8)
- Anneli Drecker – vocals (track 1, 4)
- Chelonis R. Jones – vocals (track 6)
- Stian Andersen – photos
- Jean-Louis Duralek – artwork

== Charts ==
Chart (2006)	Peak position
Belgian Albums (Ultratop Flanders)	76
Denmark (Tracklisten)	3
Italian Albums (FIMI)	94
Norway (VG-lista)	8
