= List of big beat artists =

This is a list of big beat artists, a genre that usually uses heavy breakbeats and synthesizer-generated loops and patterns. Big beat achieved mainstream success during the 1990s and early 2000s, but declined in popularity by 2001.

- The Aloof
- All Seeing I
- Apollo 440
- Arkarna
- Asian Dub Foundation
- Audio Bullys
- Basement Jaxx
- Bentley Rhythm Ace
- Big Bang
- Boom Boom Satellites
- Jon Carter (also produced as Monkey Mafia)
- Chase & Status
- The Chemical Brothers
- Cirrus
- The Crystal Method
- Cut La Roc
- Depth Charge
- Evil Nine
- Fatboy Slim
- Fluke
- Freddy Fresh
- Adam Freeland
- Freestylers
- GRiZ
- Groove Armada
- Hardknox
- Hervé
- Hideki Naganuma
- Junkie XL
- Lionrock
- Lo Fidelity Allstars
- Lunatic Calm
- Timo Maas
- Midfield General
- Paul Oakenfold
- Rob Overseer
- The Prodigy
- Propellerheads
- Tzant
- Überzone
- Armand Van Helden
- Way Out West
- Josh Wink
- The Wiseguys
- UK ARROW HAMMER & ANVIL RECORDINGS
