= Where the Wild Things Are (Agent Provocateur album) =

Studio album by Agent Provocateur
- Released: May 5, 1997
- Genre: Breakbeat, big beat
- Label: Wall of Sound, Epic Records
- Producer: Danny Saber

Professional ratings
Review scores
| Source | Rating |
|---|---|
| Muzik | 3/10 |

Where the Wild Things Are is the debut album by the British band Agent Provocateur. The song "Red Tape" was featured in The Jackal and on the original score of the Underworld soundtrack.

== Track listing ==
1. "Red Tape" (5:20)
2. "Spinning" (3:45)
3. "Agent Dan" (5:28)
4. "Kicks" (5:00)
5. "You're No Good" (2:56)
6. "Sabotage" (4:38)
7. "Elvis Economics" (7:41)
8. "Sandpit" (4:50)
9. "Hercules" (4:02)
10. "Dumb" (3:44)
11. "Red Tape" (the Janitor Remix) (6:08)
12. "Agent Dan" (Propellerheads Remix) (4:48)
13. "Sabotage" (Monkey Mafia Bastard Remix) (6:43)
14. "Dumb" (Mekon Remix) (4:41)

== Personnel ==
Agent Provocateur

- Cleo Torres - vocals
- Matthew Ashman - guitar, bass guitar, Vox organ, backing vocals
- Danny Saber - guitar, bass guitar, keyboards, beats
- Dan Peppe - bass guitar
- John Gosling - keyboards, breaks, scratches
- Neil Conti - drums
- Ged Lynch - percussion, drums

with:

- Shaun Ryder - vocals on "Agent Dan"
- Mad Frankie Fraser - vocals on "Sandpit"
- Mark Rutherford - keyboards on "Red Tape"
- Joe Strummer - guitar on "Dumb"
- Jim Whelan - guitar on "Spinning" and "You're No Good"
- Simon "Palmskin" Richmond - drums on "You're No Good"
- Dominic Evans - vocals on "Dumb"

Technical

- Mark Baker - photography
- Robert Hill - engineer
- Jon Carter - remixing
