= On the Floor at the Boutique – Volume 3 =

On the Floor at the Boutique

Live album by Midfield General
- Released: 2000
- Recorded: 1999
- Genres: Big beat, funk, hip hop, acid house
- Length: 73:18
- Label: Skint

Professional ratings
Review scores
Source	Rating
Allmusic	link

On the Floor at the Boutique – Volume 3 is a live album mixed by Midfield General. It was recorded at the Big Beat Boutique in 1999 in Brighton, England and released in 2000.

== Track listing ==
1. "90% of Me Is You" by Gwen McCrae – 2:06
2. "Cold Getting Dumb" by Just Ice – 2:33
3. "Devious Mind" by Bumpy Knuckles – 3:03
4. "Don't Give a Damn" by Mulder – 3:56
5. "Breakdance" by Prisoners Of Technology – 3:43
6. "Pony Pressure" by Lo Fidelity Allstars – 4:02
7. "It Won't Be Long" (Midfield General Remix) by Super Collider – 3:33
8. "Trunk of Funk" by The Bureau – 1:29
9. "Waxadelica" by Wax Assassins – 3:03
10. "Tied Up" by LFO – 2:26
11. "Chord Memory" (Daft Punk Remix) by Ian Pooley – 4:07
12. "Schlam Me" by Idjut Boys And Quakerman – 2:37
13. "Inside Out" by Inner City – 3:09
14. "Ulysses" (Harvey's Crowd Control Mix) by Extended Family – 3:13
15. "SE15 (Taking Liberties)" by Freq Nasty – 2:31
16. "High-Way" by DJ Natsu – 4:59
17. "General of the Midfield" by Midfield General – 5:47
18. "Rise" by Speedy J – 8:24
19. "Life on Mars" by Dexter Wansel – 4:55
20. "This Will Be (An Everlasting Love)" by Natalie Cole – 2:43

== See also ==
- On the Floor at the Boutique
- On the Floor at the Boutique – Volume 2
