= One (Req album) =

Studio album by Req
- Released: 24 February 1997
- Recorded: September 1995–1996
- Genres: Downtempo; trip hop; big beat; IDM; instrumental hip hop; ambient; lo-fi; experimental
- Length: 71:06
- Label: Skint Records
- Producer: Req

Req chronology
| One (1997) | Frequency Jams (1998) |

One (also known as Req One) is the debut studio album by English experimental electronic producer Req, recorded from September 1995 to 1996 and released on Skint Records in 1997. After releasing several EPs, Req decided to release an album to spread his sound. His conception for One was to create music that hints at a direction without ever arriving at one. Music critics had difficulty defining the album's style, and is seen as a "blunted take" on trip hop with downtempo ambience. The album was well received by critics, who praised its unique sound and production. Today, it is seen as a predecessor to the late 1990s' "intelligent big beat" of fellow Skint artists such as Lo-Fidelity Allstars, and in 2015, Fact named the album the 14th greatest trip hop album of all time.

== Background ==
Brighton-based producer Ian Cassar, working under the pseudonym Req (phonetic for "wreck"), began as a graffiti artist in 1984 after watching the hip hop Beat Street tour, and became among the most lauded graffiti artists in the United Kingdom. Although without any formal musical training, he bedroom DJ'd for many years which "refined his instinct for effective composition". However, he only began producing his own music in his late twenties during the mid-1990s. In 1995, he signed to newly established, local big beat record label Skint Records, who issued his first release, the downtempo Req's Garden E.P. (1995), led by the track "Razzamatazz", which later featured on One. The EP established Req's sound, "combining a warped, abstract approach to sampled breaks with a knack for extracting a haunting moodiness out of even the most minimal of electronic and sampledelic soundscapes."

Req followed the EP the release with the Fantasy Roc E.P. (1996), which contained future One track "Subculture", and the "Miracles" single, also from 1996. After these releases, he dedicated his time to recording his debut album. He conceived One in the album format in order to "spread his sound out a bit." The recordings on the album were made between September 1995 and 1996, using a lo-fi Tascam home 4-track recorder, and were mastered by fellow Skint producer Simon Thornton. During production, Req allowed Skint to use "Razzamatazz" on their big beat various artists album Brassic Beats Volume One (1996). Req considered One and the preceding EPs to be the "audio extension" of his graffiti work.

== Music ==
"His compositions didn't pander to the popularity of the growing trip-hop scene, instead dwelling in a noisy, near-ambient back room."

— Fact on One

Req's intention for the music on One was to "hint at a direction without ever actually settling down into one." Sean Cooper of AllMusic said the album is "an alternating collection of rooted, downtempo beat music and floaty, meandering ambience." Alongside Req's next album Frequency Jams, he later referred to One as "a blurry, choppy assemblage of fractured rhythms and lo-fi Tascam experimentalism." Fact, however, saw the album as a "blunted take" on trip hop, a style they felt he created "almost by accident": "He made hip-hop instrumentals that sounded like they were being beamed in from a parallel universe via 14.4kbps modem, and in doing so, avoided being both pigeonholed." Writing in The Wire, Simon Reynolds felt the album represented what could become "that oxymoron-in-waiting, 'intelligent big beat'," a term he would apply to later day Skint artists like Lo-Fidelity Allstars.

== Release and reception ==
Professional ratings
Review scores
| Source | Rating |
|---|---|
| AllMusic | 3/5 stars |
| Muzik | 7/10 |
| NME | 8/10 |

One was released on 24 February 1997 by Skint Records as an LP and a gatefold digipak CD. The album artwork, designed by Req and graphic design company Red Design, depicts a wraparound photograph of one of Req's graffiti artworks, photographed by the album's engineer Simon Thornton. Req spent 1997 promoting the album and recording its follow up, Frequency Jams, which was released in February 1998.

The album was released to positive reviews from critics. Sean Cooper of AllMusic felt the album's concept was "an interesting approach" where, although "one would expect to prompt self-righteous cries of 'Muso!'," Req's "inspired amateurism is too honest and freeflowing to warrant it." He felt that although the album could be "pretty samey-sounding," it was "a good listen." He later called it "undersung." Simon Reynolds, writing for The Wire, included One in his "Faves of 1997" list, saying the album's best moments resemble "an ambient version of Schoolly D's first album," and noted that the album escapes being close to "Mo' Wax-style fetishism" because of this. The album was also highly praised by other staff from The Wire, and by production duo Coldcut.

In 2015, Fact ranked the album at number 14 in their list of "The 50 Best Trip-Hop Albums of All Time"; the magazine called the album a "brilliant debut" and said it "has barely dated, fitting as well alongside DJ Spooky or even Dälek as it does anything the Bristol scene had to offer. One sounds, at times, like an MPC tumbling down a distant stairwell into a muddy lake, and we couldn’t think of a better recommendation than that." The magazine speculated that the album's abstractness prevented Req from becoming popular. In his 1999 book Generation Ecstasy: Into the World of Techno and Rave Culture, Simon Reynolds called One a defining big beat release. In an interview with The Quietus, techno producer Lee Gamble cited the album, alongside several others, as one of his "favorite records" and a "timeless record", noting its influence in his own work.

== Track listing ==
All tracks are written by Req.

| No. | Title | Length |
|---|---|---|
| 1. | "Cars Girls Money Too" | 2:56 |
| 2. | "New Intro" | 3:56 |
| 3. | "Razzamatazz" | 5:03 |
| 4. | "Cash Money Green" | 6:55 |
| 5. | "Itchin" | 4:36 |
| 6. | "Supreme Kit" | 7:51 |
| 7. | "Bell Ambient" | 3:16 |
| 8. | "Rain" | 8:45 |
| 9. | "Piano Break" | 6:46 |
| 10. | "Subculture" | 6:13 |
| 11. | "Beat Box" | 6:52 |
| 12. | "Stalking" | 7:55 |

== Personnel ==
Credits adapted from liner notes.

- Req – music, design
- Red Design – design
- Simon Thornton – mastering, photography
