= On the Floor at the Boutique – Volume 2 =

On the Floor at the Boutique

Live album by Lo Fidelity Allstars
- Released: 2000
- Recorded: 1999
- Genres: Big beat, funk, hip hop, acid house
- Length: 73:18
- Label: Skint

Lo Fidelity Allstars chronology
How to Operate with a Blown Mind (1998)	On the Floor at the Boutique (2000)	Don't Be Afraid of Love (2002)

Professional ratings
Review scores
Source	Rating
AllMusic	4/5 stars
Rolling Stone Album Guide	4/5 stars

On the Floor at the Boutique – Volume 2 is a DJ mix by the Lo Fidelity Allstars released as a compilation album in 2000. It was recorded at the Big Beat Boutique in 1999 in Brighton, England. Signa

== Track listing ==
1. "You're Never Alone with a Clone" / "No Diggity" by Lo Fidelity Allstars and Blackstreet – 5:44
2. "Stand Clear" by Indian Ropeman – 2:36
3. "Pump Me Up" by Trouble Funk – 2:03
4. "You Must Learn (Live from Caucus Mountain Remix)" by Boogie Down Productions – 4:56
5. "Levitation" by Runaways – 2:27
6. "Raw Element" by Dirt – 4:10
7. "Darn (Cold Way o' Lovin')" by Super_Collider – 2:42
8. "What Is It?" by Wildstyle Bob Nimble – 1:26
9. "Black Is Black (Ultimatum Mix)" by Jungle Brothers – 2:36
10. "(Hey You) What That Sound?" by Les Rythmes Digitales – 1:26
11. "(I Need The) Disko Doktor" by Space Raiders – 1:49
12. "Stakker Humanoid" by Humanoid – 3:32
13. "20 Seconds to Comply" by Silver Bullet – 5:02
14. "The Funk Phenomena (Johnickennydope Mastermix)" by Armand Van Helden – 3:31
15. "Makin' It Happen" by Jackson & His Computer Band – 4:59
16. "Many Tentacles Pimping on the Keys" by Lo Fidelity Allstars – 5:33
17. "The Whole Church Should Get Drunk" by The Feelgood Factor – 6:26
18. "I Can Feel Your Love" by Felice Taylor – 2:51
19. "Be Young, Be Foolish, Be Happy" by The Tams – 2:13
20. "Out of Space" by The Prodigy – 4:47
21. "Bootsy Call" by Lo Fidelity Allstars – 0:48

== See also ==
- On the Floor at the Boutique
- On the Floor at the Boutique – Volume 3
