= Shoot the Boss =

Studio album by Monkey Mafia
- Released: 4 May 1998
- Studio: The Cockpit; Orinoco Studios, London; Rollover Studios, London; Sabresonic Studio, London
- Genre: Electronic; big beat; dancehall
- Length: 72:20
- Label: Heavenly (UK); Arista (US)
- Producer: Jon Carter

Singles from Shoot the Boss
- 1. "Blow the Whole Joint Up" Released: 1995; 2. "Work Mi Body" Released: June 1996; 3. "Lion in the Hall" Released: 26 May 1997 (as lead track of the 15 Steps EP); 4. "Long As I Can See the Light" Released: 27 April 1998

Shoot the Boss is the sole album by Monkey Mafia, released in the UK on Heavenly Records on 4 May 1998, and in the US on Arista Records on 13 October 1998. The album includes versions of all four of Monkey Mafia's singles. The album cover and artwork throughout features photographs of the 1965 Watts Riots.

British DJ Jon Carter originally started using the pseudonym Monkey Mafia in 1994 for his dub and dancehall-inspired music productions. By the time the album was released, Monkey Mafia had expanded into a full band, including Douge Reuben on vocals, Dan Peppe on bass, Tom Symmons on drums, DJ Krash Slaughta (a.k.a. Paul Smith) on turntables, and Carter himself on samplers and keyboard programming. The band played the songs live at clubs and music festivals, including tours supporting Roni Size Reprazent in 1997 and Massive Attack in 1999. However, they disbanded in 2000 as Carter increasingly began to concentrate on his DJing career. Carter revived the Monkey Mafia name for a one-off single titled "Royal Ascot" in 2012.

== Critical reception ==
Professional ratings
Review scores
Source	Rating
AllMusic	4/5 stars
NME	7/10
Pitchfork Media	7.8/10
Rolling Stone	3.5/5 stars
Spin	7/10

Reviews for the album were generally favourable. NME described the album's opening as "gut-stabbingly groovy stuff" but was disappointed when the pace slowed midway through the album, concluding "you have to applaud the boy Carter's intermittent touch of genius. Otherwise, you're bound to conclude that if they'd curtailed a third of the 72 minutes, it would be a much more consistent and vibey listen". In the US Shoot the Boss was well-received, with reviewers hailing the record's rough edges and reggae influences as a refreshing alternative to current dance music. Rolling Stone claimed that the album boasts "deep and dubby dance mixes, reggae toasting and puréed sample soups thick enough to clog a speaker", and has "a ragged, street-smart edge too seldom found on the polished postmodern dance floor".

Spin declared that "Monkey's Mafia's first full-length is a delightfully messy and rambunctious effort... Shoot the Boss captures the spirit of contemporary British multiculture in a way that really hasn't been accomplished since the end of the '70s – when the Clash, the Slits, Mark Stewart of the Pop Group, and other punky-reggae types discovered the vast legacy of Jamaican music." The A.V. Club called the record "a tough-sounding but danceable and highly musical mini-revolt" and praised Carter for standing out from the other big beat artists of the time, saying, "his music is much more diverse and satisfying... his songs never veer far from the music he loves, and the album doesn't make lazy concessions to the charts or the clubs". AllMusic stated that "Shoot the Boss shows that although Carter is interested in electronic dance, he wants to also keep a 'human' element to his music" and that by including a full band "Monkey Mafia contains the best of both worlds".

== Track listing ==
All tracks are written by Jon Carter, except where noted.

No.	Title	Length
1.	"Make Jah Music"	7:06
2.	"Blow the Whole Joint Up (Coughing Up Fire Mix)" (Barry Ashworth, Carter)	5:18
3.	"I Am Fresh" (Carter, Douge Reuben)	4:49
4.	"Lion in the Hall (Beats Edit)"	5:34
5.	"Steppa's Ball"	5:52
6.	"Work Mi Body (Chicken Scratch Mix)" (Carter, Kelly, Ramans, Dorothy Smith)	5:59
7.	"Ward 10 (Voodoo Mix)" (Richard Brown, Carter)	5:47
8.	"The Whore of Babylon"	8:32
9.	"Metro Love"	5:23
10.	"Healing of the Nation" (Carter, Reuben)	5:57
11.	"Retreat Wicked Man" (Carter, Garnett Smith)	5:56
12.	"Long As I Can See the Light" (John Fogerty)	6:07
Total length:		72:20

== Personnel ==
- Jon Carter – samples and production
- Lee Horsley – keyboards on "Long As I Can See the Light"
- Patra – vocals on "Work Mi Body"
- Douge Reuben – vocals on "I Am Fresh" and "Healing of the Nation"
- Shirzelle – vocals on "Long As I Can See the Light"
- Silvah Bullet – vocals on "Ward 10"
- Sonia Slany – strings on "Make Jah Music"
- Krash Slaughta – decknology on "Work Mi Body"
- Lee Spencer – "analogue mayhem" on "Blow the Whole Joint Up"
