= Give 'Em Enough Dope Volume One =

Compilation album by various artists
- Released: 30 June 1994
- Genres: Acid jazz; trip hop
- Length: 70:46
- Label: Wall of Sound
- Producer: Various
- Compiler: Mark Jones

Give 'Em Enough Dope chronology
Give 'Em Enough Dope Volume One (1994)	Give 'Em Enough Dope Volume Two (1995)

Give 'Em Enough Dope Volume One is a compilation album of music by various artists released in 1994 by British electronic label Wall of Sound as their first release. The idea for the album came when Wall of Sound's founder, Mark Jones, wanted to release a compilation of hard-to-find music by unsigned artists, with whom he had worked with via his distribution and pressing deals, so that the music could be heard by a wider audience. He picked his favourite such tracks which there was already an audience for and this became the compilation.

The album has been described as trip hop and acid jazz and contains music that straddles different genres such as jazz, funk and soul, serving as a document of several electronic genres emerging at the time which incorporated sampling and live instrumentation. Upon release, the album was one of only several "alternative" electronic compilations and became a critical success, with critics finding its disparate styles to flow well together. Two successful sequels were released in the ensuing years and the album has been credited as an influential predecessor to big beat music.

== Background ==
During the early-to-mid 1990s, while Mark Jones was working for Soul Trader, a London-based record distributor owned by his friend Marc Lessner, he and Lessner started the Wall of Sound record label by arranging "pressing and distribution" (P&D) deals for unsigned electronic musicians that Jones and Lessner enjoyed the work of. "This is how we found Kruder & Dorfmeister, Howie B, Pussy Foot and Basement Jaxx," noted Jones, "artists that have went on to have quite a bit of success." The idea for Give 'Em Enough Dope Volume One came when Jones suggested to Lessner that they compile a compilation album of "all the music that we work with and material that we know people want and can't get."

As the label had yet to release any music yet, Give 'Em Enough Dope Volume One became Wall of Sound’s first release. Jones recalled of the album’s conception, “I didn’t have a big masterplan; it was just a natural progression of the work I was doing and where I was working. Writer Siân Pattenden later reflected on the scenario: "[Jones] would hear tracks by trendy artists working in bedroom studios, which were released by Soul Trader. Jones thought the tunes needed to be heard by a wider audience, so he got his favourite tracks and released them as a compilation album." The album was inspired by Headz (1994), a compilation album released by trip hop label Mo' Wax that features abstract hip hop music.

== Music ==
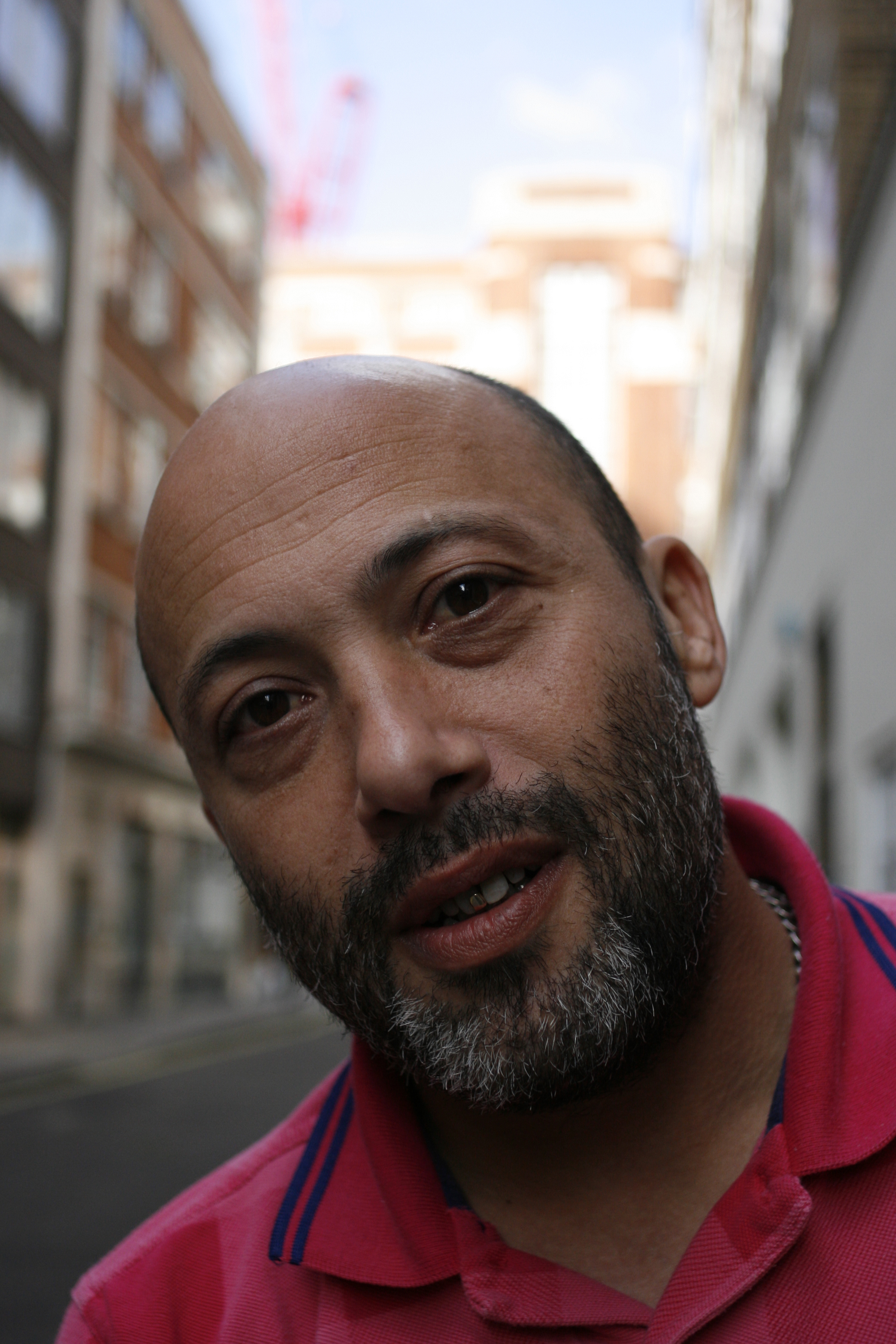
Howie B in 2007.

Give 'Em Enough Dope Volume One coincided with the development of numerous new electronic genres incorporating sampling and live instrumentation that are represented on the album. According to John Bush of AllMusic, Give 'Em Enough Dope Volume One is an acid jazz and trip hop compilation of music by European artists that incorporates elements from other genres such as funk, soul, jazz and rap. The album's liner notes describe the music: "'Jazz not jazz', 'soul not soul', 'hip not hop', call it what you won't, the atoms keep splitting and new genres are created almost every year. The combination of live playing and sampling has opened up another preverbial can of worms." In his book Drum 'n' Bass: The Rough Guide, writer Peter Shapiro also felt that the album incorporates downtempo music.

Jones compiled and co-ordinated the album alone, and in an interview with M Magazine, he described Give 'Em Enough Dope Volume One as "a reaction against the diluted dance music that had started happening. You weren’t allowed to say you loved Kraftwerk, hip hop or Steely Dan. Everything was kept separate." Fittingly, despite being categorised as a trip-hop and acid jazz compilation, the album is eclectic; Jones described the music as combining "the deep dub superfreaked sound of Howie B," "the mystical D.O.P.E. of Austria's Kruder and Dorfmeister," "the smokin' jazz jam of the Ballistic Brothers" and "the boomin' bass, breaks and beats of Mekon."

== Release and reception ==
Professional ratings
Review scores
Source	Rating
AllMusic	4/5 stars

Give 'Em Enough Dope Volume One was released on 30 June 1994 in the United Kingdom by Wall of Sound, and was the label's first release. In the United States, C & S Records released the album in 1995 as a spin-off to their compilation series Street Jazz, which had begun the previous year. The compilation was mastered by "Paul at Porky's" and its sleeve was designed by Dave Grimshaw and Jeff Logan.

The album was released to critical acclaim. John Bush of AllMusic rated the album four stars out of five and said that, despite containing a variety of styles, "the disparate genres flow well and the sounds are very fresh, making this a great compilation of '90s fusion." Jones felt the album was critically acclaimed "because they're weren't really that many alternative compilations out back then." The success of the album brought Wall of Sound into "that alternative scene," although Jones later recalled that, while other electronic labels on the scene like Mo' Wax, Warp and Ninja Tune "were all doing their thing," Jones "wanted to bring melody" and achieve commercial success.

In the Encyclopedia of Contemporary British Culture, Peter Childs noted that the roots of big beat music, which became popular in the late 1990s, could be traced back to Give 'Em Enough Dope Volume One, as well as to the Beastie Boys' album Paul's Boutique (1989). Jones later spoke with Richard Dorfmeister regarding the song "High Noon" on the former's radio show. Two sequels to the album were released, Give 'Em Enough Dope Volume Two (1995) and Give 'Em Enough Dope Volume Three (1996), both of which were even more popular and successful than the original album, with Robert Christgau naming the second edition the sixth best compilation of 1995.

== Track listing ==
1. The Ballistic Brothers Vs.The Eccentric Afro's – "Blacker" (Sweet Green Jam) (remix by Marden Hill) – 4:43
2. Ski – "(Ain't Gonna) Justify" (Short Trip To Space Mix) (remix by Ashley Beedle) – 9:12
3. Deep Freeze Productions – "Sleeper" – 3:15
4. Children of Judah – "To The Bone (Let's Get Stoned)" – 6:12
5. The Wiseguys – "The Real Vibes" – 9:42
6. Marden Hill – "Get Some In" – 6:09
7. Howie B. – "Breathe In" – 5:31
8. Soft Sugar Productions" – Cubop" – 7:06
9. Kruder & Dorfmeister – "High Noon" – 6:22
10. Mekon – "Phatty's Lunchbox" (Sureshit Mix) – 5:53
11. F.R.I.S.K. – "Take The Sun Away" (Multiplicity Mix) – 6:01

== Personnel ==
- Mark Jones – compiler, co-ordinator
- Paul – mastering
- Jeff Logan – sleeve design
- Dave Grimshaw – sleeve design
