= Don't Be Afraid of Love =

2002 album by Lo Fidelity Allstars

Studio album by Lo Fidelity Allstars
- Released: 5 March 2002
- Studio: The Brain Farm II
- Genre: Big beat
- Length: 67:34
- Label: Skint Records
- Producer: Lo Fidelity Allstars

Lo Fidelity Allstars chronology
On the Floor at the Boutique – Volume 2 (2000)	Don't Be Afraid of Love (2002)	Abstract Funk Theory (2003)

Singles from Don't Be Afraid of Love
- 1. "Lo Fi's in Ibiza" Released: 2001; 2. "Sleeping Faster" Released: 2002; 3. "Feel What I Feel" Released: 2002

Professional ratings
Aggregate scores
Source	Rating
Metacritic	72/100
Review scores
Source	Rating
AllMusic	4.5/5 stars
Exclaim!	unfavorable
NME	mixed
Rolling Stone	favorable
Rolling Stone Album Guide	3/5 stars
Slant Magazine	3.5/5 stars
Stylus Magazine	favorable

Don't Be Afraid of Love is the second studio album by Lo Fidelity Allstars, originally released on Skint Records in 2002. It features guest appearances from Jamie Lidell, Greg Dulli, and Bootsy Collins.

The first single, Lo Fi's In Ibiza entered the Australian chart on 25th of March 2002, peaking at #79.

== Track listing ==
No.	Title	Length
1.	"What You Want"	4:23
2.	"Deep Ellum... Hold On" (featuring Jamie Lidell)	3:57
3.	"Lo Fi's in Ibiza" (featuring Lisa Millett)	5:42
4.	"Somebody Needs You" (featuring Greg Dulli)	4:05
5.	"Don't Be Afraid of Love"	6:50
6.	"Feel What I Feel" (featuring Phillipa Alexander)	4:17
7.	"On the Pier" (featuring Bootsy Collins)	6:48
8.	"Just Enough"	4:31
9.	"Cattleprod"	3:42
10.	"Tied to the Mast"	5:18
11.	"Sleeping Faster"	7:28
12.	"Dark Is Easy / Left to Listen"	10:33

== Personnel ==
Credits adapted from liner notes.

- Lo Fidelity Allstars (Andy Dickinson, Johnny Machin, Dale Maloney, Phil Ward, Martin Whiteman) – production
- Phil Ward – vocals
- Martin Whiteman – vocals
- Jamie Lidell – vocals
- Lisa Millett – vocals
- Andy Dickinson – vocals
- Sanj Sen – production
- Damian Harris – production
- Greg Dulli – vocals, guitar
- Des Davies – guitar
- The Bongtronic Radio Orchestra and Chorus – noises, shouts
- Bootsy Collins – vocals
- Jonathan Enright – trombone
- Mick Ball – trumpet
- DJ Hyste – turntables
- Sen Phillips – feedback

== Charts ==
Chart	Peak position
UK Albums (OCC)	85
