= Frequency Jams =

Studio album by Req
- Released: 23 February 1998
- Recorded: 1997
- Studio: Home studio
- Genres: Electronic; avant-garde; lo-fi; noise; drone; trip hop; experimental
- Length: 48:29
- Label: Skint Records
- Producer: Req

Req chronology
One (1997)	Frequency Jams (1998)	Car Paint Scheme (2000)

Frequency Jams is the second studio album by English experimental electronic producer Req, released in 1998 on Skint Records. As with his debut album, One, Frequency Jams was recorded on a lo-fi 4-track recorder and featuries abstract arrangements that incorporate esoteric, fractured beats, while also introducing new, eclectic influences such as jazz-funk and avant-rock into Req's music. Some felt the album pushed Req closer to the avant-garde, with stronger usage of noise. The album has received critical acclaim for its bleak, dark tone and atypical production. It was named the year's 47th best album by The Wire.

== Background and recording ==
After having spent many years performing as a DJ, Brighton-based producer and graffiti artist Ian Cassar (Req) began making his own music in the mid-1990s and signed to local big beat label Skint Records in 1995, who released all of his material in the 1990s. After several acclaimed EPs, including the Req's Garden E.P. (1995), he released his debut studio album One (1997) on the label to critical acclaim; intending the album to "hint at a direction without ever actually settling down into one," the album was an assortment of abstract and ambient, downtempo and frequently beat-based music."

Req began work on his second studio album Frequency Jams later on in 1997, and as with One, he made the album in his home using a Tascam 644 4-track recorder, delivering the album a lo-fi feel. The album was taped in 1997, but unlike his first album, the liner notes for Frequency Jams do not specify the recording period.

== Music ==
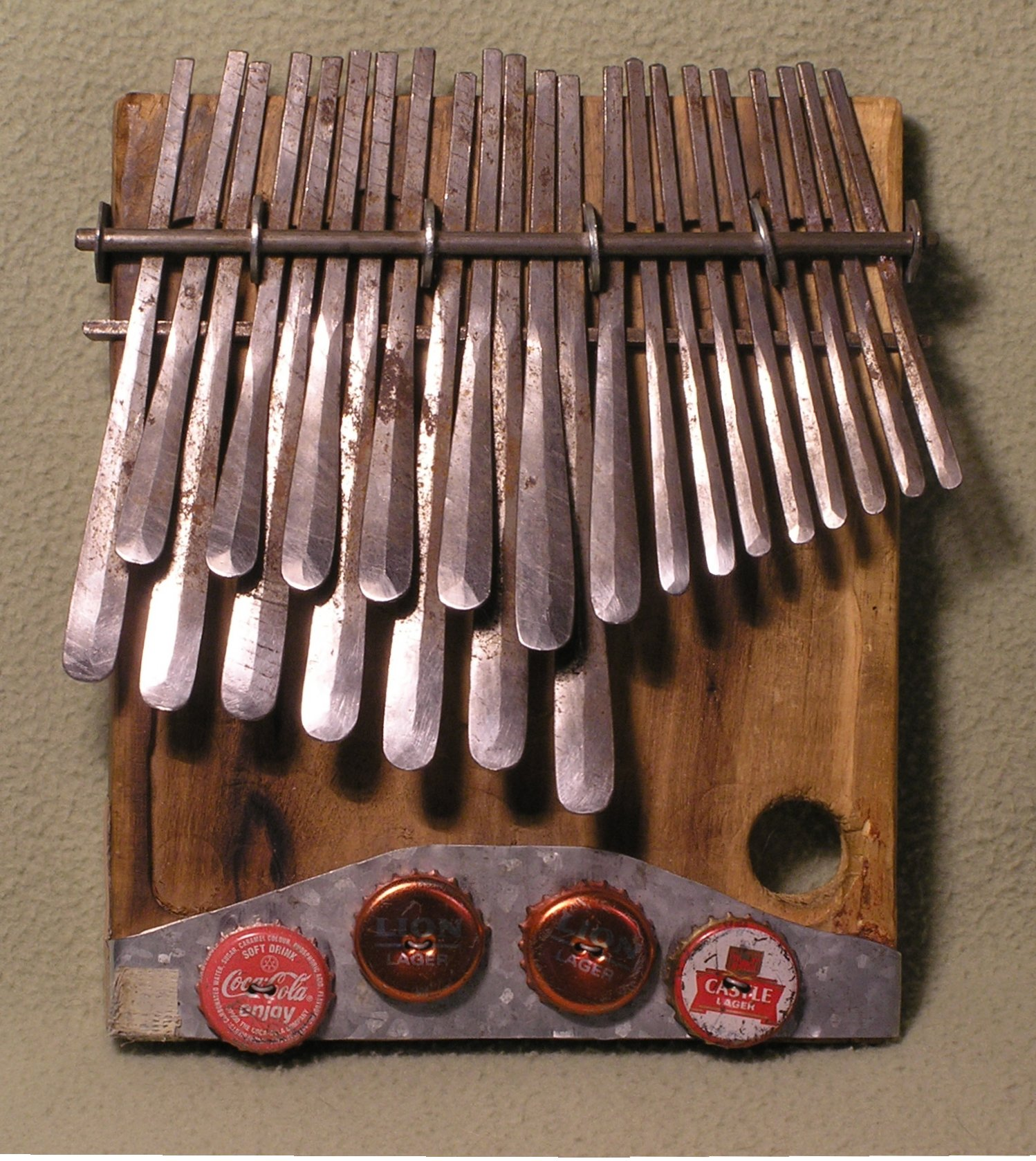
"Mbira Classic" is a tribute to the African thumb piano, the Mbira.

As with One, Frequency Jam has been described as "a blurry, choppy assemblage of fractured rhythms and lo-fi Tascam experimentalism." Reviewer Sean Cooper of AllMusic noted an increased hip hop influence, saying he drags "a for-all-intents purist's hip-hop into some of the most interesting, inventive corners of instrumental beats." Similarly, Angela Lewis of The Independent reckoned "an esoteric brew of hip-hop and electronic noise," although noting that, as "tunes" rarely stand in the way of the record's "cut-and-past experimentalism," the album was closer to avant-garde music. Neil Kulkarni of Spin described the music as "strung out on dread, often arrhythmic and always stubbornly undanceable", and felt that, despite being released on Skint, the album was "the frigid flipsie of Skint's post-trip-hop irreverence," and noted that it established him as the label's "party-down wallflower."

Opening track "World" and the fourth track "Crack" are said to "fizz on icy waters of trebly noise," with the beats only "finding their flow" after the appearance of stop-start crossfades. "I" and "Bizames" display a "grisly" jazz-funk sound on top of spectral drones which Kulkarni felt were "more akin to avant-rock than hip hop." "Mbira Classic" is a "haunting, fuzzy" and "lonseome" tribute to the Mbira, a traditional African thumb piano. The piece, alongside the later track "Vocoder Break Rock", have been compared to electro innovators Man Parrish and their "brittle flux." The beat absconds altogether on "Navigator 1 & 2", instead leaving "a warped-out rumble of harsh bass" that Kulkarni felt was "worthy of hardcore dancehall ragga." The album closes with a remix of "I" subtitled the "Linn Mix", which features "heavy-on-the-attack old school rhythms."

== Release and reception ==
Professional ratings
Review scores
Source	Rating
AllMusic	4/5 stars
The Independent	(favourable)
Spin	8/10

Frequency Jams was released on 23 February 1998 by Skint Records, a day short of an exact year after One. As with One, fellow producer Simon Thornton mastered the album. Although "Navigator 1" and "Navigator 2" are sequenced together onto the same track, the track listing on the album cover presents them as separate tracks. The album was popular with fans and has proven influential; in an interview with The Quietus, techno producer Lee Gamble cited both One and Frequency Jams among his "favorite records", calling them "timeless [records]" and noting their influence in his own work.

As with One, Frequency Jams was also greeted to a positive reception from music critics. Rating the album four out of five stars and naming it an "Album Pick", Sean Cooper of AllMusic said that Req "more than makes up in concept what he lacks in craft," and highlighted "Mbira Classic" and "I (Linn Mix)" as among the album's best tracks. Neil Kulkarni of Spin rated the album eight out of ten stars, calling it "a bleak alternative to big beat's bumptious cheer", and saying that the record "is a timely reminder that hip-hop techniques still lend themselves to extreme noise terror." Angela Lewis of The Independent said that "[Req's] warped playfulness makes this an intriguing find, but this is one for the avant-garde palate, for sure." The Wire ranked it at number 47 on their list of the 50 best albums of 1998.

== Track listing ==
All tracks are written by Req.

No.	Title	Length
1.	"World"	6:51
2.	"What"	5:24
3.	"I"	5:02
4.	"Crack"	5:15
5.	"Mbira Classic"	3:09
6.	"Navigator 1 & 2"	7:08
7.	"Bizames"	4:57
8.	"Vocoder Break Rock"	4:32
9.	"I (Linn Mix)"	6:04

== Personnel ==
Credits adapted from liner notes.

- Req – music
- Simon Thornton – mastering
