= Melody A.M. =

2001 studio album by Röyksopp

Studio album by Röyksopp
- Released: 13 September 2001
- Genre: Downtempo; trip hop; chill-out; house; ambient; techno
- Length: 45:58
- Label: Wall of Sound
- Producer: Röyksopp

Röyksopp chronology
Melody A.M. (2001)	The Understanding (2005)

Singles from Melody A.M.
- 1. "So Easy" Released: 1999; 2. "Eple" Released: 23 July 2001; 3. "Poor Leno" Released: 3 December 2001; 4. "Remind Me" Released: 1 July 2002; 5. "Sparks" Released: 23 June 2003

Melody A.M. is the debut studio album by Norwegian electronic music duo Röyksopp, released on 13 September 2001 by Wall of Sound. The album reached number one in the Norwegian Albums chart. In the UK, it reached number nine in the country's Album chart, and topped both the Dance Albums and the Independent Albums charts. As of 2005, the album had sold 750,000 copies worldwide, with 454,271 sold in the United Kingdom alone.

== Composition ==
Jon Setzen of the San Francisco Chronicle describes the album as "an across-the-board mix of bleepy synths, crunch beats and ambient, dreamy vocals, with even a bit disco mixed in at times". With the album, "Röyksopp balances the haunted atmospheres of Boards of Canada with the more traditional "songwriting" sensibility of downbeat specialists like Groove Armada or Koop", according to John Bush of AllMusic. Andy Gill of The Independent said that Melody A.M. exemplifies the band's intention to combine "Satie-esque harmonies and melodies like those of Francis Lai with the best aspects of three decades of electronic dance music: that Seventies analogue warmth, those fat Eighties beats and that meticulous Nineties programming." Nick DeCicco of Daily Republic also compared the record to the works of Air, Massive Attack, Tricky, Portishead and Moby. The album features vocals by Anneli Drecker and Erlend Øye.

The first track "So Easy", described as "eerie", samples the refrain from Bobby Vinton's "Blue on Blue", said to be "recorded by some long-forgotten vocal chorus" and has "a chunky bassline" underneath. The second track "Eple", has "a high-pitched sonic tickle that falls in and out of pitch", and "is pushed through with acoustic guitar and sluggish drums" The "slow R&B" track "Sparks", said to be a "toned-down" Portishead", has "Drecker's vocals drift and hang over the lush bass lines and airy guitar riffs." The "gentle drum and bass" track "In Space" has "rippling harps over sighing, sampled strings" "Poor Leno" is a house song where Øye sings "a lullaby hook over a rich, subtly mutating" groove.

"A Higher Place" is a downtempo track with "phosphorescent synth chords and a stinging guitar loop". The next track "Royksopp's Night Out" is described as "tense, cinematic funk", where the band "allow themselves to break into a free-flowing and slightly less restrained darkness." "Remind Me" is a club track influenced by acid house and explores easy listening music with "playground keyboard refrains and 60s vocal melody". It also has "squiggly bass lines, melancholic synth effects, and dreamy male vocals." The next track "She's So", a track with "mournful saxophone and arcing synths to recall the dated tones of Tangerine Dream", "places the swooning moogs and strings of Air" with an "otherworldliness" texture "reminiscent of Vangelis' soundtrack to Blade Runner." The album closes with "40 Years Back/Come", a track with an "'80s sense of artificial ethereality" and "spindly, etiolated synth lines around rasping, squelchy beats before closing with warm fretless bass."

== Critical reception ==
Professional ratings
Aggregate scores
Source	Rating
Metacritic	81/100
Review scores
Source	Rating
AllMusic	5/5 stars
Blender	4/5 stars
Entertainment Weekly	B
The Guardian	4/5 stars
Muzik	5/5
NME	8/10
Pitchfork	7.8/10
Q	4/5 stars
Rolling Stone	3/5 stars
San Francisco Chronicle	5/5 stars

Melody A.M. was met with universal acclaim from music critics. At Metacritic, which assigns a normalised rating out of 100 to reviews from mainstream publications, the album received an average score of 81, based on 21 reviews.

Andy Battaglia of The A.V. Club called the album "a highly imaginative entry into the saturated realm of downtempo chill-out music." Writing for Launch, Ken Micallef wrote that "Röyksopp spins ambient trip hop into bedazzled and beautiful winter Muzak." Ethan Brown remarked that the album "will at least remind some of its eccentric possibilities. Like Björk's Vespertine or bedroom auteurs like Luke Vibert, Melody A.M. wires us into a highly personal, almost cocoonlike sonic sensibility." The album "settles into a stream of pastoral, boutique techno that’s both soothing and derivative", according to David Browne of Entertainment Weekly.

Abebe Nitsuh of Pitchfork considered Melody A.M. to be "the most solid, confident, and generally pleasurable downtempo full-length you'll be hearing for a while. Whether that means it's a must-buy, more well-meaning nondescript bubbling, or end-of-the-world car-commercial music has to be left to you." However, he said that the worst moments of the album is when the duo "go generically downtempo and then miss the mark". DeCicco found the album unoriginal, continuing that "there isn’t much here that wasn’t done better and more interestingly at the height of downtempo’s popularity than it was by Röyksopp’s contemporaries."

On 21 November 2007, the album was included on The Guardian's series of the 1000 Albums to Hear Before You Die. It is also listed in a similar selection, called 1001 Albums You Must Hear Before You Die, in a series of books by Quintessence Editions. On 24 November 2009, Melody A.M. was named the best Norwegian album of the 2000s decade by the Norwegian newspaper Verdens Gang.

== Track listing ==
No.	Title	Writer(s)	Length
1.	"So Easy"	Röyksopp; Burt Bacharach; Hal David	3:44
2.	"Eple" (some versions contain a "hidden track" of talking in the pregap)	Röyksopp	3:36
3.	"Sparks"	Röyksopp; Anneli Drecker	5:23
4.	"In Space"	Röyksopp	3:30
5.	"Poor Leno"	Röyksopp; Erlend Øye	3:57
6.	"A Higher Place"	Röyksopp	4:31
7.	"Röyksopp's Night Out"	Röyksopp	7:30
8.	"Remind Me"	Röyksopp; Øye	3:39
9.	"She's So"	Röyksopp; Peter Thomas	5:23
10.	"40 Years Back\Come"	Röyksopp; Michael Manring	4:45

European limited edition bonus disc
No.	Title	Writer(s)	Length
1.	"Poor Leno" (Jakatta Radio Mix)	Röyksopp; Øye	3:51
2.	"Poor Leno" (Silicone Soul's Hypno House Dub)	Röyksopp; Øye	8:09
3.	"Remind Me" (Someone Else's Radio Remix)	Röyksopp; Øye	4:03
4.	"Eple" (video)		3:38
5.	"Poor Leno" (video)		3:57
6.	"Remind Me" (video)		4:05

US special edition bonus disc
No.	Title	Writer(s)	Length
1.	"Remind Me" (Someone Else's Mix)	Röyksopp; Øye	3:36
2.	"Poor Leno" (Röyksopp's Istanbul Forever Take)	Röyksopp; Øye	5:35
3.	"Remind Me" (Ernest St. Laurent Moonfish Mix)	Röyksopp; Øye	6:56
4.	"Poor Leno" (Silicone Soul's Hypno House Dub)	Röyksopp; Øye	8:09
5.	"Poor Leno" (video)		3:57
6.	"Remind Me" (video)		4:05
7.	"Eple" (video)		3:38

Japanese special edition bonus disc
No.	Title	Writer(s)	Length
1.	"Don't Go"	Röyksopp	7:19
2.	"Poor Leno" (Jakatta Radio Mix)	Röyksopp; Øye	3:35
3.	"Poor Leno" (Silicone Soul's Hypno House Dub)	Röyksopp; Øye	8:11
4.	"Remind Me" (Someone Else's Radio Remix)	Röyksopp; Øye	4:04
5.	"Eple" (Fatboy Slim Remix)	Röyksopp	5:48
6.	"Eple" (Shakedown Remix)	Röyksopp	6:43
7.	"Eple" (Black Strobe Remix)	Röyksopp	6:10
8.	"Sparks" (Roni Size Remix)	Röyksopp; Drecker	5:29
9.	"Sparks" (Murk Downtown Miami Mix)	Röyksopp; Drecker	8:22
10.	"Poor Leno" (video)		4:01
11.	"Remind Me" (video)		4:12
12.	"Eple" (video)		3:39

Sample credits

- "So Easy" contains a sample from "Blue on Blue" by Gals and Pals.
- "A Higher Place" contains a sample from "Freedom" by the Tyrrel Corporation.
- "She's So" contains a sample from "Love in Space" by Peter Thomas Sound Orchestra.
- "40 Years Back\Come" contains a sample from "Red Right Returning" by Michael Manring.

== Personnel ==
Credits adapted from the liner notes of Melody A.M.

- Röyksopp – arrangement, production
- Anneli Drecker – vocals on "Sparks"
- Erlend Øye – vocals on "Poor Leno" and "Remind Me"
- Ole J. Mjøs – co-production on "A Higher Place"
- Ole Vegard "05" Skauge – bass on "A Higher Place"
- Rune Lindbæk – extra input on "A Higher Place" and "40 Years Back\Come"
- Marte Rognerud – inner sleeve photography
- Sølve Sundsbø – cover photography
- Tom Hingston Studio – design

== Charts ==
=== Weekly charts ===
Weekly chart performance for Melody A.M.
Chart (2001–2003)	Peak position
Australian Alternative Albums (ARIA)	21
Belgian Alternative Albums (Ultratop Flanders)	26
Dutch Albums (Album Top 100)	69
European Albums (Music & Media)	36
French Albums (SNEP)	84
Irish Albums (IRMA)	18
Japanese Albums (Oricon)	211
Norwegian Albums (VG-lista)	1
Scottish Albums (OCC)	10
Swedish Albums (Sverigetopplistan)	50
UK Albums (OCC)	9
UK Dance Albums (OCC)	1
UK Independent Albums (OCC)	1
US Top Dance Albums (Billboard)	18

=== Year-end charts ===
2002 year-end chart performance for Melody A.M.
Chart (2002)	Position
UK Albums (OCC)	91

2003 year-end chart performance for Melody A.M.
Chart (2003)	Position
UK Albums (OCC)	74

== Certifications and sales ==
Certifications and sales for Melody A.M.
Region	Certification	Certified units/sales
France	—	40,000
Italy	—	10,000
Netherlands (NVPI)	Platinum	80,000^{^}
Norway (IFPI Norway)	Platinum	50,000^{*}
Sweden	—	17,000
United Kingdom (BPI)	Platinum	454,271
^{*} Sales figures based on certification alone.^{^} Shipments figures based on certification alone.

== Release history ==
Release history for Melody A.M.
Region	Date	Edition	Label	Ref(s)
Germany	13 September 2001	Standard	Parlophone	
Italy	14 September 2001	Standard	EMI	
United Kingdom	8 October 2001	Standard	Wall of Sound	
France	9 October 2001	Standard	Labels	
Australia	4 March 2002	Standard	EMI	
Japan	5 June 2002	Standard	EMI	
United Kingdom	12 August 2002	Reissue	Wall of Sound	
United States	15 October 2002	Standard; special	Astralwerks	
Japan	18 June 2003	Special	EMI	
