= Battle Flag (song) =

Single by Lo Fidelity Allstars featuring Pigeonhed

from the album How to Operate with a Blown Mind
- Released: November 16, 1998; February 12, 1999 (US 12"); May 2, 2000 (Import re-release)
- Recorded: 1997
- Length: 5:57 (original Pigeonhed version); 5:39 (Lo Fidelity Allstars remix); 4:00 (single edit)
- Label: Skint, Columbia
- Songwriter: Pigeonhed
- Producer: Lo Fidelity Allstars

Lo Fidelity Allstars featuring Pigeonhed singles chronology
"Vision Incision" (1998)	"Battle Flag" (1998)	"Blisters on My Brain" (1998)

Alternative covers
- U.K. single #2

Alternative cover
- U.S. CD single

Music video
- "Battle Flag" on YouTube

"Battle Flag" (or "Battleflag") is a 1997 song by American funk rock band Pigeonhed which appeared on their 1997 album The Full Sentence. In 1998, the song was remixed by the British big beat group Lo Fidelity Allstars for the Pigeonhed remix album Flash Bulb Emergency Overflow Cavalcade of Remixes.

The "Battleflag" remix, credited to "Lo Fidelity Allstars (featuring Pigeonhed)" was issued as a single in November 1998 and appeared on Lo Fidelity Allstars' album How to Operate with a Blown Mind. Although the song was a minor hit in the United Kingdom, reaching No. 36 on the UK Singles Chart, it was a major hit on American alternative rock radio and reached No. 6 on the Billboard Modern Rock Tracks chart.

== Media appearances ==
The song has been featured in series such as Black Bird, ER, Queer as Folk, Smallville, Person of Interest, and The Sopranos. It has also appeared in the films Running with the Devil, Coyote Ugly, Forces of Nature, Mean Machine, and Very Bad Things, as well as the trailers for films such as Charlie's Angels, The 51st State, Drillbit Taylor, Starsky & Hutch, and Play It to the Bone. It was also used in trailers for the video game Duke Nukem Forever and WWE promotional videos.

== Track listing ==
=== 1998 UK single #1 ===
1. "Battleflag (Full Version)"
2. "Pony Pressure"
3. "Battleflag (Bonus Beats)"

=== 1998 UK single #2 ===
1. "Battleflag (Radio Edit)"
2. "Battleflag (Space Raiders)"
3. "Battleflag (Live At The Big Beat Boutique)"

=== 1998 US CD single ===
1. "Battle Flag [Radio Version]" – 3:54
2. "Battle Flag (Callout Hook #1)" – 0:10
3. "Battle Flag (Callout Hook #2)" – 0:05

=== 1999 US 12" ===
1. "Battle Flag" – 5:29
2. "Blisters on My Brain" – 7:09
3. "Pony Pressure" – 4:48
4. "Vision Incision" – 5:24
