= On the Floor at the Boutique =

Live album by Fatboy Slim
- Released: 1998
- Recorded: 1997
- Genre: Big beat, funk, hip hop, acid house
- Length: 66:54
- Label: Skint
- Producer: Fatboy Slim

Fatboy Slim chronology
Beat Up the NME (1997)	On the Floor at the Boutique (1998)	You've Come a Long Way, Baby (1998)

Professional ratings
Review scores
Source	Rating
AllMusic	4/5 stars
Pitchfork	7.3/10
Q	4/5 stars
Robert Christgau	A−
Rolling Stone	3.5/5 stars
Tom Hull – on the Web	B+

On the Floor at the Boutique is a live album mixed by British big beat musician Fatboy Slim. It was recorded in 1997 at the Big Beat Boutique in Brighton, and released in 1998.

== Track listing ==
No.	Title	Writer(s)	Artist	Length
1.	"Apache"	Jerry Lordan	Michael Viner's Incredible Bongo Band	2:46
2.	"Discositdown"	George Clinton, Michael Clark, Eddie Hazel	Fred Wesley & The Horny Horns	3:34
3.	"Deaf Mick's Throwdown"	Mex (Ian Thompson)	Clockwork Voodoo Freaks	2:04
4.	"Because I Got It Like That (Ultimatum Mix)"	Nathaniel "Afrika Baby Bam" Hall, Michael "Mike Gee" Small	Jungle Brothers	3:10
5.	"Vol 1 Side 2 Track 2"	Bassbin Twins	Bassbin Twins	2:31
6.	"That Green Jesus"	Aaron Gilbert	Mr. Natural	4:31
7.	"The World's Made Up of This & That (Fatboy Slim Mix)"	D.P. Thoughts (Rob Cairns)	Deeds Plus Thoughts	3:29
8.	"Michael Jackson"	Fatboy Slim	Fatboy Slim	4:38
9.	"Phun-Ky"	Thomas R. Gerlach	DJ Tonka	4:45
10.	"Forget It"	Andy Gardner, Matt Cantor	Cut & Paste	3:05
11.	"Everybody in the House"	Mike & Charlie (Mike Nice & Charlie Londono), Tony Faline	Buzzthrill	3:01
12.	"Can You Feel It?"	Darren Robinson, Zahid Tariq, Todd Terry, Daneel	C.L.S.	4:03
13.	"Acid Enlightenment"	Mark Bell, Birchell, Aldo Bender	Aldo Bender	2:27
14.	"I'm a Disco Dancer"	Christopher Just	Christopher Just	2:29
15.	"Psychopath"	Hardknox	Hardknox	4:14
16.	"Break In"	Aaron Carter, Stephen James Barry	Cirrus	3:28
17.	"Give Me My Auger Back"	Psychedeliasmith	Psychedeliasmith	4:21
18.	"Post Punk Progression"	Lee Potter	Cut La Roc	2:20
19.	"The Rockafeller Skank"	Fatboy Slim	Fatboy Slim	6:05

== See also ==
- On the Floor at the Boutique – Volume 2
- On the Floor at the Boutique – Volume 3
