= The Understanding (Röyksopp album) =

Studio album by Röyksopp
- Released: 22 June 2005
- Genres: Electronica; techno; Europop; electropop
- Length: 58:40
- Label: Wall of Sound
- Producer: Röyksopp

Röyksopp chronology
Melody A.M. (2001)	The Understanding (2005)	Röyksopp's Night Out (2006)

Singles from The Understanding
- 1. "Only This Moment" Released: 27 June 2005; 2. "49 Percent" Released: 26 September 2005; 3. "What Else Is There?" Released: 5 December 2005; 4. "Beautiful Day Without You" Released: 26 June 2006

Professional ratings
Aggregate scores
Source	Rating
Metacritic	68/100
Review scores
Source	Rating
AllMusic	3/5 stars
Entertainment Weekly	B
The Guardian	4/5 stars
The Irish Times	4/5 stars
NME	8/10
Pitchfork	8.1/10
Q	4/5 stars
Rolling Stone	3/5 stars
Spin	B+
The Village Voice	C+

The Understanding is the second studio album by Norwegian electronic music duo Röyksopp. It was released on 22 June 2005 by Wall of Sound. The Understanding debuted at number 13 on the UK Albums Chart, with 22,466 copies sold in its first week. The album was certified gold by the British Phonographic Industry (BPI) on 1 December 2006, and had sold 103,500 copies in the United Kingdom by March 2009.

== In popular culture ==
Similarly to Melody A.M., songs from The Understanding were used widely in television adverts and video games. "Circuit Breaker" and "Only This Moment" were used in an episode of Danmarks Radio's consumer programme, named Rabatten. "Follow My Ruin" was also included on the soundtrack to FIFA 06. "What Else Is There?" was used in an O_{2} television advertisement in the Czech Republic in 2007 and in Slovakia in 2008. It was also used in the films Cashback (2006) and Meet Bill (2007). A remixed version of "What Else Is There?" was featured on the 15 April 2007 episode of the HBO series Entourage. "Triumphant" would sometimes be heard in the British series of The X Factor.

== Track listing ==
All tracks are written by Röyksopp, except where noted.

No.	Title	Length
1.	"Triumphant"	4:20
2.	"Only This Moment" (writers: Röyksopp, Kate Havnevik)	3:55
3.	"49 Percent" (writers: Röyksopp, Chelonis R. Jones)	5:11
4.	"Sombre Detune"	4:52
5.	"Follow My Ruin"	3:51
6.	"Beautiful Day Without You"	5:29
7.	"What Else Is There?" (writers: Röyksopp, Karin Dreijer)	5:17
8.	"Circuit Breaker"	5:24
9.	"Alpha Male"	8:11
10.	"Someone Like Me"	5:23
11.	"Dead to the World"	5:20
12.	"Tristesse Globale"	1:24

Japanese edition bonus track
No.	Title	Length
13.	"Curves"	5:07

Limited edition bonus disc
No.	Title	Length
1.	"Go Away" (writers: Röyksopp, Jones)	3:52
2.	"Clean Sweep"	5:17
3.	"Boys"	4:45
4.	"Head"	5:03
5.	"Looser Now"	6:04

Japan deluxe edition bonus disc
No.	Title	Length
1.	"Only This Moment" (Röyksopp's Forsiktige Massasje)	4:58
2.	"Go Away"	3:52
3.	"Clean Sweep"	5:17
4.	"Boys"	4:45
5.	"Head"	5:03
6.	"Looser Now"	6:04
7.	"Only This Moment" (Alan Braxe & Fred Falke remix)	6:35
8.	"49 Percent" (Angello & Ingrosso remix)	9:19

Sample credits

- "What Else Is There?" contains a sample from "Love Me, Love the Life I Lead" by The Drifters and "Kill Me with Your Love" by Jericho.
- "Dead to the World" contains a sample from "Who We Are" by Camel.

== Personnel ==
Credits adapted from the liner notes of The Understanding.

- Röyksopp – performance, arrangement, mixing, production
- Chelonis R. Jones – vocals (track 3 and "Go Away")
- Karin Dreijer – vocals (track 7)
- Olof Dreijer – vocal recording (track 7)
- Kate Havnevik – additional vocals, creative input (tracks 2, 8)
- Tom Elmhirst – co-mixing (track 2)
- Kato Ådland – bass on "Triumphant"
- Ib Kleiser – guitar (track 2)
- Sanghon Kim – artwork
- Camille Vivier – photos

== Charts ==
Chart (2005–07)	Peak position
Australian Albums (ARIA)	98
Australian Dance Albums (ARIA)	11
Austrian Albums (Ö3 Austria)	60
Belgian Albums (Ultratop Flanders)	23
Belgian Albums (Ultratop Wallonia)	33
Danish Albums (Hitlisten)	36
Dutch Albums (Album Top 100)	48
European Albums (Billboard)	31
Finnish Albums (Suomen virallinen lista)	39
French Albums (SNEP)	45
German Albums (Offizielle Top 100)	41
Greek Albums (IFPI)	23
Irish Albums (IRMA)	16
Italian Albums (FIMI)	21
Japanese Albums (Oricon)	83
Norwegian Albums (VG-lista)	1
Swedish Albums (Sverigetopplistan)	7
Swiss Albums (Schweizer Hitparade)	18
UK Albums (Official Charts)	13
UK Dance Albums (Official Charts)	1
UK Independent Albums (Official Charts)	1
US Heatseekers Albums (Billboard)	22
US Independent Albums (Billboard)	32
US Top Dance Albums (Billboard)	2

== Certifications ==
Region	Certification	Certified units/sales
United Kingdom (BPI)	Gold	103,500

== Release history ==
Region	Date	Label	Ref.
Japan	22 June 2005	EMI	
Germany	24 June 2005	Parlophone	
Italy	24 June 2005	EMI	
France	28 June 2005	Labels	
Norway	29 June 2005	Virgin	
United Kingdom	4 July 2005	Wall of Sound	
United States	12 July 2005	Astralwerks	
Australia	15 July 2005	EMI	
