= Battle Flag =

Battle Flag may refer to:

- War flag or battle flag, a flag typically used by sovereign territories and flown by military forces
- Confederate Battle Flag, of the Confederate States of America
- "Battle Flag" (song), by Pigeonhed, 1997; remixed and recorded by Lo Fidelity Allstars and Pigeonhed, 1998
- Battle Flag, a book in The Starbuck Chronicles series by Bernard Cornwell

== See also ==
- Battle ensign, a war flag to be used when a ship enters combat
- Battle honour, in British and other European military traditions
- Campaign streamer, a decoration attached to a military unit flag to recognize an achievement
