= Poor Leno =

Single by Röyksopp

from the album Melody A.M.
- Released: 3 December 2001
- Recorded: 2001
- Genre: Electronica; progressive house
- Length: 4:01
- Label: Wall of Sound; Astralwerks
- Songwriters: Svein Berge; Torbjørn Brundtland; Erlend Øye

Röyksopp singles chronology
"Eple" (2001)	"Poor Leno" (2001)	"Remind Me" (2002)

"Poor Leno" is the third single from the Norwegian duo Röyksopp. It was released in December 2001 as the second single from the band's debut album Melody A.M.. The vocals are sung by Erlend Øye. It is used in the sixth-generation video game SSX 3 as well as in The Drop, a short film displayed on the canopy at the Fremont Street Experience in Las Vegas, Nevada.

== Track listing ==
=== Original release ===
UK 12" 1 WALLT073

1. "Poor Leno" (Sander Kleinenberg's Northern Beach Mix) – 10:19
2. "Poor Leno" (Röyksopp's Istanbul Forever Take) – 5:53
3. "Poor Leno" (album version) – 3:57

UK CD 1 WALLD073

1. "Poor Leno" (Edit) – 3:31
2. "Poor Leno" (Sander Kleinenberg's Northern Beach Mix) – 10:19
3. "Poor Leno" (Röyksopp's Istanbul Forever Take) – 5:37

=== Re-release ===
UK CD 2 WALLD079

1. "Poor Leno" (Edit) – 3:31
2. "Poor Leno" (Jakatta Mix) – 7:36
3. "Poor Leno" (Röyksopp's Istanbul Forever Take) – 5:34

UK CD 3 WALLD079V

1. "Poor Leno" (Edit) – 3:31
2. "Poor Leno" (Silicone Soul's Hypno House Dub) – 8:09
3. "So Easy" (Live at Astoria) – 4:31
4. "Poor Leno" video

UK 12" 2 WALLT079

1. "Poor Leno" (Jakatta Mix) – 7:36
2. "Poor Leno" (album version) – 3:57
3. "Poor Leno" (Silicone Soul's Hypno House Dub) – 8:09

== Popular response ==
The single was released in 2001 as the second single from Röyksopp's debut album Melody A.M. and re-released in 2002. In the UK, the single reached #38 on the UK Singles Chart.

== Music video ==
Directed by Sam Arthur, the music video revolves around a creature resembling a small man or boy in a bear suit, and unveils a story of the creature being tracked and captured from its natural habitat, to end up being caged in a zoo, longing to escape. The video, mainly animated, also features a few clips of live recordings with overlapping animation. Additionally, video footage of snowy mountains were sampled from the film adaptation of The Witches, a book by Roald Dahl. Because the lyrics include the words 'being 9 years old', the bearman in the clip can be taken to be dressed up boy or small man.

== Versions and remixes ==
Several versions and remixes of "Poor Leno" were released:

- Poor Leno (Radio Mix).
- Poor Leno (Silicone Soul's Hypno House Dub).
- Poor Leno (Jakatta Mix).
- Poor Leno (Röyksopp's Istanbul Forever Take).
- Poor Leno (Sander Kleinenberg Northern Beach Mix).
- Poor Leno (Sander Kleinenberg Northern Beach Dub)
- Poor Leno (Lazyboy Remix).
- Poor Leno (Raven's Dub)
- Poor Leno (Freddo Bootleg)
- Poor Leno (Silicone Soul's Hypno House Dub)/ There Is a Light That Never Goes Out (Acapella)
- Poor Leno (Uppermost Remix)
- Poor Leno (Sleep Party People cover)

== Chart positions ==
Year	Chart	Position
2001	UK Singles Chart	59
2002	UK Singles Chart	38
