= Eple =

Single by Röyksopp

from the album Melody A.M.
- Released: 23 July 2001
- Recorded: 2001
- Genre: Electronica; ambient; trip hop
- Length: 3:51
- Label: Wall of Sound; Astralwerks 11352
- Songwriters: Svein Berge; Torbjørn Brundtland

Röyksopp singles chronology
"So Easy" (1999)	"Eple" (2001)	"Poor Leno" (2001)

Audio sample
- file; help

"Eple" (Norwegian pronunciation: [ˈɛ̂plə]; "Apple") is a song by Norwegian electronica duo Röyksopp, released as their second single. In 2003 it was re-released as the duo's third single from their debut album Melody A.M.

== Commercial use ==
The song's title comes from the Norwegian word for apple. The song was licensed by Apple and used as the introduction music for the Mac OS X Panther setup assistant. It was also used as background music for the gaming show Gamezville on Sky One during the opening and on the UK television programme The Kevin Bishop Show, in which a man called Gary in one of its sketches pretends to be a radio announcer, only to the annoyance of his girlfriend.

A small snippet of the song can be heard during the station ID for American public television station KLRU as well as their identical production logo featured at the end of their productions such as Austin City Limits.

The single accompanied a television test card in the UK during 2001.

The song is the background music heard in a video made by Volvo called "Vision 2020", in which it showed off future semi truck concepts.

The now defunct German music channel MTV2 Pop used a section of this song to introduce the commercial breaks. The song is mainly based on a sample from Bob James's song "You're as Right as Rain" on his 1975 album Two, whose cover depicts a golden hand holding an apple.

== Track listings ==
=== 2001 release ===
UK CD WALLD071

1. "Eple" (Edit) – 3:35
2. "Eple" (Bjørn Torske Remix) – 6:52
3. "Röyksopp's Night Out" – 7:30

UK 12" WALLT071

1. "Eple" – 3:52
2. "Eple" (Bjørn Torske Remix) – 6:52
3. "Röyksopp's Night Out" – 8:08

=== 2003 re-release ===
UK CD 1 WALLD080

1. "Eple" (Edit) – 3:35
2. "Eple" (Fatboy Slim Remix) – 3:56
3. "Eple" (Shakedown Remix) – 6:43

UK CD 2 WALLD080V

1. "Eple" (Edit) – 3:35
2. "Eple" (Boris and Michi's Eplistic-Scratch-Attack) – 7:16
3. "Eple" (Black Strobe Remix) – 6:10
4. "Eple" (Video) – 3:35

UK 12" 1 WALLT080

1. "Eple" – 3:52
2. "Eple" (Shakedown Remix) – 6:43
3. "Eple" (Fatboy Slim Remix) – 5:48

UK 12" 2 WALLT080X

1. "Eple" – 3:52
2. "Eple" (Black Strobe Remix) – 6:10
3. "Eple" (Boris and Michi's Eplistic-Scratch-Attack) – 7:16

== Response ==
The single was first released in 2001 and re-released in 2003. In the UK the single managed to reach number 16 on the UK Singles Chart.

== Charts ==
Year	Chart	Position
2001	UK Singles Chart	57
2003	UK Singles Chart	16
