= Req (disambiguation) =

Req or Req. may refer to:

- Required course
- Req (musician) (Ian Cassar; born 1966), English DJ and producer
- Esprit Requien, in botanist author citations (Req.)
