= How to Operate with a Blown Mind =

1998 studio album by Lo Fidelity Allstars

Studio album by Lo Fidelity Allstars
- Released: 25 May 1998
- Studios: The Brain Farm; Chiswick Reach
- Genres: Big beat; dance-punk
- Length: 69:06
- Label: Skint
- Producer: Lo Fidelity Allstars

Lo Fidelity Allstars chronology
| How to Operate with a Blown Mind (1998) | On the Floor at the Boutique (2000) |

Singles from How to Operate with a Blown Mind
- 1. "Kool Roc Bass" Released: 1997; 2. "Vision Incision" Released: 1998; 3. "Battle Flag" Released: 1998

How to Operate with a Blown Mind is the debut studio album by Lo Fidelity Allstars, released on Skint Records in 1998.

== Critical reception ==
Professional ratings
Review scores
| Source | Rating |
|---|---|
| AllMusic | 4/5 stars |
| Entertainment Weekly | B |
| Rolling Stone | 3/5 stars |
| Rolling Stone Album Guide | 2/5 stars |

The Hartford Courant wrote that "there's something a little different about the Allstar approach, alternating the boomy, hooky dance tracks with spacy, equally melodic washes of instrumentals, over which are long, Beat poet-like rants." NME named How to Operate with a Blown Mind the 21st best album of 1998.

In a rundown of "intelligent big beat", Simon Reynolds called the album an "oxymoronic masterpiece of 'darkside big beat'."

== Track listing ==
All tracks are written by Lo Fidelity Allstars, except "Battle Flag" written by Pigeonhed.

| No. | Title | Length |
|---|---|---|
| 1. | "Warming Up the Brain Farm" | 2:55 |
| 2. | "Kool Roc Bass" | 7:40 |
| 3. | "Kasparov's Revenge" | 6:00 |
| 4. | "Blisters on My Brain" | 6:46 |
| 5. | "How to Operate with a Blown Mind" | 7:24 |
| 6. | "I Used to Fall in Love" | 5:10 |
| 7. | "Battle Flag" (featuring Pigeonhed) | 5:39 |
| 8. | "Lazer Sheep Dip Funk" | 7:21 |
| 9. | "Will I Get Out of Jail" | 6:18 |
| 10. | "Vision Incision" | 9:37 |
| 11. | "Nightime Story" | 4:16 |

Japanese edition bonus track
| No. | Title | Length |
|---|---|---|
| 12. | "Taking Fear from Behind" | 6:18 |

== Personnel ==
Credits adapted from liner notes.

- The Wrekked Train – vocals
- The Albino Priest – turntables, sampler
- A One Man Crowd Called Gentile – bass guitar
- The Slammer – drums
- Sheriff John Stone – keyboards
- The Many Tentacles – keyboards, engineering
- Sean "The Bison" Phillips – guitar (on "I Used to Fall in Love")
- Lisa Millett – vocals (on "Vision Incision")
- Ben Mitchell – keyboards (on "Vision Incision")

== Charts ==
| Chart | Peak position |
|---|---|
| UK Albums (OCC) | 15 |
| US Billboard 200 | 115 |
| US Heatseekers Albums (Billboard) | 1 |
