= Agent Provocateur (band) =

British electronica band

- Origin: London, England
- Genres: Big beat; breakbeat; trip hop
- Years active: 1995–1997, 2010
- Labels: Wall of Sound; Epic
- Past members: John Gosling; Matthew Ashman; Dan Peppe; Danny Saber; Lance Burman; Paul Wainwright; Cleo Torez(Cleo Rebecca Mathews)

Agent Provocateur were a British electronica band, consisting of John Gosling, Matthew Ashman (Bow Wow Wow), Dan Peppe, Danny Saber (Black Grape) and Cleo Torez. When Ashman died in 1995 he was replaced on guitar by Lance Burman (formerly of Chiefs of Relief).

== History ==
The band's first single, "Kicks", was released in 1995, and they went on to perform in London supporting Royal Trux. Their second, "Red Tape", was featured in The Jackal, a Bruce Willis action movie. In 1997 they released the album Where the Wild Things Are, which had been started before Ashman's death, and featured Shaun Ryder on vocals on the track "Agent Dan", which was a top 50 hit in the UK when released as a single.

On the fifteenth anniversary of Ashman's death, the band reunited for a tribute concert on 21 November 2010, at the Scala in London, in a show with Adam Ant topping the bill and also featuring later Ashman bands Bow Wow Wow and Chiefs of Relief.

== Discography ==
=== Studio albums ===
- Where the Wild Things Are (1997), Wall of Sound

=== EPs ===
- The Phat and Ratty (1997), Epic

=== Singles ===
Year	Single	UK Singles Chart	Label
1994	"Kicks"/"Spinning"	-	Wall of Sound
1995	"Red Tape"	-	Wall of Sound
1996	"Sabotage!"	-	Epic/Wall of Sound
1996	"You're No Good"	-	Wall of Sound
1997	"Agent Dan"	49	Epic/Wall of Sound
