= DJ Lottie =

British house music disc jockey

- Born: Charlotte Horne; 1972 (age 53–54); Chester, England
- Genre: House music
- Occupations: Record producer, DJ
- Years active: 1988-

Charlotte Horne (born 1972), known professionally as DJ Lottie, is a house music disc jockey and record producer from Chester, England. Lottie is one of the first female DJs to have significant impact in UK dance music.

== Career ==
Horne, born in 1972, grew up in Chester, England. She started DJing c. 1988, initially under the moniker DJ Horny after her surname and then as DJ Lottie. Lottie's career began in Northern England before she moved to work in London clubs in 1993 including a residency at Turnmills. She recorded an Essential Mix for BBC Radio in 1998. By 1999 Lottie had won the best new DJ category at the annual Muzik magazine dance awards, and was one of the first women to have major impact in the UK dance music scene. In 2002, she was the first woman to headline at the Ibiza nightclub Space. In July that same year, she was featured on the cover of Muzik magazine who called her the "Queen of Ibiza" and ranked at number 45 on the world top 100 DJs poll.

Lottie's style of music has been described as both acid house and tech house, and she is also known as an early proponent of "filter disco bass bumping house" though she claims her sound evolves over time. Her career has included standing in for BBC DJ Pete Tong, hosting the radio show Essential Selection.

Lottie has released a number of singles and albums. Her first release was the mix album 7 Live #2 in 1999, and her singles "Bushroot" and "Supakilla" both charted on UK Dance at number 19 and number 13 respectively. She has appeared as a mentor in reality TV series Faking It.

Lottie married Wall of Sound label head Mark Jones and in 2006 they had a son. After a career break she returned to the scene full time in 2010, setting up the Geisha club nights promoting female DJs. As of 2021 Lottie is working for BBC Radio 2 on the Dance Devotion show, including both editing and standing in for host Ana Matronic.

== Discography ==
Singles
Title	Year	Peak chart position		Notes
Title	Year	UK Singles	UK Dance	Notes
"Bushroot"	2000		19	
"Bootyshake"	2002			with Steve Mac and Mutiny
"Supakilla"	2004	87	13	

== Awards ==
- 1999: Ericsson Muzik Awards - Best New DJ
