= Remind Me (Röyksopp song) =

"Remind Me" / "So Easy"

Single by Röyksopp

from the album Melody A.M.
- Released: 5 August 2002
- Recorded: 2001
- Genre: Electronica; trip hop
- Length: 4:04
- Label: Wall of Sound (UK); Astralwerks (US)
- Songwriters: Svein Berge; Torbjørn Brundtland; Erlend Øye

Röyksopp singles chronology
"Poor Leno" (2001)	"Remind Me" / "So Easy" (2002)	"Sparks" (2003)

"Remind Me" is the fourth single by Norwegian duo Röyksopp. The single version of "Remind Me" is a remix by English duo Someone Else and is substantially different from the album version. The vocals on the song are provided by Kings of Convenience singer Erlend Øye.

"Remind Me" was also released as a double A-side single with "So Easy" after the latter was used by telecommunications company T-Mobile in a 2002 television advertisement in the UK; the single reached number 21 on the UK Singles Chart. The song would also later be included in a 2006 U.S. advertisement for GEICO insurance.

== Composition ==
"Remind Me" is a cheery easy listening song with instruments of wavy acid house-style bass notes, mellow synthesizers, and jazz-influenced percussion backing a 1960s-esque dreamy vocal line.

== Release and reception ==
The double A-side single was released on 5 August 2002, a week before Melody A.M. was officially re-released on 12 August 2002, and did well commercially in the United Kingdom. On the UK Singles Chart it debuted at its peak position of number 21. The song garnered critical acclaim. A writer for the Trouser Press called "Remind Me" close to perfect, while Billboard's Michael Paoletta honored it as a "potent club track".

== Commercial usage ==
"Remind Me" has become somewhat famous in the United States due to its association with GEICO Insurance. In the fourth GEICO caveman-themed advertisement a caveman dressed in contemporary attire and carrying a tennis racket is on a moving walkway at an airport. He spots a billboard for GEICO featuring an overly silly representation of a caveman, along with the insulting phrase, "So easy, a caveman could do it." The album version of "Remind Me" plays in the background throughout.

== Music video ==
The music video for "Remind Me" was directed by Ludovic Houplain and Hervé de Crécy of the French motion graphics studio H5. It shows a day in the life of a woman working in London's Square Mile solely through infographics; this includes labelled close-ups of everyday objects, product lifecycles, schematic diagrams, charts, and is generally illustrated in a simple isometric visual style. "Someone Else's Radio Mix" is the mix used for the audio track in accordance with the single release. The clip won the award for Best Video at the 2002 MTV Europe Music Awards. In 2003 Slant Magazine placed it at #74 on its list of the 100 greatest music videos of all time.

An advertisement for Areva, also created by H5, employs a very similar visual style.

== Track listings ==
=== "Remind Me" ===
UK promo CD (WALLD074)

1. "Remind Me" (Someone Else's Radio Remix) – 4:03
2. "Remind Me" (Tom Middleton Cosmos Mix) – 8:45
3. "Remind Me" (album version) – 3:40

UK 12" 1 (WALLT074)

1. "Remind Me" (Someone Else's Club Mix) – 3:41
2. "Remind Me" (James Zabiela's Ingeborg Mix) – 8:34

UK 12" 2 (WALLT074X)

1. "Remind Me" (Tom Middleton Cosmos Mix) – 8:45
2. "Remind Me" (Ernest Saint Laurent's Moonfish Mix) – 6:48

=== "Remind Me" / "So Easy" ===
UK CD 1 (WALLD074X)

1. "Remind Me" (Someone Else's Radio Remix) – 4:03
2. "So Easy" – 3:44
3. "Remind Me" (James Zabiela's Ingeborg Mix) – 8:35

UK CD 2 (WALLD074R)

1. "So Easy" – 3:44
2. "Remind Me" (album version) – 3:40
3. "Remind Me" (Tom Middleton Cosmos Mix) – 8:45

== See also ==
- Information graphics
