= Chelonis R. Jones =

American artist and musician

- Origin: United States
- Genres: Electropop
- Occupations: Musician; painter; poet; producer
- Website: chelonisrjones.com

Chelonis R. Jones is an American painter, electropop musician, producer, poet, singer, and songwriter.

== Biography ==
Born and raised in California and New York, Jones lives in Europe. He has released several albums, both as a solo artist and in collaboration with other musicians. Some of his releases include Dislocated Genius (2002), The Forgotten Floor (2008, together with Alex Dandi as 4Gottenfloor), Chatterton (2009), and The Prison Buffet (2013). His earliest single releases included cover artwork edited from original oil canvases painted in the late 1990s by the artist. Jones is perhaps best known as the vocalist and co-writer of the popular Röyksopp single "49 Percent", which appeared on the duo's album The Understanding.

Apart from his focus on music, Jones also exhibits his artworks at various galleries, mostly in Europe.

== Discography ==
=== Solo ===
Studio albums

- Dislocated Genius (2002)
- The Forgotten Floor (Chelonis R. Jones | Alex Dandi as 4GOTTENFLOOR) (2008)
- The Forgotten (Dance) Floor Part 01 (Chelonis R. Jones | Alex Dandi as 4GOTTENFLOOR) (2009)
- The Forgotten (Dance) Floor Part 02 (Chelonis R. Jones | Alex Dandi as 4GOTTENFLOOR) (2009)
- Chatterton (2009)
- The Prison Buffet (2012)
- The Prison Buffet: The Remixes (2013)

Singles

- "One & One" (2002)
- "Blackout!" (2002)
- "I Don't Know?" (2003)
- "I Don't Know? Remixes" (2004)
- "Le Bateau Ivre" (2004)
- "The Rush (Sex with the Machines)" (2004)
- "Deer in the Headlights" (2005)
- "Na Na Na" (2006, featured on GPM Label Anniversary)
- "Dirty Lipstick" (2007)
- "Rehabilitation" (2009)
- "The Cockpit" (2009)
- "Pompadour" (2009)
- "Mythologies" (2012, features on Ten Years Get Physical)
- "The Irritant (Brain Damage Club)" (2012)
- "I Don't Know? (2012 Remixes Pt. 1)" (2012)
- "I Don't Know? (2012 Remixes Pt. 2)" (2012)

=== 4Gottenfloor ===
- The Forgotten Floor (2008)
- The Forgotten (Dance) Floor Part 01 (2009)
- The Forgotten (Dance) Floor Part 02 (2009)

=== Selected collaborations ===
- Booka Shade (featuring Chelonis R. Jones) – "S.T.A.R.R.Z." (2004, featured in Memento)
- Booka Shade (featuring Chelonis R. Jones) – "Stupid Questions" (2004)
- Röyksopp (featuring Chelonis R. Jones) – "49 Percent" (2005, featured in The Understanding)
- Röyksopp (featuring Chelonis R. Jones) – "Go Away" (2005, featured in The Understanding and Röyksopp's Night Out)
- DJ Remo (featuring Chelonis R. Jones) – "Empire" (2005)
- DJ Remo (featuring Chelonis R. Jones) – "Black Sabrina" (2005)
- Bioground (featuring Chelonis R. Jones) – "Complexity" (2005, featured in Love Addiction)
- Huntemann (featuring Chelonis R. Jones) – "Terminate the Fire" (2005)
- Believers (featuring Chelonis R. Jones) – "(You'll Never Change) the World" (2005)
- Huntemann (featuring Chelonis R. Jones) – "Scary Love" (2005, featured in Fieber)
- Pinktronix (featuring Chelonis R. Jones) – "Crash!" (2006, featured in Right On Delay)
- Franz & Shape (featuring Chelonis R. Jones) – "God Lost My Address" (2005/2006, featured in Destination/Location and Acceleration)
- Tennishero (featuring Chelonis R. Jones) – "Alone" (2006)
- DJ Remo (featuring Chelonis R. Jones) – "Sabrina Says..." (2007)
- Pinktronix (featuring Chelonis R. Jones) – "Baby Boo" (2007)
- Marc Romboy vs. Chelonis R. Jones – "Helen Cornell" (2007)
- Eddie Thoneick presents Female Deejays (featuring Chelonis R. Jones) – "If Only" (2007)
- Tocadisco (featuring Chelonis R. Jones) – "Shrine" (2007)
- Corrugated Tunnel (featuring Chelonis R. Jones) – "Beautifully Lost" (2008)
- Crackdown (featuring Chelonis R. Jones) – "The Wassily Chair" (2008)
- Urban Hussy (featuring Chelonis R. Jones and Edwin James) – "Mardi Gras" (2008)
- El Carlitto (featuring Chelonis R. Jones) – "On and On" (2008)
- C. Banx (featuring Chelonis R. Jones) – "Destination Unknown" (2008)
- Marc Romboy (featuring Chelonis R. Jones) – "The Slam!" (2008, featured in Contrast)
- Marc Romboy (featuring Chelonis R. Jones) – "The Beat" (2008, featured in Contrast)
- Marc Romboy (featuring Chelonis R. Jones) – "Side FX" (2008, featured in Contrast)
- Pinktronix (featuring Chelonis R. Jones) – "Back to Black" (2008)
- Bush II Bush (featuring Chelonis R. Jones) – "My Salvation" (2008)
- Jochen Pash (featuring Chelonis R. Jones) – "Mathematics" (2008)
- Lorenzo Montana (featuring Chelonis R. Jones) – "Erasing You" (2009, featured in Black Ivy)
- Spektre (featuring Chelonis R. Jones) – "The Ride" (2009)
- Marc Romboy vs. Chelonis R. Jones – "The Beat" (2009)
- Booka Shade (featuring Chelonis R. Jones) – "Bad Love" (2010, featured in More!)
- Utah Jazz (featuring Chelonis R. Jones) – "Avoiding Puddles" (2010, featured in Vintage)
- Kris Menace (featuring Chelonis R. Jones) – "Voodoo Dilate (Samo)" (2012, featured in Features)
- Booka Shade (featuring Chelonis R. Jones) – "Blackout: White Noise" (2012, featured in Blackout: White Noise EP)
- Thomas Schumacher (featuring Chelonis R. Jones) – "Is Your Kettle On?" (2013, featured in Stand Up)
- Full Intention (featuring Chelonis R. Jones) – "All Right" (2013)
