= Jon Carter =

English DJ (born 1970)

- Also known as: Monkey Mafia
- Born: 1970 (age 55–56); Essex, England
- Origin: Portsmouth, Hampshire, England
- Genres: Big beat, electronic
- Instruments: Keyboards, turntables
- Years active: 1992–2004
- Label: Wall of Sound
- Spouse: Sara Cox (m. 2001; div. 2005)

Jon Carter (born 1970 in Essex, England) is an English electronic musician. He initially rose to prominence in the 1990s as a big beat DJ. However, as his career progressed both his productions and his DJ sets began including a variety of musical styles. From 2004 onwards, he began to scale back his DJing due to tinnitus, but simultaneously launched a second career as a businessman, co-founding a company that runs a chain of live music pubs across London.

== DJ and production career ==
Carter began his musical career playing in bands when he was at Southampton University. Dropping out of his studies, he moved back to London and started to learn studio engineering, ending up working in the No U-Turn studios which at the time was involved in the nascent jungle scene of the early 1990s. During his spare time, Carter began making his own tracks, which caught the ear of Mark Jones, the founder of the Wall of Sound record label. Carter was eventually signed to Wall of Sound and released his first record "The Dollar" under the name Artery.

At around the same time, Carter was one of the regular DJs at The Heavenly Social, a Sunday evening club in the Albany pub on Great Portland Street in central London. Alongside the other regular DJs the Chemical Brothers, Fatboy Slim and Richard Fearless of Death in Vegas, the night was instrumental in developing the form of electronic dance music that became known as big beat, with its mix of rock, hip hop and breakbeat, as well as dance.

In 1995, Carter left Wall of Sound and signed with Heavenly Records to produce dub and dancehall-influenced dance music under the name of Monkey Mafia. The project developed into a full band playing live shows, and an album, Shoot the Boss, appeared in 1998. By now he was also in demand to produce mix albums and remix songs by bands as diverse as U2, Manic Street Preachers and the Beach Boys. By the end of the 1990s he had secured DJ residencies at several nightclubs in the UK and was regularly playing sets abroad.

In 1999, Carter moved back to Wall of Sound and its new subsidiary Nu Camp to release "Women Beat Their Men", a house record under the new pseudonym of Junior Cartier. In 2003, he and fellow DJ Tim Sheridan formed a short-lived record company, Saville Row, and released a few singles on the label.

A severe bout of tinnitus curtailed his activity as a DJ and brought a halt to his record productions for a couple of years, but by 2008 Carter had returned, first with another one-off collaboration with Tim Sheridan, and then "The Rabbit" with Stretch Silvester of Stretch & Vern, the first single in a planned series of collaborations with other DJs under the name Gentleman's Agreement. He has also teamed up with Liverpool-born, New York-based DJ Alex Blanco under the name Roosevelt High. In 2009, he became a member of the Rizla Invisible Players, an ever-changing collective of musicians and artists. Alongside Carter, the 2009 line-up included Jazzie B, Micachu, Gruff Rhys and David Shrigley and performed at a number of festivals across the UK that year, including RockNess, Lovebox, The Big Chill and Bestival.

== Business ventures ==
Carter's first foray into business was in 1998 when he became co-owner of The Lock Tavern pub in Camden, London. In 2004, he co-founded 580 Limited, a company which owned several live music pub venues, initially across the UK but later solely in London. Working with the company, Carter helped to set up The Lock Tavern Tent at the Glastonbury Festival from 2003 until 2010, and a Lock Tavern arena at the Field Day festival in 2010. The company was also involved with the Beacons Festival that takes place annually near Skipton in North Yorkshire. In October 2014, the four pubs in the 580 Limited chain were sold to the brewer Young's.

== Personal life ==
Carter married model-turned-DJ/presenter Sara Cox in October 2001. Their daughter Lola Anne was born on 13 June 2004. In December 2005, the couple separated and then divorced the following year. He has since married his second wife Nina. Carter also has a son from a previous relationship.

== Discography ==
(taken from Discogs.com)

=== Studio albums ===
Monkey Mafia:

- 1998: Shoot the Boss (Heavenly Records)

=== Singles and EPs ===
Artery (with Mark Jones):

- 1994: "The Dollar" (Wall of Sound)

The Naked All-Stars (with Derek Dahlarge):

- 1996: "Hot Pursuit" (Wall of Sound)

Monkey Mafia:

- 1995: "Blow the Whole Joint Up" (Heavenly Records)
- 1996: "Work Mi' Body" (featuring Patra) (Heavenly Records)
- 1997: 15 Steps EP (Heavenly Records)
- 1998: "Long As I Can See the Light" (Heavenly Records)
- 1998: "Work Mi' Body" (remixes) (Heavenly Records)
- 2012: "Royal Ascot" (Nice Up!)

Junior Cartier:

- 1999: "Women Beat Their Men" (Nu Camp)

Jon Carter:

- 2002: "Everlasting Life" (Bugged Out!)
- 2002: "Humanism" (Shine)
- 2003: "Go Down" (Saville Row)
- 2004: "The Dance" (Saville Row)

Tim Sheridan/Jon Carter:

- 2003: "Justice Is a Must"/"Need I Say More" (Saville Row)

Tim Sheridan vs. Jon Carter featuring Ferank Manseed:

- 2008: "Freakshow" (Very Very Wrong Indeed Recordings)

Stretch Carter (with Stretch Silvester):

- 2008: "The Rabbit" (Pieces of Eight)

Roosevelt High (with Alex Blanco):

- 2009: "Stevie's Drop"

=== DJ mix albums ===
- 1996: Essential Mix 4: Pete Tong/Paul Oakenfold/Jon Carter (third CD of a three-CD set) (FFRR)
- 1996: Live at the Social Volume 2 (Heavenly Records)
- 2000: 7 Live #1 (DMC Publishing)
- 2002: Viva Bugged Out! (Virgin)
- 2003: Acid House Reborn! (Mixmag)
- 2004: Ministry of Sound Saturday Sessions (with Mark Hughes) (Ministry of Sound)

=== Notable remixes ===
- 1996: The Prodigy - "Mindfields" (Monkey Mafia Mix)
- 1996: Saint Etienne – "Filthy" (Monkey Mafia Vocal Mix)
- 1996: Manic Street Preachers – "Kevin Carter" (Busts Loose)
- 1997: U2 – "Last Night on Earth" (First Night in Hell Mix)
- 1998: 808 State – "Cubik" (Monkey Mafia Remix)
- 1999: The Beach Boys – "God Only Knows" (Jon Carter Remix)
- 2000: Mekon – "What's Going On?" (Junior Cartier Remix)
- 2000: The Stone Roses – "I Am the Resurrection" (Jon Carter Remix)
- 2001: Stereo MCs – "Deep Down and Dirty" (Jon Carter Club Mix)
- 2001: U2 – "Elevation" (Escalation Mix)
- 2002: Happy Mondays – "24 Hour Party People" (Jon Carter Remixes)
- 2004: Fatboy Slim – "Jin Go Lo Ba" (Jon Carter Remix)
- 2005: Gorillaz – "Dirty Harry" (Jon Carter Remix)
