= 49 Percent =

2005 single by Röyksopp

Single by Röyksopp

from the album The Understanding
- Released: 26 September 2005
- Length: 5:11
- Label: Astralwerks
- Songwriter(s): Svein Berge, Torbjørn Brundtland, Chelonis R. Jones

Röyksopp singles chronology
"Curves" (2005)	"49 Percent" (2005)	"What Else Is There?" (2005)

Music video
- "49 Percent" on YouTube

"49 Percent" is the second single from Norwegian duo Röyksopp's second album, The Understanding (2005). It features the vocals and lyrics of Chelonis R. Jones. The song initially was written as "Don't Give Up" and sung in live shows, then was developed into "49 Percent" and "Don't Give Up" was covered by the band The Whitest Boy Alive.

== Release ==
The single was released on 26 September 2005 in the United Kingdom. It reached number 55 on the UK Singles Chart.

== Music video ==
The music video, directed by Brendan McNamee, features a man running and dancing in the streets of Barcelona at nighttime, producing light from his hands and feet on everything he touches and hovers over.

== Track listing ==
1. "49 Percent (Radio Edit)" – 3:33
2. "49 Percent (Angello & Ingrosso Remix)" – 9:18
3. "Curves" – 4:59

== Charts ==
Weekly chart performance for "49 Percent"
Chart (2005)	Peak position
CIS Airplay (TopHit)	322
UK Singles (OCC)	55
