= Marianne Schröder =

Norwegian model

Marianne Schröder is a Norwegian model. She was born in Smøla Municipality, Norway on 11 March 1977.

== Career ==
Schröder has modeled for Ambiente, Boss by Hugo Boss, Celine, Jil Sander, Lacoste, Marc O'Polo, and Missoni, and has been on the cover of Vogue. Schröder can be seen in the Röyksopp music video for the song "What Else Is There?". Schröder also graced the inaugural cover of Vogue Portugal in November 2002.
