= John Gosling (Psychic TV musician) =

English electronic musician

- Also known as: Joan D'Arc, Mekon, Sugar J, Zoskia
- Born: 16 October 1963 (age 63); Brighton, England, United Kingdom
- Genres: Electronica, big beat, trip hop, electro-industrial, alternative dance
- Occupation: Musician
- Label: Wall of Sound

John Gosling (born 16 October 1963, Brighton), currently known as Mekon, is an English big beat and industrial musician and electronica producer.

Gosling is well known as a member of Psychic TV. Gosling founded the group Zos Kia, Psychic TV (during 1984), and Bass-o-Matic (with William Orbit) before recording as Mekon. and teamed up with Coil for the album Transparent. He has also done extensive remixing work under the name "Sugar J".

His first single was "Phatty's Lunch Box", which was followed by "Revenge of the Mekon", which featured Frankie Fraser; Gosling met Fraser in Islington shortly after reading a biography of the former gangster, and they subsequently recorded three hours of Fraser reminiscing on his past, excerpts of which were used on the single.

In the mid-to-late-Nineties he was a core member of the group Agent Provocateur along with Matthew Ashman (originally of Bow Wow Wow), Dan Peppe, Danny Saber (of Black Grape) and Cleo Torez.

He has worked with artists such as Schoolly D (on the Skool's Out album), Roxanne Shanté ("Yes Yes Y'All"), Marc Almond ("Delerious"), Bobby Gillespie, Alan Vega, and Afrika Bambaataa. His third album, Something Came Up, featured artwork by fashion designer Alexander McQueen.

Mekon's remix of the Infadels single "Can't Get Enough" appeared on an episode of Hex, a hit show originally shown on Sky One in the UK, and later on BBC America. It also featured on the FIFA 07 soundtrack. His song "What's Going On" is featured on the PlayStation 2 game ATV Offroad Fury 2 as well as the video game Amplitude.

== Discography ==
Zos Kia

- Transparent as Zos Kia/Coil on CD, CS, 12" vinyl (1984)
- Rape/Thank You on 7" vinyl (1984)
- Be Like Me on 12" vinyl (1985)
- Rape on 12" vinyl (1985)
- That's Heavy Baby (with Sugardog) on 7" and 12" vinyl (1987)
- 23 on 2CD, 2CS, 3x12" vinyl (2017)

with Psychic TV

- Berlin Atonal Vol. 1 (1984)
- Berlin Atonal Vol. 2 (1984)
- Unclean (1984)
- Descending (1985)
- Themes 2 (1985)
- Live in Heaven (1987)
- Live at Thee Mardi Gras (1988)
- A Real Swedish Live Show (1989)
- Live at Thee Ritz (LP) Temple Records (1989)
- Mein-Goett-In-Gen (1994)
- Those Who Do Not (1997)
- Godstar: Thee Director's Cut (2004)
- Mary Never Wanted Jesus

with Jam Nation

- as Mekong on A Brief History of Ambient Volume 2: Imaginary Landscapes and C & S Street Jazz Presents Give 'Em Enough Dope Volume Two

with Bassomatic

- Set the Controls for the Heart of the Bass (1990)

with Agent Provocateur

- Where the Wild Things Are (1997)

Other

- The Melancholy Mad Tenant

as Mekon

- Welcome to Tackletown (Wall of Sound) – 1997
- Relax with... Mekon (Wall of Sound) – 2000
- Some Thing Came Up (PIAS Recordings) – 2006

== See also ==
- ATV Offroad Fury 2
- Amplitude (video game)
