= Only This Moment =

Single by Röyksopp

from the album The Understanding
- B-side: "Sombre Detune"
- Released: 27 June 2005
- Length: 3:41
- Label: Astralwerks
- Songwriters: Kate Havnevik, Svein Berge, Torbjørn Brundtland

Röyksopp singles chronology
"Sparks" (2003)	"Only This Moment" (2005)	"Curves" (2005)

"Only This Moment" is the first single from Norwegian duo Röyksopp's second album, The Understanding (2005). The track features Kate Havnevik on guest vocals and co-writing.

== Reception ==
The single was released on 27 June 2005 in the United Kingdom and reached number 33 on the UK Singles Chart.

== Music video ==
The music video for "Only This Moment" is closely based on the events of May 1968. The video contains riots, banners and elements of propaganda. It was directed by Brendan McNamee and Robert Chandler.

== Track listing ==
1. "Only This Moment" (radio edit) – 3:41
2. "Only This Moment" (Röyksopp's Hissige) – 6:15
3. "Only This Moment" (Headman Remix) – 7: 05
4. "Only This Moment" (Chab Remix) – 8:41
5. "Only This Moment" (Alan Braxe & Fred Falke Remix) – 6:34
6. "Only This Moment" (Royksopp's Forsiktige Massasje) – 4:57
7. "Sombre Detune" – 4:58

== Charts ==
Chart performance for "Only This Moment"
Chart (2005)	Peak position
Belgium (Ultratip Bubbling Under Wallonia)	15
Italy (FIMI)	43
Netherlands (Single Top 100)	86
UK Singles (Official Charts)	33
