= Sparks (Röyksopp song) =

Single by Röyksopp

from the album Melody A.M.
- Released: 16 June 2003
- Recorded: 2001
- Genre: Electronica; trip hop
- Length: 5:25
- Label: Astralwerks
- Songwriters: Svein Berge; Torbjørn Brundtland; Anneli Drecker

Röyksopp singles chronology
"Remind Me" (2002)	"Sparks" (2003)	"Only This Moment" (2005)

"Sparks" is the fifth single from the Norwegian duo Röyksopp. It is the last single from Röyksopp's debut album Melody A.M.. The vocals are provided by Norwegian singer Anneli Drecker.

== Response ==
The single was released in 2003 in the UK and late 2003 worldwide. The single peaked at #41 on the UK Singles Chart.

== Track listings ==
UK CD1

1. "Sparks" (Edit) – 3:06
2. "Don't Go" – 7:20
3. "So Easy" (Derrick Carter Remix)

UK CD2

1. "Sparks" (Roni Size Edit) – 3:26
2. "Sparks" (Mandy Remix) – 8:55
3. "Sparks" (Murk Downtown Miami Mix) – 8:23
4. "Remind Me" (Someone Else's Mix) – 3:45
5. "Remind Me" (Video) – 4:05

== Versions ==
There are several versions of "Sparks" that were released.

1. Sparks (Radio Mix)
2. Sparks (Roni Size Edit)
3. Sparks (Murk Downtown Miami Mix)
4. Sparks (Roni Size Mix)
5. Sparks (Roni Size Instrumental)
6. Sparks (Losoul Remix)

The track "Don't Go" features on some versions of this single.

== Chart positions ==
Chart (2003)	Position
UK Singles Chart	41

== Use of the song in popular culture ==
"Sparks" was featured in the TV series Six Feet Under, season 2 episode 6 (about 51 minutes into the episode). It is played in a scene with Nate entering Brenda’s apartment, finding her hard at work on her computer writing her novel. The two of them talk about people choosing to stay together through bad relationships.
