= What Else Is There? =

Single by Röyksopp featuring Karin Dreijer Andersson

from the album The Understanding
- B-side: "Alpha Male (Live from Roskilde)", "Clean Sweep"
- Released: 21 November 2005
- Genre: Electropop; trip hop
- Length: 5:17
- Label: Astralwerks
- Songwriters: Svein Berge; Torbjørn Brundtland; Karin Dreijer; Olof Dreijer; Roger Greenaway; Robert Huxley; Anthony Instone; Danny Shoshan; Roger John

Röyksopp singles chronology
"49 Percent" (2005)	"What Else Is There?" (2005)	"Beautiful Day Without You" (2006)

Music video
- "What Else Is There?" on YouTube

"What Else Is There?" is the third single from the Norwegian duo Röyksopp's second album The Understanding. It features the vocals of Karin Dreijer from the Swedish electronica duo The Knife. The album was released in the UK with the help of Astralwerks.

The single was used in an O2 television advertisement in the Czech Republic and in Slovakia during 2008. It was also used in the 2006 film Cashback and the 2007 film, Meet Bill. Trentemøller's remix of "What Else is There?" was featured in an episode of the HBO show Entourage.

The song was covered by extreme metal band Enslaved as a bonus track for their album E in 2017, by German techno marching band MEUTE in 2020, and by the one-man goth metal band Mortemia for their singles collection The Pandemic Pandemonium Sessions in 2022.

The song was listed as the 375th best song of the 2000s by Pitchfork Media.

== Official versions ==
1. "What Else Is There?" (Album Version) – 5:17
2. "What Else Is There?" (Radio Edit) – 3:38
3. "What Else Is There?" (Jacques Lu Cont Radio Mix) – 3:46
4. "What Else Is There?" (The Emperor Machine Vocal Version) – 8:03
5. "What Else Is There?" (The Emperor Machine Dub Version) – 7:51
6. "What Else Is There?" (Thin White Duke Mix) – 8:25
7. "What Else Is There?" (Thin White Duke Edit) – 4:50
8. "What Else Is There?" (Thin White Duke Remix) (Radio Edit) – 3:06
9. "What Else Is There?" (Trentemøller Remix) – 7:42
10. "What Else Is There?" (Vitalic Remix) – 5:14

== Response ==
The single was officially released on 5 December 2005 in the UK. The single had a limited release on 21 November 2005 to promote the upcoming album. On the UK Singles Chart, it peaked at number 32, while on the UK Dance Chart, it reached number one.

== Music video ==
The music video was directed by Martin de Thurah. It features Norwegian model Marianne Schröder who is shown lip-syncing Dreijer's voice. Schröder is depicted as a floating woman traveling across stormy landscapes and within empty houses. Dreijer makes a cameo appearance as a woman wearing an Elizabethan ruff while dining alone at a festive table.

== Movie spots ==
The song is also featured in the movie Meet Bill as characters played by Jessica Alba and Aaron Eckhart smoke marijuana while listening to it. It is also part of the end credits music of the film Cashback.

It also features in the survival thriller 'Breaking Surface' (2020).

== Charts ==
Chart performance for "What Else Is There?"
Chart (2005–2006)	Peak position
Belgium (Ultratip Bubbling Under Flanders)	2
Belgium (Ultratip Bubbling Under Wallonia)	5
CIS Airplay (TopHit)	–
Germany (GfK)	76
Greece (IFPI)	25
Norway (VG-lista)	4
Sweden (Sverigetopplistan)	30
UK Dance (Official Charts)	1
UK Singles (Official Charts)	32
