= Req =

English DJ, record producer, and graffiti artist

- Also known as: Req 1; DJ Req
- Born: Ian Cassar; 20 February 1966 (age 59); Brighton, England
- Genres: Trip hop; downtempo
- Occupations: DJ; record producer; graffiti artist
- Years active: 1984–present
- Labels: Skint; Warp

Ian Cassar (born 20 February 1966), better known as Req (stylized as REQ), is an English DJ, record producer, and graffiti artist.

== Career ==
In the words of AllMusic's Sean Cooper, Req began in his native Brighton as "one of the U.K.'s most respected graffiti artists." He began his graffiti work in 1984 after the Beat Street film hyped his sense to the basic tenets of hip hop. Although he was a disc jockey for many years without musical training, Req only began producing music of his own in the mid-1990s when he signed to Skint Records, who issued his earliest releases. As a graffiti artist, he had previously been a member of the largely musical collective Beats International.

His debut album, One, was critically acclaimed by such publications as The Wire and production duo Coldcut. In 2015, Fact ranked the album at number 14 in their list of "The 50 Best Trip-Hop Albums of All Time" and noted "his compositions didn't pander to the popularity of the growing trip-hop scene, instead dwelling in a noisy, near-ambient back room." His follow-up album, Frequency Jams (1998), was made an "Album Pick" on AllMusic. He released Car Paint Scheme in 2000, and Sketchbook in 2002.

== Discography ==
=== Studio albums ===
- One (1997)
- Frequency Jams (1998)
- Car Paint Scheme (2000)
- Sketchbook (2002)

=== Compilation albums ===
- TDK (2019) (with Rob Euroh)
- Tape Transport: 1994-2000 (2019)

=== EPs ===
- Req's Garden (1995)
- Miracles (1996)
- Fantasy Roc (1996)
- Split Series #7 (1999) (split with Team Doyobi)
- Daily Beats 1 (1999)
- Daily Beats 2 (1999)
- Daily Beats 3 (1999)
- Deqjam (2000) (with Ashley Slater and Steve Argüelles)
- Calypso Dark (2020)

=== Singles ===
- "Breakin' at the Seams" b/w "Concentrate and Believe" (2000) (with Rob Euroh)
