= Gals and Pals =

Swedish vocal group

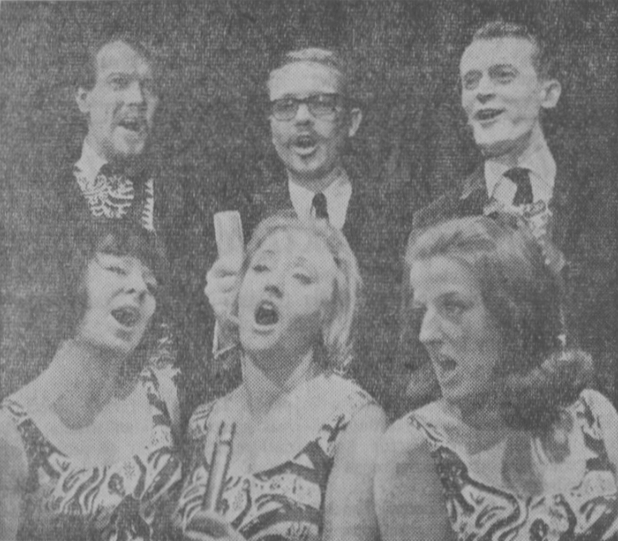
Gals and Pals

Gals and Pals was a Swedish vocal group founded in 1962 by Lasse Bagge. The group was active until 1967. The ensemble's first members were, besides Bagge: Kerstin Bagge, Ulla Hallin, Pia Lang, Svante Thuresson, Leppe Sundevall and Beppo Gräsman. Later, members included Monica Dominique, Gillis Broman and Lena Willemark. The first time the group was on stage was in the show "FiFajFoFum eller Hur" in Berns Salonger in 1963, together with Catrin Westerlund and Carl-Gustaf Lindstedt.

Many of the Gals and Pals Swedish lyrics were written by Beppe Wolgers, but the group also collaborated with Povel Ramel and Tage Danielsson and Hans Alfredson. Their non-Swedish repertoire consisted largely of songs written by Burt Bacharach. The Gals and Pals version of the Bacharach song Blue on Blue was sampled by Norwegian duo Röyksopp, released as their first single So Easy. It was first made available in 1999, with only 500 copies made and distributed. It was later re-released on Röyksopp's debut album Melody A.M. and was subsequently used in displays between programs on Nickelodeon UK and Channel 4, as well as in British television adverts for T-Mobile (now EE).

== Discography ==
- Gals and Pals sings Gals and Pals' favorites (1964)
- Gals and Pals på nya äfventyr (1965)
- Sing Something for Everyone (1966)
- I San Francisco (1967)
- Vocals 1963-1967 (1993)
- Guldkorn (2000)
