= Mark Jones (Wall of Sound) =

Mark Raymond Jones
- Born: Hayes, Middlesex, England
- Occupations: Musician, founder of Wall of Sound record label
- Website: wallofsound.net

Mark Jones is an English musician and the founder of Wall of Sound record label.

== Early life ==
Mark was born in Hayes, Middlesex. Jones went to art college and left after one day to form a visuals company called Pop with Michael Speechley. He went on to work with Nicky Holloway, putting on the Special Branch parties at The Royal Oak, The Zoo, Rockley Sands, Mambo Madness and many other acid house parties such as Trip, Sin and Shoom.

== Career ==
Jones formed the prock (pop/rock) band Perfect Day, who performed on Trevor and Simon on BBC Television, and appeared on the front cover of Just Seventeen and Jackie magazines. The band were signed by London Records, released 5 singles, and supported Bananarama on their 1998 tour.

After Perfect Day disbanded, he joined with Marc Lessner, and started working at Soul Trader record distributors one day a week, which soon turned into a full-time occupation. There he started pressing and distributing deals for small labels and acts such as Kruder and Dorfmeister, Basement Jaxx and Larry Heard among others. A compilation of these artists was made and entitled Give 'Em Enough Dope Vol.1, and in 1994 Wall of Sound was officially launched.

Jones signed Stuart Price to Wall of Sound, and created his Les Rythmes Digitales alias. In 2000 Jones was named by Muzik magazine as one of the 50 most powerful people in dance music.

== Personal life ==
Jones married DJ Lottie in 2006. They have a son together.
