= Midfield General =

English DJ (born 1969)

- Born: Damian Harris; 1969 (age 56–57); Whitstable, Kent, England
- Origin: London, England
- Genres: Big beat, electronica
- Years active: 1997-present
- Label: Skint Records

Damian Harris, also known by his stage name Midfield General, is the original founder of the Skint Records label.

A prime architect of the sound of big beat, Harris grew up listening first to punk rock, later hip hop, and acid house. He then moved to Brighton to study art, eventually taking work as a DJ while promoting clubs around the city. In 1994, his music knowledge landed him a job at Loaded Records, where former Housemartins member Norman Cook – a friend of Harris' since his days working at the Rounder store in Brighton – recorded as Pizzaman. He is a fan of Arsenal Football Club and has a season ticket at the Emirates Stadium. He has also appeared on episodes of the It's Up For Grabs Now and The Tuesday Club podcasts about Arsenal with Alan Davies and Ian Stone. He also released a song called "Midfielding" featuring a monologue from surrealist comedian Noel Fielding.

== Discography ==
=== Studio albums ===
- Generalisation (2000)
- General Disarray (2008)

=== Live albums ===
- On the Floor at the Boutique – Volume 3 (2000)

=== Singles ===
Year	Single	UK Singles Chart	Album
1995	"Worlds / Bung"	-	
1996	"Stigs in Love"	-	Generalisation
1997	"Devil in Sports Casual"	-	Generalisation
2000	"Coatnoise"	-	Generalisation
2000	"General of the Midfield"	-	Generalisation
2000	"Reach Out"	-	Generalisation
2001	"You Take"	-	Generalisation
2008	"Disco Sirens"	-	General Disarray

== 'Devil in Sports Casual' ==
"We were in New York for a record company schmooze," recalled Harris, "and Lindy Layton was there as well, going round recording people talking in the streets. She came back very excited because she'd found this guy ranting in Times Square and mentioning 'Damien'. For the title, I wanted some devil reference because since those fucking Omen films came out I've had people calling me that. The film Devil in a Blue Dress had just come out and I just altered that. A lot of people would take the piss out of me for wearing sports casual gear – which I still claim I looked ace in. I was just ahead of the times!"
