= So Easy =

Single by Röyksopp

from the album Melody A.M.
- Released: 1999
- Recorded: 1999
- Genre: Electronica; ambient; trip hop
- Length: 3:47
- Label: Tellé
- Songwriters: Svein Berge; Torbjørn Brundtland

Röyksopp singles chronology
"So Easy" (1999)	"Eple" (2001)

Alternative cover
- Cover of the original 1999 vinyl release

"So Easy" is a song by Norwegian duo Röyksopp, released as their first single. It was first made available in 1999 with only 500 copies made and distributed. It was later re-released on Röyksopp's debut album Melody A.M. and then as a single again on 5 August 2002. "So Easy" contains instrumental and vocal samples from a 1960s cover version of the Burt Bacharach and Hal David song "Blue on Blue" by Swedish vocal group Gals and Pals. The sampled lyrics are "Blue on blue, heartache on heartache / Blue on blue, now that we are through."

"So Easy" was used in displays between programs on Nickelodeon UK and Channel 4, as well as in British television adverts for T-Mobile (now EE). After the song was featured in these commercials, the single was re-released with the group's hit "Remind Me" as the A-side and "So Easy" as the B-side.

Thorbjørn Brundtland commented on the song, "With regard to all the positive reactions So Easy has received, one can wonder if we really have talent, or if it is just luck."

== Track listings ==
=== Original release ===
1. "So Easy" – 3:44
2. "The 64-Position" – 1:25
3. "Fusion's Allright" – 6:39

=== Re-release ===
1. "Remind Me" (Someone Else's Radio Remix) – 4:03
2. "So Easy" – 3:44
3. "Remind Me" (James Zabiela's Ingeborg Mix) – 8:35

== Charts ==
Chart performance for "So Easy"
Chart (2002)	Peak position
UK Singles (Official Charts)	21
