= Dan Peppe =

British record producer

DJ Dan Peppe is a British record producer. In the mid to late '90s Peppe was a member of the group, Agent Provocateur alongside John Gosling (of Psychic TV), Matthew Ashman (originally of Bow Wow Wow) Danny Saber (of Black Grape) and Cleo Torez. Peppe went on to record under the name Themroc. He was also a member of Jon Carter's electronica band Monkey Mafia.

In 2000 Peppe released his first material under the Themroc name, which is taken from the title of an avant garde French movie from 1972 by Claude Faraldo.

He has had productions feature on Wipeout Pure, CSI: New York, The Jackal.

In 2009 Peppe remixed the track Atlas by Battles. This remix was then used in a Honda commercial.

Alongside long-term collaborator John Collyer, Peppe composed a series of soundscapes for a ballet at the Royal Opera House in 2016. Other Stories featured Royal Ballet principal Ed Watson and former New York City Ballet principal Wendy Whelan. The ballet featured a programme of five contemporary works created especially for the dancers by choreographers Annie-B Parson, Arlene Philips, Arthur Pita and Javier de Frutos.
