= Lo Fidelity Allstars =

English electronic music group

- Origin: Leeds, England
- Genres: Big beat; Dance/rock crossover; house; trip hop
- Years active: 1996–present
- Labels: Skint; Columbia; Corsair
- Members: Phil Ward; Del Vargas; Britta DeVore; Hannah Dennard
- Past members: Andy Dickinson; Martin Whiteman; Dale Maloney; Johnny Machin; Dave Randall; Matt Harvey

Lo Fidelity Allstars are an English electronic music group who have recorded since the late 1990s.

== Career ==
Their members originate from various cities in Northern England. They were formed in Leeds before relocating first to London, where they came to the attention of major record labels. After signing to Skint Records the band relocated to Brighton on the south coast, where that label is based. Subsequent to parting company with Skint, the band liquidated their Brighton studio complex 'The Brainfarm', and the personnel are now based variously in Brighton, The Midlands and New York.

Their earlier work is noted for genre-crossing stylings, distorted, morose, and at times alien lyrics, distinctive funk bass lines, and extensive use of lo-fi recording practices. This work is best exemplified by their 1998 debut album How to Operate with a Blown Mind on Skint Records. At this time, the Lo Fidelity Allstars were credited by pseudonyms rather than their actual names. After its release, the band's lead vocalist David Randall (credited as The Wrekked Train) left, shortly followed by the keyboard player Matt Harvey (Sheriff John Stone). For their second studio album, Don't Be Afraid of Love, the members of the band discarded their pseudonyms in favor of using their real names.

Before the split, they recorded a mix album On the Floor at the Boutique (a follow-up to Fatboy Slim's mix album of the same name) containing an eclectic selection of tracks, including two short tracks recorded by the original line-up especially for the mix: "You're Never Alone With A Clone," and "Bootsy Call". Another track, "Many Tentacles Pimping on the Keys," was also included which was released previously as "Disco Machine Gun Part 2" on the "Disco Machine Gun" EP in September 1997.

The 2002 album Don't Be Afraid of Love included a number of guest vocalists, including funk luminary Bootsy Collins.

2007 saw the release on Skint Records of the double CD Warming Up the Brain Farm: The Best of, a compilation featuring tracks from the first two albums along with rare and unreleased tracks.

The group's third studio album Northern Stomp was released on 27 July 2009, on Corsair Records, preceded by the single "Smash & Grab World" which was released worldwide in April, and was the band's first new material for four years.

Northern Stomp was widely well received, with DJ Magazine giving 4 stars, saying "This is a fully-blown band album dripping with (northern) soul. The Lo-Fis are back and they deserve adoration all over again" and the world's best selling music monthly Q calling it "a dance-tinged hybrid that becomes more fascinating with each listen".

The second single taken from the album was "Your Midnight" which featured remixes from Phil Ward's alter ego Lord Warddd and label mate IDC, released on 31 August 2009.

The band continued to release a string of occasional singles on Corsair Records up to 'Darkness Rolling' in 2016. Live dates were rare, with an appearance at the inaugural 'Shiiine On Weekender' festival in 2015 being a notable exception. Following the death of drummer Johnny Machin in 2018, the band effectively went on indefinite hiatus.

Late 2025 saw a new website and an announcement of a short Easter 2026 UK tour to be accompanied by the release of a new compilation album 'The Corsair Singles'. An EP collection of remixes became available in late 2025, which was only available on the band's Bandcamp page and included two tracks re-imagined by Phil Ward. In January 2026, it was also announced that a new 'single mix' of radio-friendly track 'Come Alive' was to be given a pre-tour release.

== Solo work and individual projects ==
When Randall and Harvey left they briefly set up as a new group called The Big Heat, while also recording a live mix for BBC Radio 1's Mary Anne Hobbs show. Randall contributed guest vocals to "The Snow Falls" from The Baldwin Brothers' album The Return of the Golden Rhodes credited as 'The Train' and "Rest Easy" from Half's debut album Here Lies credited as 'Wrecked Train'. In the gap between work on the second and third albums, the band took on another set of pseudonyms to perform live as the group Technically Men. A ten-track album of the same name received a limited release.

In 2008, Ward launched a solo project as Lord Ward, releasing the singles "Brooklyn Blister" and "Rich Boys in Strip Clubs" on Corsair Records. In 2009, he added extra d's at the end - thus becoming "Lord Warddd!, and released several remixes for artists including Matt and Kim, Cubic Zirconia and Hollywood Undead. He continues to play vinyl DJ sets around the world under the Lo Fidelity Allstars banner.

Martin Whiteman serves as one half of 2K Subs.

== Members ==
- Phil Ward (aka The Albino Priest) - vocals, keyboards, programming, production, decks (1996-present)
- Del Vargas - vocals, guitars, bass (2002-present)
- Britta DeVore - drums (2026-present)
- Hannah Dennard - keyboards, vocals (2026-present)

=== Former members ===
- Andy Dickinson (aka A One Man Crowd Called Gentile) - vocals, bass (1996-2019)
- Martin Whiteman (aka Many Tentacles) - vocals, co-production, engineering, mixing (1996-2019)
- Dale Maloney (aka Pele) - keyboards (1998-2019)
- Johnny Machin (aka The Slammer) - drums (1996-2018; his death)
- Dave Randall (aka The Wrekked Train) - vocals (1996-1999)
- Matt Harvey (aka Sheriff John Stone) - keyboards, programming (1996-1999)

== Discography ==
=== Albums ===
List of albums, with selected peak chart positions
| Title | Year | Peak chart positions | |
| Title | Year | UK | US |
|---|---|---|---|
| How to Operate with a Blown Mind | 1998 | 15 | 115 |
| Don't Be Afraid of Love | 2002 | 85 | — |
| Abstract Funk Theory | 2003 | — | — |
| Warming Up the Brain Farm: The Best Of | 2007 | — | — |
| Northern Stomp | 2009 | — | — |

=== EPs ===
- Ghostmutt (2000) No. 8 UK Budget Albums Chart

=== Singles ===
| Year | Title | Peak chart positions | | | | Certifications (sales thresholds) | Album |
| Year | Title | UK | US Modern Rock | AUS | US Dance | Certifications (sales thresholds) | Album |
|---|---|---|---|---|---|---|---|
| 1997 | "Kool Roc Bass" | 83 | — | — | — | | How to Operate with a Blown Mind |
| 1997 | "Disco Machine Gun" | 50 | — | — | — | | Non-album single |
| 1998 | "Vision Incision" | 30 | — | — | — | | How to Operate with a Blown Mind |
| 1998 | "Battle Flag" (featuring Pigeonhed) | 36 | 6 | — | — | | How to Operate with a Blown Mind |
| 1998 | "Blisters on My Brain" | — | — | — | — | | How to Operate with a Blown Mind |
| 2001 | "Lo Fi's in Ibiza" | — | — | 79 | — | | Don't Be Afraid of Love |
| 2002 | "Sleeping Faster" | — | — | 79 | 4 | | Don't Be Afraid of Love |
| 2003 | "Feel What I Feel" | — | — | — | — | | Don't Be Afraid of Love |
| 2009 | "Smash & Grab World" | — | — | — | — | | Northern Stomp |
| 2009 | "Your Midnight" | — | — | — | — | | Northern Stomp |
| 2010 | "Come Alive / The Long Sound" | — | — | — | — | | Non-album singles |
| 2015 | "Fire Reigns / Don't Hate Me 'cause I'm Beautiful" | — | — | — | — | | Non-album singles |
| 2016 | "Darkness Rolling" | — | — | — | — | | Non-album singles |
| 2026 | "Come Alive (26 Mix)" | — | — | — | — | | Non-album singles |
"—" denotes a recording that did not chart or was not released in that territory.

Notes

- "Lo Fi's in Ibiza" and "Sleeping Faster" were released together in Australia.

=== Compilation albums ===
| Year | Title |
|---|---|
| 2000 | On the Floor at the Boutique |
| 2026 | The Corsair Singles |
