= Skint Records =

British dance music record label

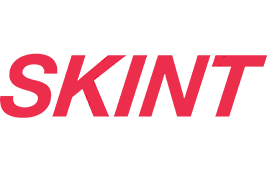
- Parent company: BMG Rights Management (2014-)
- Distributors: Universal Music Group (physical); BMG Rights Management (digital); Sony Music (until 2014)
- Genre: EDM, big beat, indie pop, house
- Official website: www.skintentertainment.com

Skint Records is a Brighton and Hove based dance music record label owned by JC Reid, Tim Jeffery and Damian Harris. It was created as a sublabel of Loaded Records, also founded by Reid and Jeffery. Along with Wall of Sound, the label was a leader in the big beat music scene of the mid to late 1990s.

The label's roster at this time included big beat scene leaders Fatboy Slim, Hardknox, Indian Ropeman, Freq Nasty and X-Press 2. Towards the end of the 1990s and at the start of the 21st century the label expanded its range of releases to include more house based songs. The most prominent example was "Lazy" by X-Press 2, which charted at number 2 in the UK Singles Chart. There were also releases by electronic music artist Dave Clarke as well as artists as diverse as Lucky Jim, Freq Nasty, FC Kahuna, Bentley Rhythm Ace, REQ and Ralfe Band. One mainstay band of the label has been the Lo-Fidelity Allstars who have changed and diversified their style along with the label.

Skint were the main kit sponsor for Brighton & Hove Albion F.C. for nine years until the relationship ended in 2008, one of the longest football league sponsorship deals. The Skint name does not appear consistently across all the Brighton and Hove shirts, with some variation in logo and even the complete replacement of the company's name with Palookaville on one of the shirt designs.

Skint also have a sub-label for more underground releases called "Under 5's", which originally ran from 1997–2001, but was re-launched as a digital only label in 2009 to host new artists such as Linton Brown, Kinzy and Rory Hoy.

In 2002, Skint released a compilation album, We Are Skint, featuring tracks from the label's artists. From 1996-1998, Skint released a series of albums, Brassic Beats, also containing songs from the label, but all of the songs were new, therefore not being a compilation album series.

Skint Records had one UK number one album, Fatboy Slim's You've Come a Long Way, Baby (1998), and also brought about short-lived "intelligent big beat" pioneered by albums such as REQ's One and Lo-Fidelity Allstars' How to Operate with a Blown Mind.

In April 2014, BMG Rights Management acquired Skint Records. Before the BMG acquisition, Skint Records was distributed by Sony Music Entertainment internationally.

Fatboy Slim's catalogue is owned by Skint and BMG internationally, except in USA and Canada, where it is owned by Universal Music Group under the Astralwerks label.

== See also ==
- List of record labels
- List of independent UK record labels
