= Wall of Sound (record label) =

British independent record label

- Founder: Mark Jones
- Distributor: Believe Digital
- Genre: Various
- Country of origin: UK

Wall of Sound is a British independent record label based in London, England, and was founded by Mark Jones in 1994. They were considered to be "at the center of the revolution" of the big beat movement in the mid- to late-1990s, releasing much of the UK material at the height of the scene alongside Brighton's Skint Records. The label is most known for introducing internationally renowned big beat acts such as Propellerheads, The Wiseguys and Les Rythmes Digitales.

== History ==
The label's first release was the acclaimed compilation album Give 'Em Enough Dope Volume One, which featured many acts such as Mekon, Kruder & Dorfmeister, and The Wiseguys before they became more notable. The compilation is also considered to be foundational to the Big Beat movement of the mid- to late-90s.

The label gained international recognition and residencies were set up in cities around the globe including a yearly summer residency at Ibiza's annual club party Manumission.

Human League released Credo, their first album for Wall of Sound, in 2011. In September of that year, they released the album on vinyl.

To commemorate the 10 year anniversary of the label, album Off the Wall: Ten Years of Wall of Sound was released in 2003.

== Notable artists ==
- Aeroplane
- Grace Jones
- The Human League
- Reverend and The Makers
- Röyksopp
- Scala & Kolacny Brothers

== Notable past projects ==
- Agent Provocateur
- Akasha
- The American Analog Set
- Amp Fiddler
- Artery Jon Carter
- The Bees
- Blak Twang
- Ceasefire
- Cosmo Jarvis
- The Creators
- Diefenbach
- Dirty Beatniks
- DJ Pierre
- Dylan Donkin
- Elektrons
- Etienne De Crecy
- Eugene
- Felix Da Housecat
- Iain Archer
- I Am Kloot
- Infadels
- DJ Touche
- Jon Carter
- Junior Cartier
- Kids On Bridges
- Lisbon Kid
- Little Barrie
- Les Rythmes Digitales (aka Stuart Price)
- Medicine
- Mekon
- Michael Andrews
- Mongrel
- Mogwai
- Mpho Skeef
- Ocelot
- Penguin Prison
- Propellerheads
- Reverend and The Makers
- Rootless
- Shawn Lee
- Shy Child
- Tepr
- The Shortwave Set
- Themroc
- Ugly Duckling
- The Wiseguys
- Tiga
- The Visitor aka Jon Pleased Wimmin
- Zoot Woman

== See also ==
- List of record labels
- List of independent UK record labels
