= Big beat =

Electronic music genre

- Stylistic origins: Electronic; breakbeat hardcore; house; techno; rock; acid house; hip-hop
- Cultural origins: Early 1990s, London, England
- Typical instruments: Keyboards; turntables; synthesizer; guitars; bass; drums; sequencer; sampler
- Derivative forms: Nu skool breaks; New rave

Other topics
- List of big beat artists

Big beat is an electronic music genre that usually uses heavy breakbeats and synthesizer-generated loops and patterns – common to acid house/techno. The term has been used by the British music industry to describe music by artists such as The Prodigy, The Chemical Brothers and Fatboy Slim.

Big beat achieved mainstream success during the 1990s, and achieved its critical and commercial peak between 1995 and 1999, with releases such as the Chemical Brothers’ Dig Your Own Hole, and Fatboy Slim's You've Come a Long Way, Baby, before quickly declining from 2001 onwards.

== Style ==
Big beat features heavy and distorted drum beats at tempos between 100 and 140 beats per minute, Roland TB-303 synthesizer lines resembling those of acid house, and heavy loops from 1960s and 1970s funk, soul, jazz, and rock songs. They are often punctuated with punk-style vocals or rappers and driven by intense, distorted synthesizer basslines with conventional pop, house and techno song structures. Big beat tracks have a sound that includes crescendos, builds, drops, extended drum rolls, and sounds such as spoken word samples, dialogues from film and TV, additional instruments such as Middle Eastern strings or sitars, explosions, air horns, sirens (usually police sirens) and gunshots. As with several other dance genres at the time, the use of effects such as filters, phasing, and flanging was common in the genre.

Celebrated pioneers of the genre such as Fatboy Slim tend to feature heavily compressed loud breakbeats in their songs, which are used to define the music as much as any melodic hooks and sampled sounds. Based on the primary use of loud, heavy breakbeats and basslines, big beat shares attributes with jungle and drum and bass, but has a significantly slower tempo.

== History ==
=== Earlier uses of the term ===
The term "big beat" traces its roots to the Eastern Bloc in the 1960s. Unlike the 1990s genre, it did not cover electronic music; rather, it was used to cover rock and roll and its related genres as the terms were not approved by the authorities in the Eastern Bloc countries (the Soviet Union and its satellite states in the Warsaw Pact). By the 1980s, rock and roll and related terms were already accepted by the authorities, so the term fell into obscurity until its 1990s name revival.

=== Premise (late 1980s) ===
In 1989, Iain Williams from the English electronic duo Big Bang coined the musical term "big beat" to describe the band's musical style. Williams explained the concept during an interview with the journalist Alex Gerry in an article published in the London magazine Metropolitan (issue 132, page 9, 6 June 1989) under the heading, Big Bang in Clubland – Could Big Beat be the 1989 answer to Acid House? The band was promoting their first record, an Arabic-inspired dance version of ABBA's "Voulez-Vous" and their instrumental track "Cold Nights in Cairo" that had just been released on Swanyard Records. The single was produced by Big Bang and Steev Toth. Big Bang are Laurence Malice (Trade nightclub founder) and Iain Williams (writer). The band's sound consisted of various experimental musical elements, including heavy drum beats and synthesizer-generated loops as well as an added suggestion of European influences that at times had a trance-like quality. The band used session vocalists on all their recordings. The concept of the big beat sound was later picked up on and adapted by many club DJs and went on to become widely used by many successful musicians throughout the 1990s.

=== Emerging (early 1990s) ===
The name came from our club, the Big Beat Boutique, which I'm tremendously proud of. I always thought the formula of big beat was the breakbeats of hip-hop, the energy of acid house, and the pop sensibilities of the Beatles, with a little bit of punk sensibility, all rolled into one. People like the Prodigy and the Chemical Brothers – we saw it as very similar to the Beatles and the Rolling Stones, who grew up listening to soul records and blues records and then sold an English version of it back to America.

— Fatboy Slim

In the early 1990s, in the midst of several popular musical subcultures, including the English rave scene, British hip-hop, chillout or ambient, gestating subgenres such as trip hop and breakbeat, along with the emerging Britpop movement – a process of hybridisation and a taste for eclecticism was developing within English dance music generally.

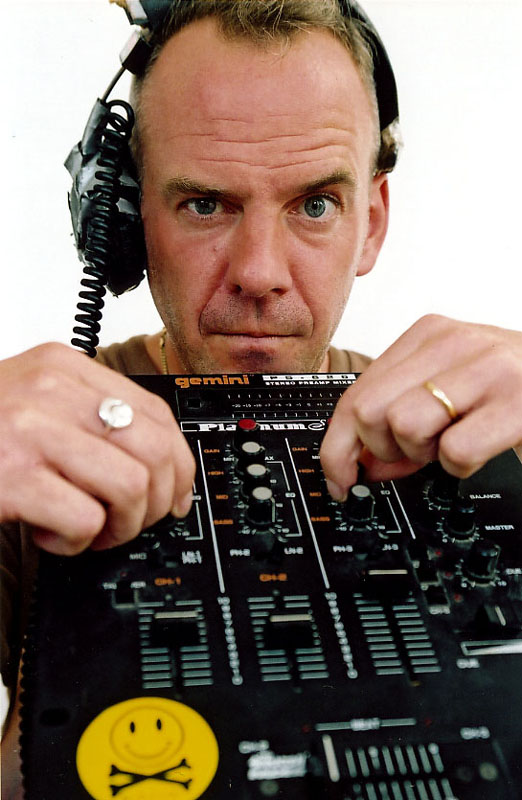
Fatboy Slim in 2004

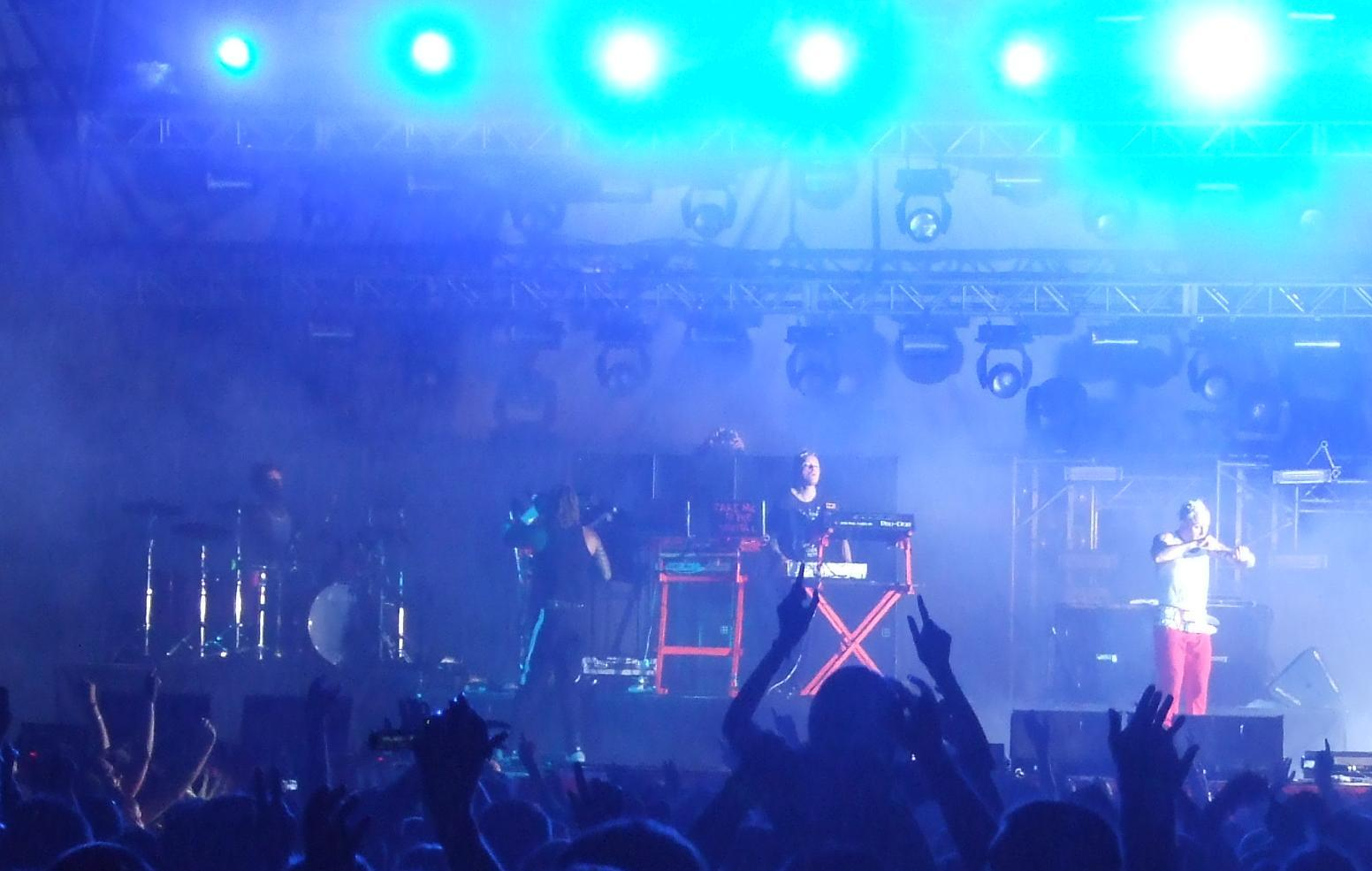
The Prodigy live in 2009

Sampling had become an integral part of dance music production and the fusion of genres appealed to DJs, producers, and fans keen on continued experimentalism within dance music. Record labels such as Junior Boy's Own and Heavenly Records demonstrated this broader-minded approach, releasing slower breakbeat-based music alongside house and acid house singles, introducing DJ-turned-artists such as the Chemical Brothers (known then as the Dust Brothers) and Monkey Mafia in 1994. Norman Cook and Damian Harris first became associated with the term "big beat" through Harris's label Skint Records and club night the Big Beat Boutique, held on Friday nights at Brighton's Concorde club between 1995 and 2001. The Heavenly label's London club The Sunday Social had adopted a similar philosophy with resident DJs the Chemical Brothers and their eclectic approach. The term caught on, and was subsequently applied to a wide variety of acts, including Bentley Rhythm Ace, Lionrock, the Crystal Method, Lunatic Calm, the Lo Fidelity Allstars, Death in Vegas, and the Propellerheads among others.

=== International success (1990s-early 2000s) ===
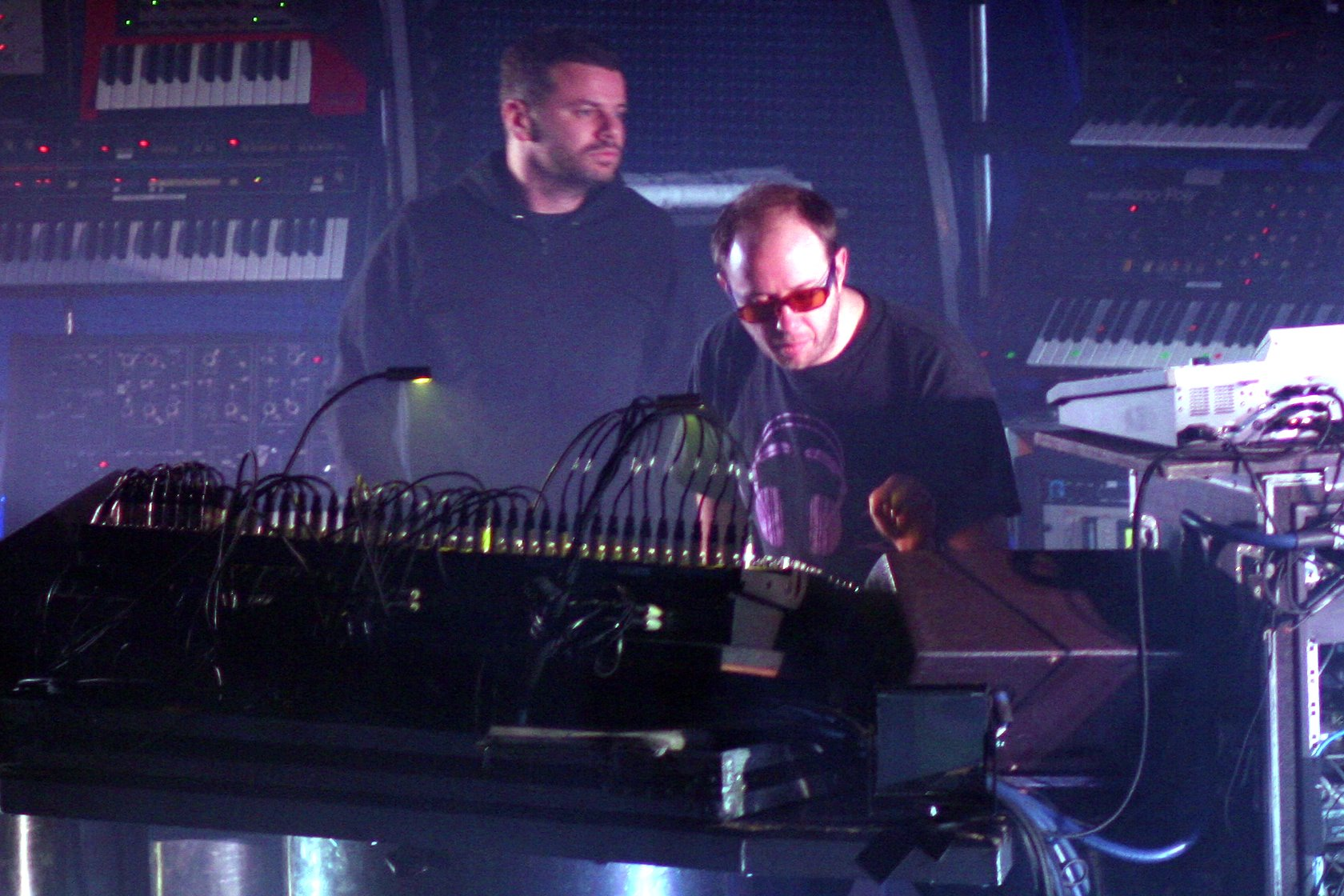
The Chemical Brothers performing in Barcelona, Spain in 2007

Big beat achieved international success in the 1990s and early 2000s, as many artists identified with the genre released hit records. During the 1990s, The Prodigy had several songs in the top ten of the UK Singles Chart with two of those songs reaching number one on the chart. Their album The Fat of the Land went to number one on the Billboard 200 in the US in July 1997 and to number one in many other countries, especially in Europe and Australasia.

The Prodigy performed at the 1997 MTV Video Music Awards winning the Viewer's Choice Award there. The Prodigy's song "Firestarter" went to number 30 on the Billboard Hot 100 and was a number 1 hit in many other countries, including the Czech Republic, Finland, Hungary and Norway. The Prodigy's song "Smack My Bitch Up" went to number 89 on the Billboard Hot 100. The Fat of the Land by the Prodigy sold 2,600,000 copies in the United States and was certified 2× platinum by the Recording Industry Association of America (RIAA). The Prodigy's single "Firestarter" was certified gold by the RIAA.

Fatboy Slim's 1998 album You've Come a Long Way, Baby was certified platinum in September 1999. Fatboy Slim's song "Praise You" peaked at number 36 on the Billboard Hot 100 on May 22, 1999, and his song "The Rockafeller Skank" peaked at number 76 on the Billboard Hot 100 on January 15, 2000. "Praise You" and "The Rockafeller Skank" peaked at number 22 on the Mainstream Top 40 chart in 1999 and number 21 on the Mainstream Top 40 chart in 1999, respectively.

In August 1998, The Crystal Method's song "Comin' Back" reached number one on the Dance Club Songs chart. The Chemical Brothers' 1997 album Dig Your Own Hole was certified gold by the RIAA and sold over 750,000 copies in the United States. The Chemical Brothers' song "Setting Sun" peaked at number 80 on the Billboard Hot 100 in February 1997. Their mainstream success helped Exit Planet Dust (1995) and Surrender (1999) sell 331,000 and 402,000 copies in the U.S., respectively.

Big beat also gained prominence in popular culture through its inclusion in major soundtracks. The platinum-certified soundtrack for The Matrix (1999) featured big beat tracks, selling over 1.4 million copies in the U.S. The genre has also appeared in films such as Lara Croft: Tomb Raider (2001) and in the Wipeout video game series by Psygnosis. The original Wipeout (1995) and its sequels, Wipeout 2097 (released as Wipeout XL in the U.S.) and Wip3out, featured soundtracks with big beat artists such as The Chemical Brothers, The Prodigy, Propellerheads, and Fluke. This collaboration has been recognised as a pioneering example of cultural crossover between gaming and electronic music.

=== Decline (2001–present) ===
The big beat scene had started to gradually decline in popularity by 2001, due to the novelty of the genre's formula fading. The genre's most successful acts would further change their sound; more prominently, the Chemical Brothers releasing more material with direct house and techno characteristics (including "4x4" beats which resemble those of house and synthesizer sweeps and noises, marking a departure from their big beat sound consisting of syncopated breakbeats and hip-hop samples) inspired by the success of the Gatecrasher club and the trance movement, which would reach a commercial peak between 1999 and 2002.
