= The Pillows discography =

- Studio albums: 21
- Extended plays: 4
- Compilation albums: 9
- Singles: 38
- Video albums: 25
- Music videos: 65
- Soundtracks: 5
- VA (Various Artist): 11

This is a discography for the band The Pillows.

== Discography ==
=== Studio albums ===
| Year | Album details | Peak chart positions | |
| Year | Album details | Oricon Weekly | Billboard Japan |
|---|---|---|---|
| 1991 | Moon Gold: Release date: June 21, 1991; Label: Pony Canyon; Format: CD | — | — |
| 1992 | White Incarnation: Release date: May 21, 1992; Label: Pony Canyon; Format: CD | — | — |
| 1994 | Kool Spice: Release date: July 2, 1994; Label: King; Format: CD | — | — |
| 1995 | Living Field: Release date: March 24, 1995; Label: King; Format: CD | — | — |
| 1997 | Please Mr. Lostman: Release date: January 22, 1997; Label: King; Format: CD | 59 | — |
| 1998 | Little Busters: Release date: February 2, 1998; Label: King; Format: CD | 49 | — |
| 1999 | Runners High: Release date: January 22, 1999; Label: King; Format: CD | 35 | — |
| 1999 | Happy Bivouac: Release date: December 2, 1999; Label: King; Format: CD | 72 | — |
| 2001 | Smile: Release date: October 31, 2001; Label: King; Format: CD | 30 | — |
| 2002 | Thank You, My Twilight: Release date: October 23, 2002; Label: King; Format: CD | 45 | — |
| 2003 | Penalty Life: Release date: November 6, 2003; Label: King, Geneon; Format: CD | 39 | — |
| 2004 | Good Dreams: Release date: November 3, 2004; Label: King; Format: CD | 20 | — |
| 2006 | My Foot: Release date: January 12, 2006; Label: King, Geneon; Format: CD | 22 | — |
| 2007 | Wake Up! Wake Up! Wake Up!: Release date: May 2, 2007; Label: Avex Trax; Format: CD | 14 | — |
| 2008 | Pied Piper: Release date: June 25, 2008; Label: Avex Trax; Format: CD | 13 | 13 |
| 2009 | OOPArts: Release date: October 14, 2009; Label: Avex Trax; Format: CD | 7 | 10 |
| 2011 | Horn Again: Release date: January 26, 2011; Label: Avex Trax; Format: CD | 8 | 8 |
| 2012 | Trial: Release date: January 18, 2012; Label: Avex Trax; Format: CD | 9 | 8 |
| 2014 | Moondust: Release date: October 22, 2014; Label: Avex Trax; Format: CD | 5 | 5 |
| 2016 | Stroll and Roll: Release date: April 6, 2016; Label: Delicious Label, King; Format: CD | 8 | 9 |
| 2017 | Nook in the Brain: Release date: March 8, 2017; Label: Delicious Label; Format: CD | 11 | 17 |
| 2018 | Rebroadcast: Release date: September 19, 2018; Label: Delicious Label; Format: CD | - | - |

=== Extended plays ===
| Year | Extended play details | Peak chart positions | |
| Year | Extended play details | Oricon Weekly | Billboard Japan |
|---|---|---|---|
| 1990 | Pantomime: Release date: May 21, 1990; Label: Captain | — | — |
| 1990 | 90's My Life: Release date: October 25, 1990; Label: Captain | — | — |
| 1993 | The Pillows Presents Special CD: Release date: October 18, 1993; Label: Bad Music | — | — |
| 2004 | Turn Back: Release date: June 23, 2004; Label: King | 56 | — |

=== Compilations ===
| Year | Album details | Peak chart positions | |
| Year | Album details | Oricon Weekly | Billboard Japan |
|---|---|---|---|
| 2001 | Fool on the Planet: Release date: February 7, 2001; Label: King; Format: CD | 19 | — |
| 2002 | Another Morning, Another Pillows: Release date: October 23, 2002; Label: King; Format: CD | 59 | — |
| 2004 | 90's My Life Returns: Release date: March 8, 2004; Label: AAD | — | — |
| 2007 | Lostman Go to Yesterday: Release date: November 14, 2007; Label: King; Format: CD, Box set | 29 | — |
| 2009 | Rock Stock & Too Smoking the Pillows: Release date: June 3, 2009; Label: Avex Trax; Format: CD | 7 | 7 |
| 2009 | Once Upon a Time in the Pillows: Release date: June 3, 2009; Label: King; Format: CD | 14 | 12 |
| 2014 | Bootleg the Pillows 1992-1993: Release date: October 4, 2014; Label: Delicious Label; Format: CD | — | — |
| 2016 | Across the Metropolis: Release date: March 2, 2016; Label: Avex Trax; Format: CD | 22 | 29 |
| 2025 | Before Going to Bed (Best of the Delicious Period): Release date: July 30, 2025; Label: Delicious Label; Format: CD | — | — |

=== Singles ===
| Year | Title | Chart peaks | | Album | Format |
| Year | Title | Oricon | Japan Hot 100 | Album | Format |
|---|---|---|---|---|---|
| 1991 | "Ame ni Utaeba" | — | — | Moon Gold | Mini CD |
| 1992 | "Kanojo wa Shisuta" | — | — | White Incarnation | Mini CD |
| 1994 | "Daydream Wonder" | — | — | Living Field | Mini CD |
| 1995 | "Girlfriend" | 99 | — | Living Field | Mini CD |
| 1996 | "Tiny Boat" | — | — | Non-album single | Mini CD |
| 1996 | "Strange Chameleon" | — | — | Please Mr. Lostman | CD |
| 1996 | "Swanky Street" | — | — | Please Mr. Lostman | CD |
| 1996 | "Trip Dancer" | — | — | Please Mr. Lostman | Mini CD |
| 1997 | "Kanojo wa Kyou" | — | — | Please Mr. Lostman | Mini CD |
| 1997 | "One Life" | — | — | Little Busters | CD |
| 1997 | "Hybrid Rainbow" | — | — | Little Busters | Mini CD |
| 1998 | "Another Morning" | — | — | Little Busters | Mini CD |
| 1998 | "No Self Control" | 87 | — | Runners High | CD |
| 1998 | "Instant Music" | — | — | Runners High | Mini CD |
| 1999 | "Carnival" | 67 | — | Happy Bivouac | CD |
| 1999 | "Rush" | 81 | — | Happy Bivouac | CD |
| 2000 | "Ride on Shooting Star" | 54 | — | FLCL No.1: Addict | CD |
| 2000 | "I Think I Can" | 69 | — | FLCL No.2: King of Pirates | CD |
| 2002 | "White Summer and Green Bicycle, Red Hair with Black Guitar" | 56 | — | Thank You, My Twilight | CD |
| 2003 | "Terminal Heaven's Rock" | 44 | — | Penalty Life | CD |
| 2004 | "Sono Mirai wa Ima" | 26 | — | Good Dreams | CD |
| 2005 | "Non Fiction" | 24 | — | My Foot | CD |
| 2005 | "The Third Eye" | 29 | — | My Foot | CD |
| 2006 | "Gazelle City" | — | — | My Foot | CD |
| 2007 | "Scarecrow" | 13 | — | Wake Up! Wake Up! Wake Up! | CD |
| 2007 | "Ladybird Girl" | 15 | — | Pied Piper | CD |
| 2008 | "Tokyo Bambi" | 9 | 25 | Pied Piper | CD |
| 2008 | "New Animal" | 10 | 17 | Pied Piper | CD |
| 2009 | "Ameagari ni mita Maboroshi" | 7 | 4 | OOPArts | CD |
| 2010 | "Rodeo Star Mate" | 12 | 8 | Non-album single | CD |
| 2010 | "Movement" | 18 | 17 | Horn Again | CD |
| 2011 | "Tabasco Disco" | — | — | Non-album single | CD |
| 2011 | "Comic Sonic" | 19 | 22 | Trial | CD |
| 2011 | "Energiya" | 21 | 20 | Trial | CD |
| 2013 | "Happy Birthday" | 18 | 24 | Moondust | CD |
| 2014 | "Future" | — | — | Non-album single | CD |
| 2014 | "About a Rock 'n' Roll Band" | 18 | 48 | Moondust | CD |
| 2016 | "Cuckoo no Su no Shita de" | — | — | Stroll and Roll | Digital |
| 2016 | "Cuckoo no Su no Shita de" | — | — | Stroll and Roll | CD |
| 2016 | "Ousama ni Nare" | — | — | Nook in the Brain | Digital |
| 2017 | "The World There Is Nowhere" | — | — | Non-album single | CD |
| 2017 | "Boku no Tomodachi" | — | — | Rebroadcast | CD |
| 2019 | "Happy Go Ducky!" | 15 | — | Non-album single | CD |
| 2024 | "Blank" | — | — | Non-album single | |

==== Promotional singles ====
| Year | Title | Chart peaks | Album |
| Year | Title | Japan Hot 100 | Album |
|---|---|---|---|
| 2009 | "Funny Bunny" (Rock Stock Version) | 34 | Rock Stock & Too Smoking the Pillows |
| 2009 | "Your Order" | 31 | OOPArts |
| 2009 | "Lightning Runaway" | — | No Music, No Life Songs |
| 2011 | "Doggie Howl" | 65 | Horn Again |
| 2012 | "Trial" | 23 | Trial |

=== Soundtracks ===
- Love & Pop (various artists, 1998)
- FLCL No. 1: Addict (with Shinkichi Mitsumune) (2004)
- FLCL No. 2: King of Pirates (2004)
- Colors of Life (various artists, 2004)
- Moonlight Jellyfish (various artists, 2004)
- FLCL No. 3 (2005)
- FooL on CooL generation (2018)
- Ousama Ni Nare (2019)

=== Compilations (with or by other artists) ===
- Respectable Roosters (1999)
- Life Is Delicious (2001)
- Beat Offenders (2002)
- Synchronized Rockers (シンクロナイズド・ロッカーズ, tribute album, 2004)
- 802 Heavy Rotations J-Hits Complete '94-'96 (2004)
- Wasurerarenai Koi no Uta (2005)
- The Collectors - 20th Anniversary Special Album (2006)
- Electric Rays (2008)
- Lightning Runaway (2009)
- ROCK AND SYMPATHY (tribute album, 2014)
- Yes, We Love Butchers: Mumps (2014)

== Videography ==
=== Video albums ===
| Year | Album details | Peak chart positions |
| Year | Album details | Oricon Weekly |
|---|---|---|
| 1998 | Hello, Welcome to Bubbletown's Happy Zoo (Instant Show): Release date: January 21, 1998; Label: King; Format: VHS, DVD | 95 |
| 1999 | We Have a Theme Song: Release date: February 26, 1999; Label: King; Format: VHS, DVD | 83 |
| 2001 | Busters on the Planet: Release date: August 29, 2001; Label: King; Format: VHS, DVD | — |
| 2003 | Dead Stock Paradise: Release date: September 3, 2003; Label: King; Format: DVD | 48 |
| 2004 | Walkin' on the Spiral: Release date: September 16, 2004; Label: King; Format: DVD | 37 |
| 2005 | 916: Release date: January 26, 2005; Label: King; Format: DVD | 52 |
| 2005 | Delicious Bump Tour in USA (with Noodles): Release date: September 14, 2005; Label: King; Format: DVD | 31 |
| 2006 | Delicious Bump Show!! (with various artists): Release date: February 26, 2006; Label: Delicious Label; Format: DVD | — |
| 2007 | Lostman Go to America: Release date: November 14, 2007; Label: Avex Trax; Format: DVD, BD | 22 |
| 2008 | Wake up! Stand up! and Go!: Release date: January 30, 2008; Label: Avex Trax; Format: DVD, BD | 20 |
| 2009 | Pied Piper Go to Yesterday: Release date: January 28, 2009; Label: Avex Trax; Format: DVD, BD | 36 |
| 2009 | Blue Song with Blue Poppies: Release date: May 20, 2009; Label: Avex Trax; Format: DVD, BD | 15 |
| 2010 | Lostman Go to Budokan: Release date: January 20, 2010; Label: Avex Trax; Format: DVD, BD | 10 |
| 2010 | Parts of OOPArts: Release date: June 23, 2010; Label: Avex Trax; Format: DVD, BD | 26 |
| 2011 | Born in the 60's (with various artists): Release date: February 16, 2011; Label: Avex Trax; Format: DVD | 12 |
| 2011 | Born Again: Release date: October 12, 2011; Label: Avex Trax; Format: DVD, BD | 6 |
| 2012 | We are Friends (with Noodles & All Ages): Release date: January 18, 2012; Label: Avex Trax; Format: DVD | 16 |
| 2012 | The Pillows Presents Born in the 60's (with various artists): Release date: April 11, 2012; Label: Avex Trax; Format: DVD | 24 |
| 2012 | Real Trial: Release date: November 14, 2012; Label: Avex Trax; Format: DVD, BD | 11 |
| 2014 | Revival of Motion Pictures: Release date: March 12, 2014; Label: Avex Trax; Format: DVD, BD | 20 |
| 2014 | Our Black Flag: Release date: March 12, 2014; Label: Avex Trax; Format: BD | 39 |
| 2014 | Do You Remember the 2nd Movement?: Release date: September 17, 2014; Label: Avex Trax; Format: DVD, BD | 18 |
| 2015 | Don't Forget Today!: Release date: January 21, 2015; Label: Avex Trax; Format: DVD, BD | 30 |
| 2015 | Moondust Light for You: Release date: August 26, 2015; Label: Avex Trax; Format: DVD, BD | 57 |
| 2016 | Stroll and Roll Band: Release date: November 23, 2016; Label: Delicious Label; Format: DVD, BD | 47 |
