= Hello, Welcome to Bubbletown's Happy Zoo =

Hello, Welcome to Bubbletown's Happy Zoo (instant show)

Video by The Pillows
- Released: January 21, 1998
- Recorded: Liquid Room on December 21, 1997.
- Genre: Alternative rock
- Label: King Records

The Pillows chronology
Hello, Welcome to Bubbletown's Happy Zoo (instant show) (1998)	We Have A Theme Song (1999)

Hello, Welcome to Bubbletown's Happy Zoo is a live performance video by The Pillows, released onto VHS and DVD. As well as featuring a live performance, it includes commentary by The Pillows in between songs and the music video for their single "Hybrid Rainbow". This is the first video officially released by the Pillows.

== Track listing ==
1. "Like a Lovesong (Back to Back)"
2. "One Life"
3. "Stalker"
4. "Strange Chameleon"
5. "Swanky Street"
6. "I Want to Be Sullivan"
7. "Little Busters"
8. "Hybrid Rainbow" (music video)
