= White Summer and Green Bicycle, Red Hair with Black Guitar. =

Single by The Pillows

from the album Thank You, My Twilight
- B-side: "I Want to Live Like That"
- Released: August 1, 2002
- Recorded: Aobadai Studio
- Genre: Alternative rock
- Length: 5:50 (original egotistic version); 4:06 (display version)
- Label: King KICM-1054
- Songwriter: Sawao Yamanaka
- Producer: Zin Yoshida

The Pillows singles chronology
"I Think I Can" (2000)	"White Summer and Green Bicycle, Red Hair with Black Guitar." (2002)	"Terminal Heaven's Rock" (2003)

Audio sample
- White Summer and Green Bicycle, Red Hair with Black Guitar.: file; help

"White Summer and Green Bicycle, Red Hair with Black Guitar."^{[a]} is a song and single by the Japanese, alternative rock band The Pillows. Neither the single nor Thank You, My Twilight (the album it appears on) were released outside Japan. The album was produced by Zin Yoshida of Salon Music.

== Development ==
"White Summer and Green Bicycle, Red Hair with Black Guitar." is based on Sawao Yamanaka's lonely adolescence growing up in Hokkaidō. This viewpoint is most clearly reflected in the third verse.

I've long been accustomed
To the loneliness
I don't really feel sorrow
These tears are only a pretense

Despite this, Yamanaka has stated that he wrote "White Summer" for the group and not as a personal song for himself, saying, "I just make music for life."

Out of about four songs from the demo album The Pillows was working on at the time,^{[b]} "Babylon Verses of Angel" was Yamanaka's choice for the single release. However, the director, producer, and others pushed for "White Summer". Since the original version has a minute and a half intro, it had to be cut down for its single release. It was for this reason that Yamanaka was initially opposed to "White Summer" as a single, as "Babylon Verses of Angel" would not have required editing.

== Music video ==
Screenshot of the music video for "White Summer" showing a young boy riding the green bicycle of the song's title.

The music video for "White Summer and Green Bicycle, Red Hair with Black Guitar. (display version)" features a comet-tailed goldfish−the same featured on the single's cover−swimming around in a kitchen and bedroom, later also swimming around the band as they play against a white background. Short clips of a young boy riding a green bicycle are also shown at times, though no person with red hair, nor any black guitars are featured in the music video.

== Versions and releases ==
The 4:06 "display version" of "White Summer" was first released in the maxi single format and is the version that appears in the DVD Dead Stock Paradise and compilation album Lostman Go to Yesterday. The 5:50 "original egotistic version" is featured in the 2002 album Thank You, My Twilight. Another version known as the "FooL on CooL version" was recorded for FLCL and featured in the 2018 album FooL on CooL generation.

== Notes and references ==
a: The song is also given the alternate, Japanese title of "Shiroi Natsu to Midori no Jitensha Akai Kami to Kuroi Guitar" (白い夏と緑の自転車 赤い髪と黒いギター). However, the English title is what appears on the single's cover.
b: While not explicitly stated, it would seem that the demo album would become Thank You, My Twilight and the four songs being considered for release as a single were "Babylon Verses of Angel"; Thank You, My Twilight"; "Rain Brain"; and "White Summer and Green Bicycle, Red Hair with Black Guitar."
