= Fool on the Planet =

Greatest hits album by The Pillows
- Released: February 7, 2001
- Genre: Alternative rock
- Length: 1:09:26
- Label: King Records; KICS-850

The Pillows chronology
Happy Bivouac (1999)	Fool on the Planet (2001)	Smile (2001)

Fool on the Planet is a greatest hits album released by The Pillows on February 7, 2001. It features two new songs, "Fool on the Planet" and the hidden track "Secret Slogan".

== Track listing ==
All tracks are written by Sawao Yamanaka.

No.	Title	Original release	Length
1.	"Fool on the planet"	New recording	6:04
2.	"Swanky Street"	1997 ~ Please Mr.Lostman	5:01
3.	"I think I can"	2000 ~ I think I can	3:00
4.	"インスタント ミュージック (Instant Music)"	1999 ~ RUNNERS HIGH	3:17
5.	"TRIP DANCER"	1997 ~ Please Mr.Lostman	3:56
6.	"ONE LIFE"	1998 ~ LITTLE BUSTERS	4:05
7.	"屋上に昇って (Okujou ni Nobotte)"	1995 ~ Living Field	3:21
8.	"Midnight Down"	1999 ~ RUNNERS HIGH	3:25
9.	"カーニバル (Carnival)"	1999 ~ HAPPY BIVOUAC	3:50
10.	"確かめに行こう (Tashikame ni Yukou)"	1999 ~ RUNNERS HIGH	5:09
11.	"LITTLE BUSTERS"	1998 ~ LITTLE BUSTERS	3:44
12.	"Ride on shooting star"	2000 ~ Ride on shooting star	2:22
13.	"NAKED SHUFFLE"	1994 ~ KOOL SPICE	3:49
14.	"Funny Bunny"	1999 ~ HAPPY BIVOUAC	3:39
15.	"ストレンジ カメレオン (Strange Chameleon)"	1997 ~ Please Mr.Lostman	6:33
16.	"ハイブリッド レインボウ (Hybrid Rainbow)"	1998 ~ LITTLE BUSTERS	4:01
17.	"Secret Slogan"	New recording	4:20
Total length:			1:09:26
