= Penalty Life =

Studio album by The Pillows
- Released: November 6, 2003 (Japan); May 3, 2005 (United States)
- Recorded: Bazooka Studio; Polar Bear Studio
- Genre: Alternative rock
- Length: 46:28
- Label: King Records (JP); KICS-1039; Geneon (US)
- Producer: Zin Yoshida

The Pillows chronology
Another Morning, Another Pillows (2002)	Penalty Life (2003)	Turn Back (2004)

Singles from Penalty Life
- 1. "Terminal Heaven's Rock" Released: September 3, 2003

Professional ratings
Review scores
Source	Rating
Allmusic	link

Penalty Life (ペナルティーライフ) is an album released by The Pillows on November 6, 2003. It is the first album to be also released in America. The album was produced by Zin Yoshida of Salon Music.

== Track listing ==
All songs by Sawao Yamanaka.

1. "Dead Stock Paradise" – 2:31
2. "Lonesome Diamond" (ロンサムダイヤモンド) – 4:27
3. "Freebee Honey" – 3:34
4. "Terminal Heaven's Rock" (ターミナル・ヘヴンズ・ロック) – 4:21
5. "The Sun that Will not Rise" (昇らない太陽) – 6:17
6. "Phantom Pain" (ファントムペイン) – 3:56
7. "I Know You" – 3:26
8. "Moon Marguerite" (ムーンマーガレット) – 3:59
9. "Super Trampoline School Kid" (スーパートランポリン スクールキッド) – 2:14
10. "Mole Town Prisoner" (モールタウン プリズナー) – 2:17
11. "The Scar Whispers, Nobody is in Paradise" (傷跡の囁き 誰もいないパラダイス) – 9:26
12. "I'm Broken Piece" (ぼくは かけら, hidden track)
