= Kenji Ueda =

Japanese rock musician and producer

Ueda Kenji
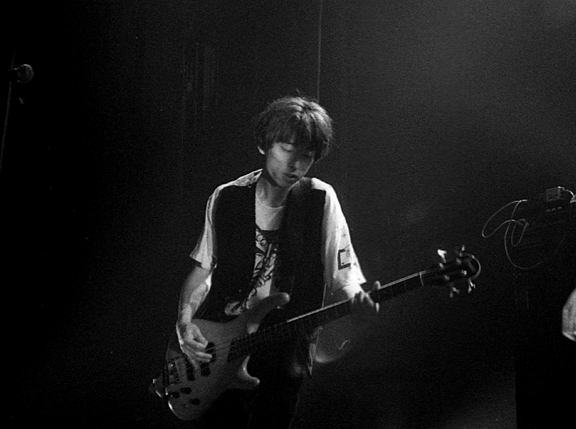
- Ueda in 1989

Background information
- Born: August 30, 1965 (age 60)
- Genres: Rock, alternative rock, punk rock
- Occupation: Musician/Producer
- Instrument: Bass
- Formerly of: The Pillows, Kenzi & The Trips
- Website: http://ueken.uccello.jp/index.html

Kenji Ueda (上田ケンジ Ueda Kenji, nickname ウエケン UEKEN) is a Japanese rock musician and producer. He is known for his solo work, as well as his work with Kenzi & the Trips and the Pillows.

== Biography ==
=== Early life and influences ===
Born August 30, 1965 in Sapporo, Ueda began playing acoustic guitar at age 9. Seeing a television appearance by Kiss inspired him to take up the electric guitar. He also cites influential punk bands such as the Sex Pistols, the Star Club, ARB, Anarchy and the Roosters as early influences.

In 1983, Ueda quit high school at age 18, and went to Tokyo by invitation of Kenzi who was a senior at the school. Ueda joined the punk band Kenzi & the Trips, in which Kenzi acted as the lead vocalist and bassist. This band subsequently disbanded. The other member of the newly formed band was Shinichirou Sato, who would later go on to form the pillows with Ueda.

=== The Pillows ===
In 1989, Ueda left Kenzi & The Trips. Immediately after that, Ueda invited Sawao Yamanaka of the Coinlocker Babies, and formed the Pillows on September 16. The lineup was Ueda (bass guitar and leader of the band), Sawao Yamanaka (rhythm guitar and vocals), Yoshiaki Manabe (lead guitar), and Shinichirou Sato (drums). He and Yamanaka were the main songwriters. They released their first official album Moon Gold under the Pony Canyon record label in 1991 and also released their second album White Incarnation under the same label in 1992, but, in the same year, Ueda left the Pillows owing to discord with other members and difference in musicality. The Pillows did not release another album until 1994. Ueda has since been replaced by bassists Tatsuya Kashima, Jun Suzuki, and Yoshinori Arie. Both Kashima and Suzuki have been called “support members” rather than permanent replacements out of "respect for the original line-up".

=== Solo career ===
Ueda participated in various musicians' recording as a session bassist after leaving the Pillows. On the other hand, he began to provide other singers with his songs, or to produce them.

Ueda started john? label in 1999 and has also worked as a producer with the record label, producing work from artists such as Going Under Ground. He also sponsored the tamtom label from 2002.

In 2000, Ueda released his first solo album Forever Love (フォーエバーラブ) under Bumblebee Records. He has gone on to release two more major albums with the Bumblebee label: Ambivalence (2002) and Ao (青, Blue) (2006).

== Discography ==
Title	Label	Year
フォーエバーラブ (Forever Love)	Bumblebee	2000
君はライダー／窓辺	Bumblebee	2001
ナイトメア／日々、君、恋し	Bumblebee	2002
灰色フランネルの森 監修 上田ケンジ	Tamtom	2002
Ambivalence	Bumblebee	2002
青	Bumblebee	2006
