= Moonlight Mile (manga) =

Japanese manga series

- First tankōbon volume cover
- Genre: Science fiction
- Manga
- Written by: Yasuo Ohtagaki
- Published by: Shogakukan
- Magazine: Big Comic Superior; Pixiv
- Original run: December 7, 2000 – present
- Volumes: 24
- Anime television series
- Directed by: Iku Suzuki
- Produced by: Tsuneo Takechi; Kenta Takiguchi; Kazuo Shimizu; Tokuji Hasegawa; Takayoshi Takeuchi
- Written by: Akinori Endō
- Music by: Kan Sawada
- Studio: Studio Hibari
- Licensed by: NA: Funimation
- Original network: Wowow
- Original run: February 4, 2007 – December 13, 2007
- Episodes: 26
- icon

Moonlight Mile (stylized in all caps) is a Japanese manga series written and illustrated by Yasuo Ohtagaki. It was serialized in Shogakukan's seinen manga magazine Big Comic Superior from December 2000 to November 2011, when the manga entered a ten-year hiatus. It resumed publication on Pixiv in December 2021. A 26-episode anime television series by Studio Hibari was broadcast on Wowow for two seasons in 2007.

The story follows a pair of mountain climbers who decide to become astronauts. Yasuo Ohtagaki says, in the preview special of the anime, that his goal in writing the story was to create a realistic space drama that features the political elements involved in modern space missions. Ken Noguchi, a professional mountain climber, provided inspiration to the creators of Moonlight Mile for their depictions of ascending Mount Everest.

== Plot ==
Gorou Saruwatari and Jack "Lostman" Woodbridge are mountain climbers who have ascended some of the highest mountains around the world. At the peak of Mount Everest, they see the International Space Station in the sky above and become determined to go into space. At the same time, the International Space Association (ISA) begins the "Nexus" program to research and obtain a new energy source (Helium-3) which has been discovered on the Moon. Gorou and Lostman attempt to join the program through different approaches: Lostman becomes a military pilot and Gorou takes a job as a construction worker.

=== Characters ===
- Jack F. Woodbridge, a.k.a. "Lostman" (Voiced by: Hiroaki Hirata (Japanese); John Gremillion (English))
- Gorou Saruwatari (Voiced by: Kazuhiko Inoue (Japanese); Andrew Love (English))
- Kousuke Sawamura (Voiced by: Hiroki Takahashi (Japanese); Jessie James Grelle (English))
- Steve O'Brien (Voiced by: Kinryū Arimoto (Japanese); Charles C. Campbell (English))
- Miguel (Voiced by: Masahito Yabe)
- Riyoko Ikeuchi (Voiced by: Rie Tanaka (Japanese); Monica Rial (English))
- Maggy Hiraoka (Voiced by: Tomoko Kawakami)
- Akemi Saruwatari (Voiced by: Yuki Makishima (Japanese); Kira Vincent-Davis (English))

== Media ==
=== Manga ===
Written and illustrated by Yasuo Ohtagaki, Moonlight Mile started in Shogakukan's seinen manga magazine Big Comic Superior on December 7, 2000. The series' first part finished in October 2007; the second part started in December of the same year. The second part finished in November 2011 and the manga entered on hiatus, when it was announced that Ohtagaki would start a new series, Mobile Suit Gundam Thunderbolt. Shogakukan collected its chapters into individual tankōbon volumes. The first volume was released on May 30, 2001. The 23rd and last volume published by Shogakukan was released on January 30, 2012. Shogakukan re-released the first part in a five-volume edition, which collected three original tankōbon volumes in one, from October 30, 2012, to July 30, 2013.

In May 2021, Ohtagaki announced that the manga would resume publication; the series resumed with its third part on the Pixiv website on December 25 of the same year. The 24th volume was published as an ebook by Number Nine on December 23, 2022. In February 2026, Ohtagaki announced that the series would resume with individuals chapters available for purchase in ebook stores starting on April 24 and that the 24th volume will be re-released in a new full-color edition, stating as well that it will be released in print the same year.

=== Anime ===
An anime television series adaptation by Studio Hibari was broadcast on Wowow in 2007; the first season, Lift off, was broadcast for twelve episodes from February 4 to May 26; the second season, Touch down, was broadcast for fourteen episodes from September 13 to December 13, 2007. The main opening theme was composed by Kan Sawada, while the Pillows performed the ending themes "Scarecrow" and "Boat House" for the first and second season, respectively.

ADV Films announced that they had acquired the series in July 2007. The series' first season was released on home video on three DVDs from March 3 to May 20, 2008. In July 2008, the anime became one of over 30 ADV titles transferred to Funimation. The entire first season was released on box set on April 21, 2009.

==== Season 1 ====
No.	Title	Original release date
1	"To Beyond the Sky" "Sora no mukou he" (宇宙の向こうへ)	February 4, 2007
Gorou and Lostman are inspired to become astronauts after seeing the International Space Station from the peak of Mount Everest. They set out in different ways to achieve that goal.
2	"Neverending Dream" "Hatenaki yume" (果てなき夢)	March 11, 2007
Gorou's skills as a construction worker are tested as he has to rescue another worker who is trapped without causing the building to collapse.
3	"Last Swing" "Rasuto suingu" (ラストスイング)	March 18, 2007
In the United States, Gorou meets with his friend Chris Jefferson, who launches into space to evaluate orbital construction equipment.
4	"Desert's Oath" "Sabaku no chikai" (砂漠の誓い)	March 25, 2007
On a US military mission to Iraq, Lostman's plane is shot down. After leaving captivity, he befriends a local father and son named Achmed and Malik, respectively.
5	"From the City of Stars" "Hoshi no machi kara" (星の街から)	April 1, 2007
After development problems with the Japanese H-3 rocket, Gorou goes to Russia to fly on the Gagarin space shuttle, which also needs more reliability but is closer to completion.
6	"Gamblers" "Gyanburāzu" (ギャンブラーズ)	April 8, 2007
Gorou arrives at the International Space Station and helps construct the Horner cargo vessel that travels between the Earth and the Moon.
7	"Reunion" "Saikai" (再会)	April 15, 2007
Lostman launches on the American Space Shuttle Odyssey to meet up with Gorou on the ISS. However, the shuttle is temporarily diverted to a secret military space station.
8	"Returning Alive from Orbit" "Kidō kara no Seikan" (軌道からの生還)	April 22, 2007
The German spacecraft Doner Kebab and its pilot, Carl Vilsmeier, have to be rescued before the vessel is expected to re-enter and hit Sydney, Australia.
9	"Moon Walker" "Mūn Uōkā" (ムーンウォーカー)	April 29, 2007
Gorou tests the Japanese Moon Walker mecha underwater, but there is an accident that ends up crushing and killing a diver.
10	"Current of Doubt" "Giwaku no Chōryū" (疑惑の潮流)	May 13, 2007
The Moon Walker accident is investigated to discover who is truly responsible.
11	"The Data Which is Altered" "Kaizan sa reta Dēta" (改竄されたデータ)	May 20, 2007
A corruption scandal is exposed regarding the Moon Walker's development.
12	"Star Fighter" "Sutā Faitā" (スターファイター)	May 27, 2007
Lostman travels in the top-secret X-68 Nightmare from Area 51 to test a fighter spacecraft at the military space station Enterprise.

==== Season 2 ====
No.	Title	Original release date
1	"Moving Out to Space" "Ugokidashita Uchuu" (動き出した宇宙)	September 13, 2007
As the crewed cislunar transport Galileo is being built, Lostman performs a combat exercise with five other X-77 Star Fighters.
2	"Memories of the Viola" "Omoide no Viola" (思い出のヴィオラ)	September 20, 2007
Two Italians, Paulo and his adopted son Miguel, visit the ISS on the Space Shuttle Vanguard.
3	"A Hero's Return" "Eiyuu no Kikan" (英雄の帰還)	September 27, 2007
During the construction of Galileo, a large solar panel comes loose and has to be retrieved, leading to the discovery of a lost cosmonaut who was going to land on the Moon in June 1969.
4	"Cold War Resumes" "Reisen Futatabi" (冷戦再び)	October 4, 2007
The Chinese government launches a crewed anti-satellite weapon, and Lostman is sent on a secret mission to destroy it. The life of Gorou's family is also seen.
5	"Dogfight" "Doggufaito" (ドッグファイト)	October 11, 2007
The American Star Fighters attack the Chinese combat ship Yǎolóng (咬龍). Both sides end up damaged.
6	"Rocket Boys" "Roketto Bōizu" (ロケットボーイズ)	October 18, 2007
Malik builds model rockets in the US and faces anti-Arab racism and stereotyping.
7	"Twelve Pioneers" "Juuninen Kaitakusha" (12人の開拓者)	October 25, 2007
The crew of the first lunar expedition, including Gorou, is announced, and launches on the next-generation space shuttle Orion. Lostman prepares to go to the Moon.
8	"Orion's Shield" "Orion no Tate" (オリオンの盾)	November 1, 2007
Orion docks to Galileo, but a large solar storm threatens the crew in low Earth orbit.
9	"Maggy's SHOW" "Magī's SHOW" (マギー'S SHOW)	November 8, 2007
The idol journalist Maggy Hiraoka visits the ISS, where she notices a suspicious military robot, and Galileo, before it leaves for the Moon.
10	"Crisis" "Kuraishizu" (クライシス)	November 15, 2007
A debris strike during a spacewalk puts Maggy in danger. After being rescued, a large debris field hits the ISS.
11	"Guardian of the Sky" "Tenkuu no Shougosha" (天空の守護者)	November 22, 2007
Maggy controls the secret X-0 Guardian robot via a neural interface to rescue the ISS crew. The ISS and Orion are damaged, so all survivors on board go to the Moon together on Galileo.
12	"Moon Base" "Mūn Bēsu" (ムーンベース)	November 29, 2007
Galileo releases the Copernicus lander which arrives at the Moon on May 11, 2015. The crew uses containers from the Horner to assemble a lunar base.
13	"Tears of the Moon" "Tsuki no Namida" (月の涙)	December 6, 2007
The second lunar expedition team travels to the Moon on the Horner. Gorou is informed of his mother's death.
14	"My Sweet Home" "Mai・Suīto・Hōmu" (マイ・スイート・ホーム)	December 13, 2007
As the lunar base continues to develop, Gorou pays respects to his mother. Fatima, one of the civilian crew, becomes stranded and accidentally discovers American military activity on the far side of the Moon.

== Reception ==
The anime's first season was reviewed for THEM Anime Reviews, with the reviewer awarding it 4 out of 5 stars, praising CGI, while noting that it is a rather slow development for the main plot. The first DVD volume was reviewed for Anime News Network, where it received a score of B−, writing that it is "a celebration of the traditional reification of manly-man astronauts shackled to drama cheesy enough to attract space-rats".

The entry in The Encyclopedia of Science Fiction notes that the despite or perhaps because of its uniqueness (an adult-targeted, hard SF space series), the show never achieved mainstream popularity, and that "Moonlight Mile [...] stands as a bold, if imperfect (and somewhat forgotten), exploration of humanity's next giant leap, one that wears its influences on its sleeve […] while carving out a distinctively edgy take on the space conquest theme."
