= Another Morning =

Another Morning may refer to:

- "Another Morning" (The Pillows song)
- "Another Morning" (The Moody Blues song), 1967
