= Thank You, My Twilight =

Studio album by The Pillows
- Released: October 23, 2002
- Recorded: Bazooka Studio
- Genre: Neo-prog; alt-rock
- Length: 40:17
- Label: King Records; KICS-976

The Pillows chronology
Smile (2001)	Thank You, My Twilight (2002)	Another Morning, Another Pillows (2002)

Singles from Thank You, My Twilight
- 1. "White Summer and Green Bicycle, Red Hair with Black Guitar" Released: August 1, 2002

Thank You, My Twilight is an album released by The Pillows on October 23, 2002. The song "Biscuit Hammer" contains a reference to The Great Dictator, Charlie Chaplin's first film to employ spoken dialog. The titular song is featured in several episodes of FLCL Progressive and FLCL Alternative.

== Track listing ==
1. "Rain Brain"
2. "Biscuit Hammer" (ビスケットハンマー BISUKETTO HANMA)
3. "Poem of Babylon Angel" (バビロン 天使の詩 BABIRON Tenshi no Uta)
4. "My Beautiful Sun (Irene)"
5. "Come on, Ghost"
6. "Robotman"
7. "Ritalin 202"
8. "White Summer and Green Bicycle, Red Hair with Black Guitar." (白い夏と緑の自転車 赤い髪と黒いギター, Shiroi Natsu to Midori no Jitensha Akai Kami to Kuroi GITAA)
9. "Winona" (ウィノナ WINONA)
10. "Thank You, My Twilight"
11. "Rookie Jet"
