= Girlfriend (The Pillows song) =

Single by The Pillows

from the album Living Field
- Released: March 24, 1995
- Genre: Alternative rock
- Label: King Records; KIDS-223

The Pillows singles chronology
"Daydream Wonder" (1994)	"Girlfriend" (1995)	"Tiny Boat" (1996)

"Girlfriend" (ガールフレンド, Gārufurendo) is the fourth single by The Pillows. It was released as an 8cm CD on March 24, 1995. The B-side track, "Girlfriend (Love Letter Version)", which was an arrangement of the A-side title track, was used in the award-winning 1995 romance movie, Love Letter.

== Track listing ==
1. "Girlfriend"
2. "Girlfriend (Love Letter Version)"
3. "Boku de Irareru You Ni" (僕でいられるように)
