= Lostman Go to Budokan =

Video by The Pillows
- Released: January 27, 2010
- Recorded: at Nippon Budokan
- Genre: Alternative rock
- Label: Avex Trax

Lostman Go to Budokan is a live performance video by Japanese alternative rock band The Pillows on September 16, 2009 at Nippon Budokan.The event marks the band's 20th anniversary (The Pillows started their career on September 16, 1989). It's their first performance at Budokan. The video album went on to chart and peaked at number 10 on Oricon DVD Chart.

== Track listing ==
1. Thank you my twilight
2. MY FOOT
3. No Surrender
4. Another Morning
5. Wake up! dodo
6. Propose
7. Scarecrow
8. New Animal
9. 90's MY LIFE
10. Boku wa kakera
11. ONE LIFE
12. 1989
13. Sullivan ni naritai
14. Ladybird girl
15. Funny Bunny
16. I know you
17. Strange Chameleon
18. The Third Eye
19. Konoyo no Hate Made
20. Sono mirai wa Ima
21. Ame Agari ni Mita Maboroshi
22. Hybryd Rainbow
23. Please Mr.Lostman
24. Swanky Street
25. Calvero
26. Ride on shooting star
27. LITTLE BUSTERS
28. POISON ROCK'N'ROLL
