= My Foot =

Studio album by The Pillows
- Released: January 12, 2006 (JP); July 4, 2006 (United States)
- Genre: Alternative rock
- Length: 41:08
- Label: King Records (JP); KICS-1214; Geneon (US)
- Producer: Zin Yoshida; Terry Ho

The Pillows chronology
Good Dreams (2004)	My Foot (2006)	Wake Up! Wake Up! Wake Up! (2007)

Singles from My Foot
- 1. "Non Fiction" Released: September 14, 2005; 2. "The Third Eye" Released: November 23, 2005; 3. "Gazelle City" Released: February 26, 2006

My Foot is an album released by The Pillows on January 12, 2006 in Japan and on July 4, 2006 in the United States. The album was produced by Zin Yoshida of Salon Music and Terry Ho.

== Reception ==
The album currently holds a rating of 3.46 at Rate Your Music.

== Music ==
Rhythm guitarist and vocalist Sawao Yamanaka explained that this album emphasizes combination of simple sounds, particularly through use of twin guitar.

== Track listing ==
All songs by Sawao Yamanaka.

1. "My Foot"
2. "Rock'n'Roll Sinners"
3. "The Air Resistor" (空中レジスター)
4. "The Third Eye" (サード アイ)
5. "Mighty Lovers"
6. "Non Fiction" (ノンフィクション)
7. "Degeneration"
8. "March of the God"
9. "My Girl (Document Version)"
10. "Sayonara Universe" (さよならユニバース)
11. "Gazelle City"
