= White Incarnation =

1992 album by the Pillows

Studio album by The Pillows
- Released: May 21, 1992
- Genre: Jangle pop; indie pop
- Length: 47:09
- Label: Pony Canyon; PCCA-00369
- Producer: Ryomei Shirai; The Pillows

The Pillows chronology
Moon Gold (1991)	White Incarnation (1992)	Kool Spice (1994)

White Incarnation is the second studio album released by The Pillows on May 21, 1992. It is the band's last record to feature the original lineup, as bassist Kenji Ueda left shortly after. Recorded in Britain, the album shows heavy influence from British bands such as The Smiths and The Stone Roses, as well as experimentation with the more jazz-oriented style that would characterize The Pillows' following two albums.

== Track listing ==
1. "Colorful Pumpkin Fields" (カラフル・パンプキン・フィールズ KARAFURU PANPUKIN FIRUZU))
2. "She's My Sister" (彼女はシスター Kanojo wa SISUTA)
3. "Sitting on a Paper Moon" (ペーパームーンにこしかけて PEPAMUN ni Koshikakete)
4. "Right Here Like This" (このままここで Kono mama koko de)
5. "I Want to Be Sullivan" (サリバンになりたい SARIBAN ni Naritai)
6. "Hey, I Don't Care" (気にしてないよ)
7. "Blue March" (ブルーマーチ BURU MACHI)
8. "Dawn Has Come" (夜明けがやってきた)
9. "Tonight"
10. "Our Halley's Comet" (ぼくらのハレー彗星)
11. "Good Night"

== Personnel ==
- Sawao Yamanaka - lead vocals, guitar
- Yoshiaki Manabe - lead guitar
- Kenji Ueda – bass
- Shinichiro Sato - drums
