= Happy Bivouac =

Studio album by the pillows
- Released: December 2, 1999
- Studio: Aobadai Studio, Tokyo; Freedom Studio, Tokyo
- Genre: power pop; jangle pop; garage rock
- Length: 42:46
- Label: King KICS-758
- Producer: Zin Yoshida

The pillows chronology
Runners High (1999)	Happy Bivouac (1999)	Fool on the Planet (2001)

Singles from Happy Bivouac
- 1. "Carnival" Released: July 28, 1999; 2. "Rush" Released: October 27, 1999

Happy Bivouac (named as Happy Bivouac on the Hillari Step on album sleeve, booklet and CD art) is an album released by Japanese band the Pillows on December 2, 1999. It marks the band's first record with Jun Suzuki from The Chewinggum Weekend on bass, who would play with group for over 15 years until his dismissal in 2015. The album was produced by Zin Yoshida of Salon Music. As with its predecessor Runners High, several songs from the album were used for the anime series FLCL.

Happy Bivouac contains several references to the American band Pixies. Track 8 is named after Pixies bassist Kim Deal and at the end of "Back Seat Dog", the pillows can be heard singing the chorus of "Here Comes Your Man" from the album Doolittle. "Crazy Sunshine" and "Funny Bunny", had already been written during the production of LITTLE BUSTERS, and producer Jin Yoshida had instructed to complete them with lyrics. However, Yamanaka was adamant that he couldn't fill in the lyrics in time, so the song was cancelled, and instead, Hello, Welcome to Bubbletown's Happy Zoo (instant show) and LITTLE BUSTERS, were used instead.

== Track listing ==
All tracks are written by Sawao Yamanaka

No.	Title	Length
1.	"HAPPY BIVOUAC"	3:28
2.	"RUSH"	3:39
3.	"LAST DINOSAUR"	3:44
4.	"カーニバル (Carnival)"	3:49
5.	"Our love and peace"	4:10
6.	"Crazy Sunshine"	4:07
7.	"Back seat dog"	3:59
8.	"Kim deal"	4:12
9.	"Funny Bunny"	3:37
10.	"Beautiful morning with you"	5:43
11.	"Advice"	2:14
Total length:		42:46

== Personnel ==
=== the pillows ===
- Sawao Yamanaka — Guitar, vocals
- Yoshiaki Manabe — Guitar
- Shinichiro Sato — drums

Additional musicians

- Jun Suzuki - Bass
