= Good Dreams =

Studio album by the Pillows
- Released: November 3, 2004
- Recorded: Freedom Studio
- Length: 36:48
- Label: King Records; KICS-1121
- Producer: Zin Yoshida

The Pillows chronology
Synchronized Rockers (2004)	Good Dreams (2004)	My Foot (2006)

Singles from Good Dreams
- 1. "Sono Mirai wa Ima" Released: October 6, 2004

Good Dreams is the 12th studio album by the Pillows, released on November 3, 2004. The album was produced by Zin Yoshida of Salon Music.

== Track listing ==
1. "Xavier" – 2:00
2. "Walkin' on the Spiral" – 3:25
3. "Sono Mirai wa Ima" (その未来は今) – 3:26
4. "You Stood There, Like an Angel" (天使みたいにキミは立ってた) – 3:12
5. "Orange Film Garden" (オレンジ・フィルム・ガーデン) – 4:46
6. "Frontiers" (フロンティアーズ) – 2:55
7. "Lo-fi Boy, Fighter Girl" (ローファイボーイ, ファイターガール) – 3:01
8. "New Year's Eve" – 3:41
9. "Bad Dreams" – 2:49
10. "Good Dreams" – 4:45
11. "Rosy Head" – 2:48
