= Kool Spice =

Studio album by The Pillows
- Released: July 2, 1994
- Genre: Jangle pop; smooth jazz
- Length: 29:33
- Label: King Records; KICS-421
- Producer: The Pillows; Takaharu Kobayashi (co-producer)

The Pillows chronology
White Incarnation (1992)	Kool Spice (1994)	Living Field (1995)

Kool Spice is an album released by the Pillows on July 2, 1994. It is the band's first record to be released through King Records. Original bassist Kenji Ueda was replaced for this album by guest bassist Tatsuya Kashima.

== Track listing ==
1. "Monochrome Lovers" (モノクロームラバーズ) – 3:55
2. "Be Careful of Love Spies" (恋のスパイに気をつけろ) – 3:27
3. "Twilight Park Waltz" (公園～黄昏のワルツ～) – 3:34
4. "Sha-La-La-Lla" – 4:47
5. "Toy Doll" – 3:34
6. "Naked Shuffle" – 3:49
7. "In Front of a Locked Door" (開かない扉の前で) – 6:26
