= Trial (album) =

Studio album by The Pillows
- Released: January 18, 2012
- Genre: Alternative rock
- Length: 39:32
- Label: Avex Trax

The Pillows chronology
Horn Again (2011)	Trial (2012)	Moondust (2014)

Trial is the eighteenth studio album by Japanese alternative rock band The Pillows. It was released on January 18, 2012.

== Track listing ==
All tracks are written by Sawao Yamanaka.

No.	Title	Length
1.	"Revival"	3:16
2.	"Rescue"	3:46
3.	"Comic Sonic"	2:53
4.	"Flashback Story"	2:31
5.	"Energia (エネルギヤ)"	4:07
6.	"Polaris no Kagayaki Hirowanakatta Yumeutsutsu (ポラリスの輝き 拾わなかった夢現)"	4:01
7.	"Minority Whisper"	3:53
8.	"Mochinushi No Nai Guitar (持ち主のないギター)"	7:18
9.	"Trial"	4:25
10.	"Ready Steady Go!"	3:22
Total length:		39:32
