= 90's My Life =

- Cover to the original edition

EP by The Pillows
- Released: October 25, 1990; March 8, 2004 (reissue)
- Length: 21:48; 47:54 (re-release)
- Labels: Captain Records; HOMO-001; AAD Records (reissue); BUMP-016
- Producer: The Pillows Takaharu Kobayashi

The Pillows chronology
Pantomime (1990)	90's My Life (1990)	Moon Gold (1991)

Alternative cover
- 2004 reissue cover

90's My Life is the second EP by The Pillows, released on October 25, 1990. It was re-released on March 8, 2004 as 90's My Life Returns with five additional tracks and an extended version of "Paris Girl Marie". The original EP, like its predecessor Pantomime, has since gone out of print.

== Track listing ==
All tracks are written by Sawao Yamanaka, except where noted.

1990 release
No.	Title	Length
1.	"Paris Girl Marie" (巴里の女性マリー)	3:44
2.	"I'm a Broken Piece" (ぼくは かけら)	2:45
3.	"Transparent Far-off Letter" (透きとおる遠い手紙; Sawao Yamanaka/Kenji Ueda)	4:35
4.	"Never Find"	5:18
5.	"90's My Life"	5:26

2004 re-release
No.	Title	Length
1.	"Paris Girl Marie" (巴里の女性マリー)	4:22
2.	"I'm a Broken Piece" (ぼくは かけら)	2:45
3.	"Transparent Far-off Letter" (透きとおる遠い手紙; Sawao Yamanaka/Kenji Ueda)	4:35
4.	"Never Find"	5:18
5.	"90's My Life"	5:26
6.	"I Can Hear Jingle Bells" (ジングル・ベルが聞こえる)	4:18
7.	"If This Kind of Day Could Go On" (こんな日が続けばいいのに)	4:12
8.	"Though My Voice Disappears in the Wind" (僕の声が風に消されても)	6:20
9.	"I'm an Outsider" (僕はアウトサイダー)	5:13
10.	"I Don't Cry"	5:25
