= Smile (The Pillows album) =

Studio album by The Pillows
- Released: October 31, 2001
- Recorded: Bazooka Studio
- Genres: Alternative rock, power pop
- Length: 45:01
- Label: King Records

The Pillows chronology
Fool on the Planet (2001)	Smile (2001)	Thank You, My Twilight (2002)

Smile is an album released by The Pillows on October 31, 2001. It contains several references to the work of Charlie Chaplin, such as "Smile" and "Calvero".

== Track listing ==
1. "Good Morning Good News" – 3:26
2. "Waiting at the Bus stop" – 2:11
3. "All the Way to the Edge of this World" (この世の果てまで) – 3:49
4. "Monster C.C" – 4:14
5. "Skim Heaven" – 3:49
6. "Winning Come Back!" – 1:16
7. "Vain Dog (in rain drop)" – 3:33
8. "Fun Fun Fun Ok!" – 3:35
9. "Thunder Whales Picnic" – 2:55
10. "Everyday Songs" (日々のうた) – 3:46
11. "Smile" – 6:14
12. "Calvero" – 2:00
