= Ameagari ni mita Maboroshi =

Single by The Pillows

from the album OOPArts
- B-side: "Fighting Pose"
- Released: September 2, 2009
- Genre: Alternative rock
- Length: 8:04
- Label: Avex Trax
- Songwriter(s): Sawao Yamanaka

The Pillows singles chronology
"New Animal" (2008)	"Ameagari ni mita Maboroshi" (2009)	"Lightning Runaway (No Music, No Life)" (2009)

"Ameagari ni mita Maboroshi" (A vision seen after a rain) is the 29th single by the pillows, released on September 2, 2009. It appears on their 20th album OOPArts (2009). It reached number 7 on the Oricon Weekly Singles Chart.

== Tracks ==
1. Ameagari ni mita Maboroshi (雨上がりに見た幻)
2. Fighting Pose (ファイティングポーズ)

== Chart performance ==
Chart	Peak position
Oricon Daily	3
Oricon Weekly	7
2008 Oricon Top 100 Singles	?
