= OOPArts (album) =

Studio album by The Pillows
- Released: October 14, 2009
- Genre: Alternative rock
- Length: 36:14
- Label: Avex Trax

The Pillows chronology
Once upon a time in the pillows (2009)	OOPArts (2009)	Horn Again (2011)

Professional ratings
Review scores
Source	Rating
Allmusic	4.5/5 stars

OOPArts (stylized as OOPARTS and named after Out-of-place artifacts) is the sixteenth album by The Pillows, released on October 14, 2009. The album marks the 20th anniversary of the band.

== Track listing ==
1. "Dance with God"
2. "Your Order"
3. "Melody"
4. "Lemon Drops"
5. "Foxes"
6. "Beyond the moon"
7. "Johnny Strobe"
8. "Ameagari ni mita Maboroshi (Hybrid Rainbow After The Rain)"
9. "Life Size Life (The Bag is Small, And I Don't Enter)"
10. "Primer Beat"
