= Noodles (band) =

Japanese alternative rock band

- Origin: Yokohama, Japan
- Genres: Alternative rock, Indie rock
- Years active: 1991–present
- Labels: Benten Label, Delicious Label
- Members: Yoko; Ikuno
- Past members: Junko; Ayumi
- Website: Official website

Noodles is a Japanese alternative rock band currently consisting of Yoko (vocals/guitar) and Ikuno (bass). The band is originally from Yokohama, where they performed their first show.

They are well known for the song "Love My Life", which they recorded for the movie of the same name, Love My Life.

== History ==
Noodles was formed in 1991 by four co-workers in Yokohama: Yoko, Ikuno, Ayumi and Junko. They released their debut album, Juryoku Dorobō (重力泥棒, The Gravity Thief), on Benten Label in 1995. In their mini review of the record, CD Journal compared the band's sound to Nelories and early-era Pretenders. Noodles made their American debut in 2003, performing at the CMJ Music Marathon.

Ayumi left Noodles in December 2017. Yoko and Ikuno continued the band as a duo with a session drummer. They released their first album following Ayumi's departure, I'm Not Chic, in May 2019. The album featured Yuka Yoshimura on drums, who also performed with Noodles as a support member, and utilized artwork from Yoshitomo Nara. I'm Not Chic reached a peak position of 80 on the Billboard Japan Top Albums Sales chart.

== Discography ==
Noodles discography
- Studio albums: 14
- Extended plays: 6
- Compilation albums: 1
- Singles: 4
- Video albums: 5
- VA (Various Artist): 8

=== Studio albums ===
- The Gravity Thief (1995.02.24 Benten Label)
- Slow Coaster (1997.06.25 Benten Label)
- Long Long Chain (2001.12.12 Delicious Label)
- God Cable (2003.02.14 Delicious Label)
- Ivy (2005.04.13 Delicious Label)
- Cover Me Shakespeare (2006.07.13 Delicious Label)
- Metropolis (2007.10.17 Delicious Label)
- Snap (2008.10.15 Delicious Label)
- Explorer (2010.08.04 Delicious Label)
- Funtime (2012.09.05 Delicious Label)
- MAKE UP TO BREAK UP (2013.08.07 Delicious Label) (Cover album)
- Loafers on the Japantown (2014.12.10 Delicious Label)
- Metallic Nocturne (2017.06.21 Delicious Label)
- I'm not chic (2019.05.29 Delicious Label)
- Storyteller (2025 Delicious Label)

=== EPs ===
- Deep Beyond the Dream (夢の奥のもっと奥) (1998.06.25 Benten Label)
- 6 Colors (1999.04.25 Benten Label)
- Lite Pop (1999.07.28 Delicious Label)
- Rainbow (1999.12.02 Delicious Label)
- Fuzz Hill (2004.4.26 Delicious Label)
- The Music Moves Me (2009.10.14 Delicious Label)

=== Singles ===
- "Booster" (2000.08.09 Delicious Label)
- "Hush Bell" (2001.01.24 Delicious Label)
- "Lesson 1" (2002.08.14 Delicious Label)
- "We Are noodles From Sentimental" (20th Anniversary Limited Single) (2011.08.10 Delicious Label)
- "Blood Waltz" (25th Anniversary Limited Single) (2016.11.11 Delicious Label)
- "Glorious My Page" (30th Anniversary Single) (2023 Delicious Label)

=== Compilations ===
- our first noodles (2009.10.14 Delicious Label) (DELICIOUS LABEL 10th Anniversary)
- Lemon Soda and Time Machine (2023.10.15 Delicious Label) (Remix Album)

=== Compilations (with or by other artists) ===
- Benten Unplugged (1996 Benten Label)
- Factory CD (2000)
- Life is Delicious (2001.08.08 Delicious Label)
- My Room is Delicious Vol.1 (2001.09.25 Delicious Label)
- My Room is Delicious Vol.2 (2002.01.23 Delicious Label)
- Synchronized Rockers (シンクロナイズド・ロッカーズ) (2004 King Records)
- GO! DELICIOUS GO! (2005.11.2 Delicious Label)
- ELECTRIC RAYS (2008.05.28 Delicious Label)

=== Soundtracks ===
- Love My Life original soundtrack (2007.01.17 Delicious Label)

=== Videography ===
- NOODLES COME TRUE (1997.01.01 Benten Label) Printing limited to 1,000
- On the Wall (2005.01.01 Delicious Label)
- Delicious Bump Tour in USA (2005)
- Delicious Bump Show!! (various artists, 2006)
- We Are noodles (20th anniversary live DVD) (2012)
