= Little Busters =

Studio album by The Pillows
- Released: February 21, 1998
- Genre: power pop; jangle pop; garage rock
- Length: 44:39
- Label: King Records; KICS-666
- Producer: Zin Yoshida

The Pillows chronology
Please Mr. Lostman (1997)	Little Busters (1998)	Runners High (1999)

Singles from Little Busters
- 1. "One Life" Released: June 28, 1997; 2. "Hybrid Rainbow" Released: November 21, 1997; 3. "Another Morning" Released: January 21, 1998

Little Busters is an album released by the Pillows on February 21, 1998. The album was produced by Zin Yoshida of Salon Music. Several songs from the record were later featured in the anime mini-series FLCL by Gainax. In 2020, Jonathan McNamara of The Japan Times listed it as one of the 10 Japanese albums worthy of inclusion on Rolling Stone's 2020 list of the 500 greatest albums of all time.

== Track listing ==
1. "Hello, Welcome to Bubbletown's Happy Zoo (instant show)" - 2:20
2. "Another Morning" (アナザーモーニング) - 4:36
3. "One Life" (album mix) - 4:05
4. "That House" - 4:21
5. "Like a Lovesong (Back to Back)" album mix - 3:04
6. "Nowhere" - 5:07
7. "Hybrid Rainbow" (ハイブリッド レインボウ) - 4:01
8. "Blues Drive Monster" - 3:25
9. "Patricia" album mix (パトリシア) - 4:55
10. "Black Sheep" - 3:26
11. "Little Busters" - 3:41
  - "Little Busters (Reprise)" - 1:47 (Hidden track)
