= Runners High =

Studio album by The Pillows
- Released: January 22, 1999
- Recorded: Bazooka Studio
- Genre: power pop; jangle pop; garage rock
- Length: 41:07
- Label: King Records; KICS-710
- Producer: Zin Yoshida

The Pillows chronology
Little Busters (1998)	Runners High (1999)	Happy Bivouac (1999)

Singles from Runners High
- 1. "No Self Control" Released: September 2, 1998; 2. "Instant Music" Released: November 27, 1998

Runners High is an album released by the Pillows on January 22, 1999. It was the last album to feature guest bassist, Tatsuya Kashima. Several songs from the record were later featured in the anime OVA series FLCL by Gainax. The album was produced by Zin Yoshida of Salon Music.

== Track listing ==
1. "Sad Sad Kiddie" – 3:03
2. "Instant Music" (インスタント ミュージック) – 3:17
3. "Juliet" – 3:45
4. "White Ash" – 1:41
5. "No Self Control" – 3:37
6. "Wake Up, Frenzy!" – 3:16
7. "Paper Triangle" – 2:10
8. "Bran-new Lovesong" – 4:24
9. "Midnight Down" – 3:23
10. "Borderline Case" – 4:05
11. "Runners High" – 2:44
12. "Let's See, If That's True or Not" (確かめに行こう) – 5:07
