= Horn Again =

Studio album by The Pillows
- Released: January 26, 2011
- Genre: Alternative rock
- Length: 36:01
- Label: Avex Trax

The Pillows chronology
OoParts (Out of Place Artifacts) (2009)	Horn Again (2011)	Trial (2012)

Horn Again is the seventeenth studio album by Japanese alternative rock band The Pillows. It was released on January 26, 2011.

== Track listing ==
All tracks are written by Sawao Yamanaka.

No.	Title	Length
1.	"Limp Tomorrow"	4:42
2.	"Give Me Up!"	2:33
3.	"Movement"	4:15
4.	"Lily, My Sun"	3:52
5.	"Biography"	3:27
6.	"Sad Fad Love"	3:49
7.	"Nobody Knows What Blooms"	3:38
8.	"EMERALD CITY"	3:04
9.	"Brilliant Crown"	5:44
10.	"Doggie Howl"	3:21
