= The Pillows =

Japanese alternative rock band

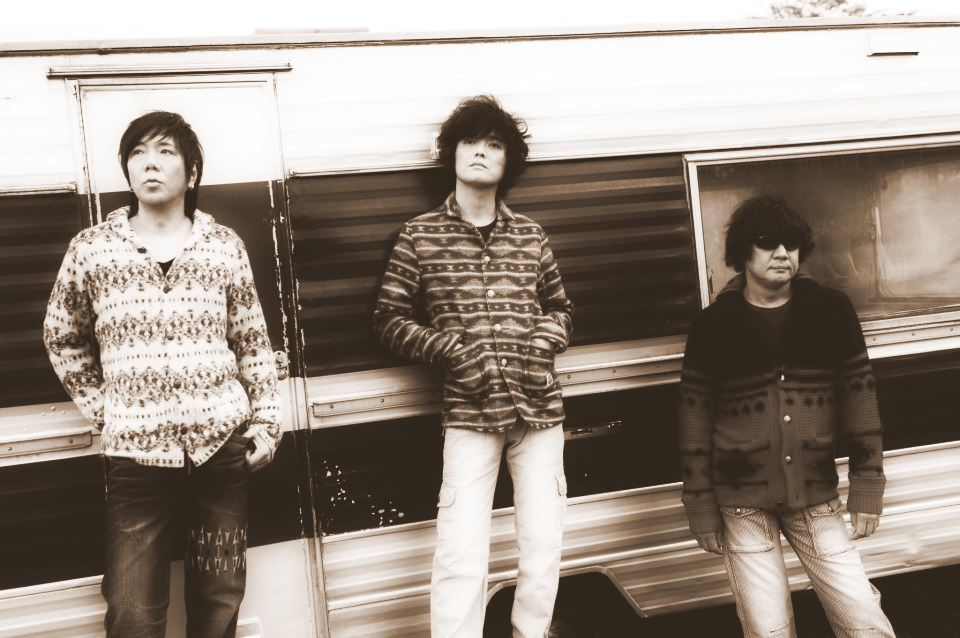
- The Pillows in 2011. From left: Yoshiaki Manabe, Sawao Yamanaka, Shinichiro Sato.

Background information
- Origin: Hokkaido, Japan
- Genres: Alternative rock, pop rock, garage rock, indie rock, post-grunge, power pop (early), new wave (early), jangle pop (early)
- Years active: 1989–2025
- Labels: Delicious, King, Captain, Pony Canyon, Avex Trax
- Past members: Sawao Yamanaka; Yoshiaki Manabe; Shinichiro Sato; Kenji Ueda
- Website: pillows.jp/p

The Pillows (Japanese: ザ・ピロウズ, Hepburn: Za Pirōzu) were a Japanese alternative rock band formed in Hokkaido in 1989. Originally a quartet, vocalist and rhythm guitarist Sawao Yamanaka, lead guitarist Yoshiaki Manabe and drummer Shinichiro Sato continued the band as a trio for another 33 years, following the departure of bassist Kenji Ueda in 1992. They are best known in the West for providing the soundtrack for the anime series FLCL. The Pillows announced their disbandment at the end of January 2025, and Sato died from cancer in March 2026.

== History ==
=== Formation and early years (1989–1994) ===
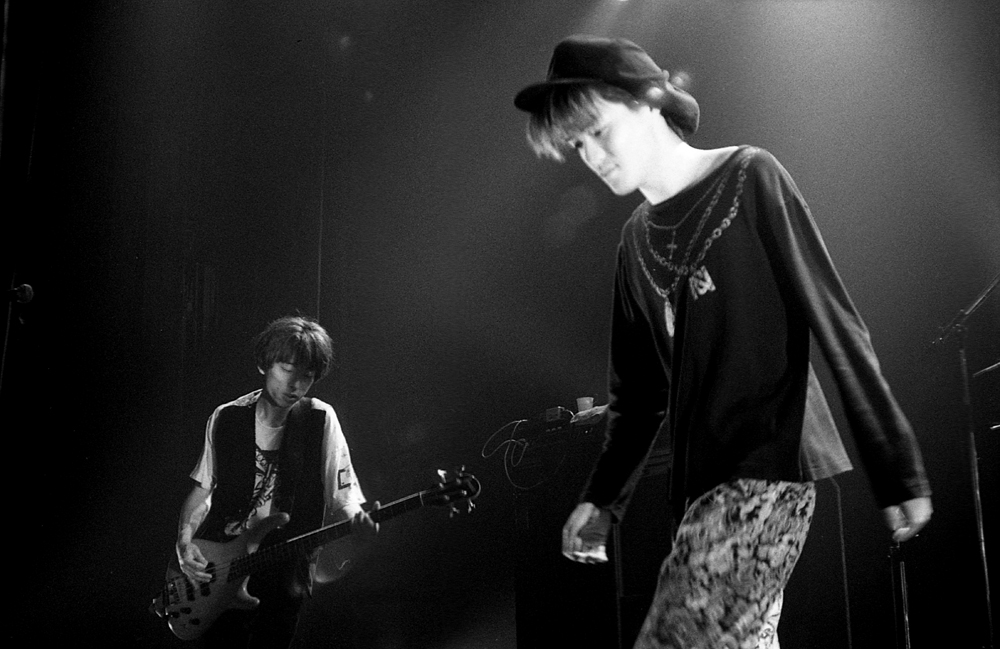
The Pillows in 1989

In 1989 Kenji Ueda, bassist for Kenzi & the Trips, left the band with former Kenzi's drummer Shinichiro Sato and invited the Coin Locker Babies vocalist Sawao Yamanaka to form a new band. Yoshiaki Manabe, the guitarist of the hair metal band Persia, joined them. The Pillows were formed on 16 September 1989. The story as to where the band's name came about is that allegedly Sawao Yamanaka was hanging out at Yoshiaki Manabe's place and an English post-punk compilation record entitled Pillows & Prayers hanging on Manabe's wall inspired him.

Ueda and Yamanaka were the main songwriters and the Pillows released their first EPs, Pantomime and 90's My Life in 1990 under Captain Records.

In 1991 they contracted with major label Pony Canyon and released their debut single, "Ame ni Utaeba", in May and their first full-length record Moon Gold in June.

In 1992 the Pillows visited England to record their second full-length album, White Incarnation, and filmed the promotional video for their second single, "Kanojo wa Shisuta". Shortly after the release of White Incarnation, Ueda left the Pillows due to disagreements with other members and musical differences.

After a year with no activity or leadership, Sawao Yamanaka took over Ueda's leadership role and recruited Tatsuya Kashima as a replacement on bass, restarting the band. Out of respect for Ueda, Kashima was labeled as a guest musician on releases on which he performed and Ueda's bassist post has never been officially replaced. The extremely rare The Pillows Presents Special CD, released only to the Pillows fanclub, contained their first recordings with Kashima.

In 1994 the Pillows changed to King Records and the band wildly experimented between varying genres. In July the Pillows released their first album as a trio, Kool Spice, and one month later the single "Daydream Wonder" was released.

=== Breakthrough and FLCL (1995–2000) ===
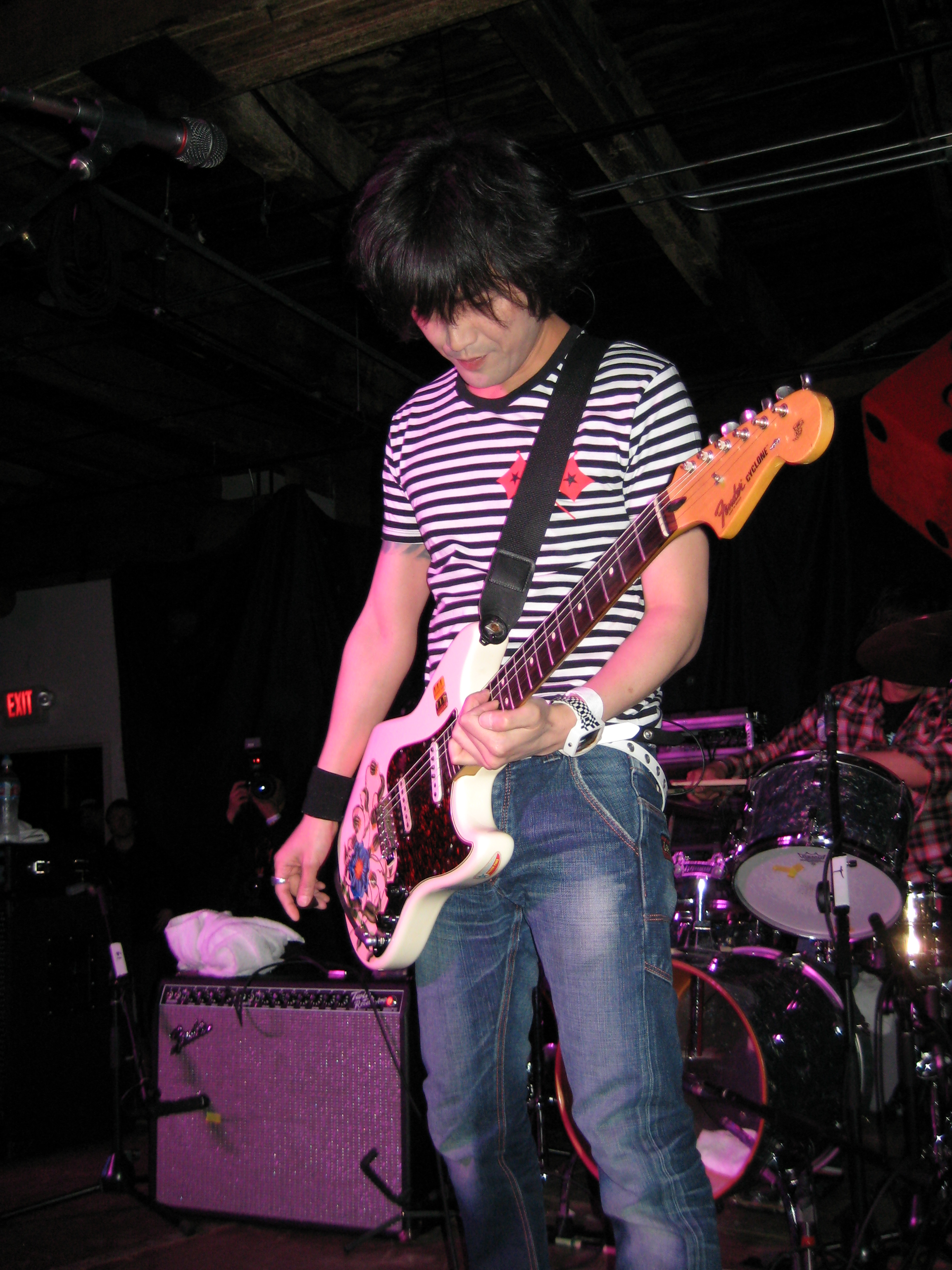
Yamanaka performing in Seattle during the Delicious Bump Tour, 2008

In March 1995 the Pillows released their fourth album, Living Field. Their subsequent single, "Girlfriend", was used in the romance movie Love Letter.

In the following year, after the release of their fifth single "Tiny Boat", the Pillows would release a series of singles such as "Strange Chameleon", "Swanky Street", and "Trip Dancer" that were featured on their breakthrough and acclaimed album Please Mr. Lostman.

In March of the same year, due to the success of Please Mr. Lostman the Pillows released one of the album's tracks, "Kanojo wa Kyou" as a single. Later that year, two new singles were released, "One Life" in June and "Hybrid Rainbow" in November, which became one of the Pillows' most recognizable songs, being largely featured on concert set lists.

In January 1998, the Pillows released their twelfth single "Another Morning" and their first concert DVD "Hello, Welcome to Bubbletown's Happy Zoo". The last three singles were featured on their sixth album Little Busters, which came out in February and became one of their most well known and commercial records. Two more singles followed, "Instant Music" and "No Self Control" would both be used on their 1999 album Runners High.

The year of 1999 started with the release of Runners High and to celebrate their 10th anniversary, the Pillows released their first video clips compilation DVD, "We Have a Theme Song", followed by two new singles ("Carnival" and "Rush"), both featured on the second studio album release of that year, Happy Bivouac. This record pays tribute to the Pixies in songs such as "Back Seat Dog" and "Kim Deal" and it is the first album to feature support bassist Jun Suzuki as a replacement for Kashima.

In the same year, the Pillows were approached by the anime studio Gainax, which licensed the Pillows' three previous albums for the soundtrack of the original video animation FLCL. The Pillows also composed two new songs for the show, "Ride on Shooting Star" and "I Think I Can", which were later included on their greatest hits compilation album Fool on the Planet.

Due to their participation in FLCL's soundtrack, the Pillows enjoyed a popularity increase, making their western fan base grow. This allowed them to release their "Ride on Shooting Star" single in the United States in 2000 and later tour that country.

=== Early 2000s, 15th anniversary and US debut (2001–2006) ===
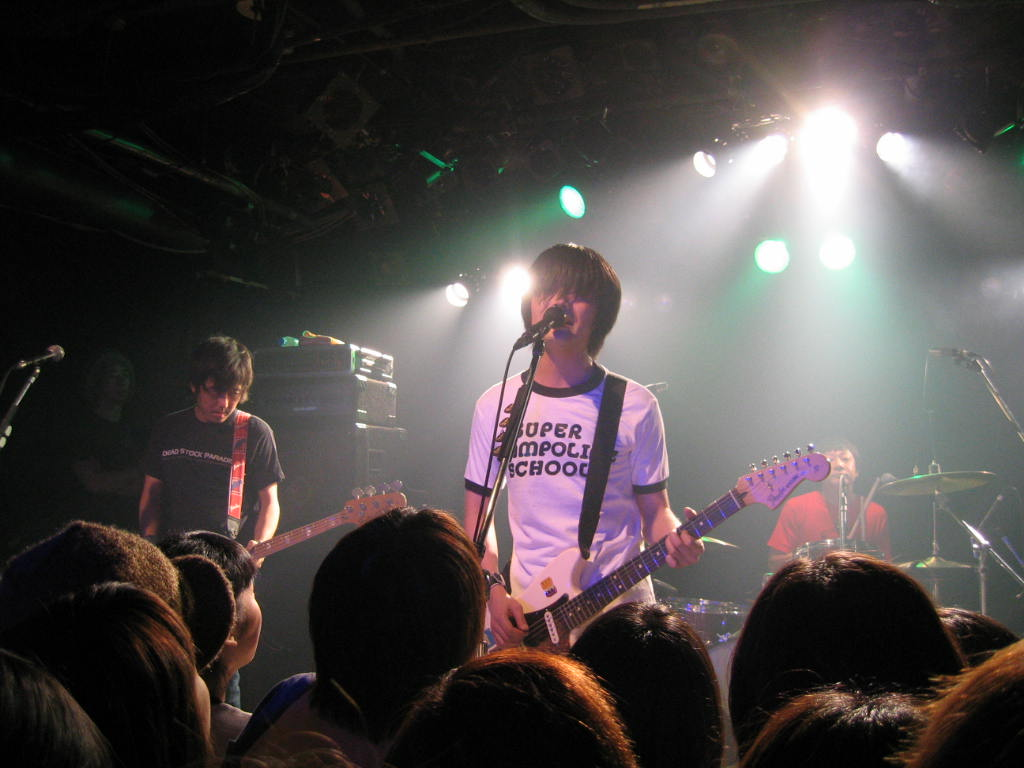
The Pillows performing at Shibuya Club Quattro in 2003

After their participation on FLCL's soundtrack, the Pillows released their first greatest-hits compilation album Fool on the Planet in 2001 and also a live DVD called Busters on the Planet and a new album, Smile.

In 2002, the FLCL anime became available in the United States, giving the band more notoriety outside of their native country. In October of the same year Thank You, My Twilight, the Pillows' tenth studio album, was released alongside a double-CD collection of B-sides entitled Another Morning, Another Pillows, following the promotional single "White Summer and Green Bicycle, Red Hair with Black Guitar".

In 2003, the Pillows released their second video clips DVD Dead Stock Paradise, one single, "Terminal Heaven's Rock" and one more studio album, Penalty Life, which was later released in the US by Geneon in 2005.

To commemorate the band's 15th anniversary, the Pillows re-released their 90's My Life EP with additional tracks and released a string of new material, including a new EP with re-recorded tracks previously published between 1990 and 1996, Turn Back, one document DVD, Walkin' on The Spiral, one new studio album, Good Dreams, a new single, "Sono Mirai wa Ima" and finally a tribute album, Synchronized Rockers, including covers of the Pillows played by artists such as Mr. Children, Straightener and Noodles.

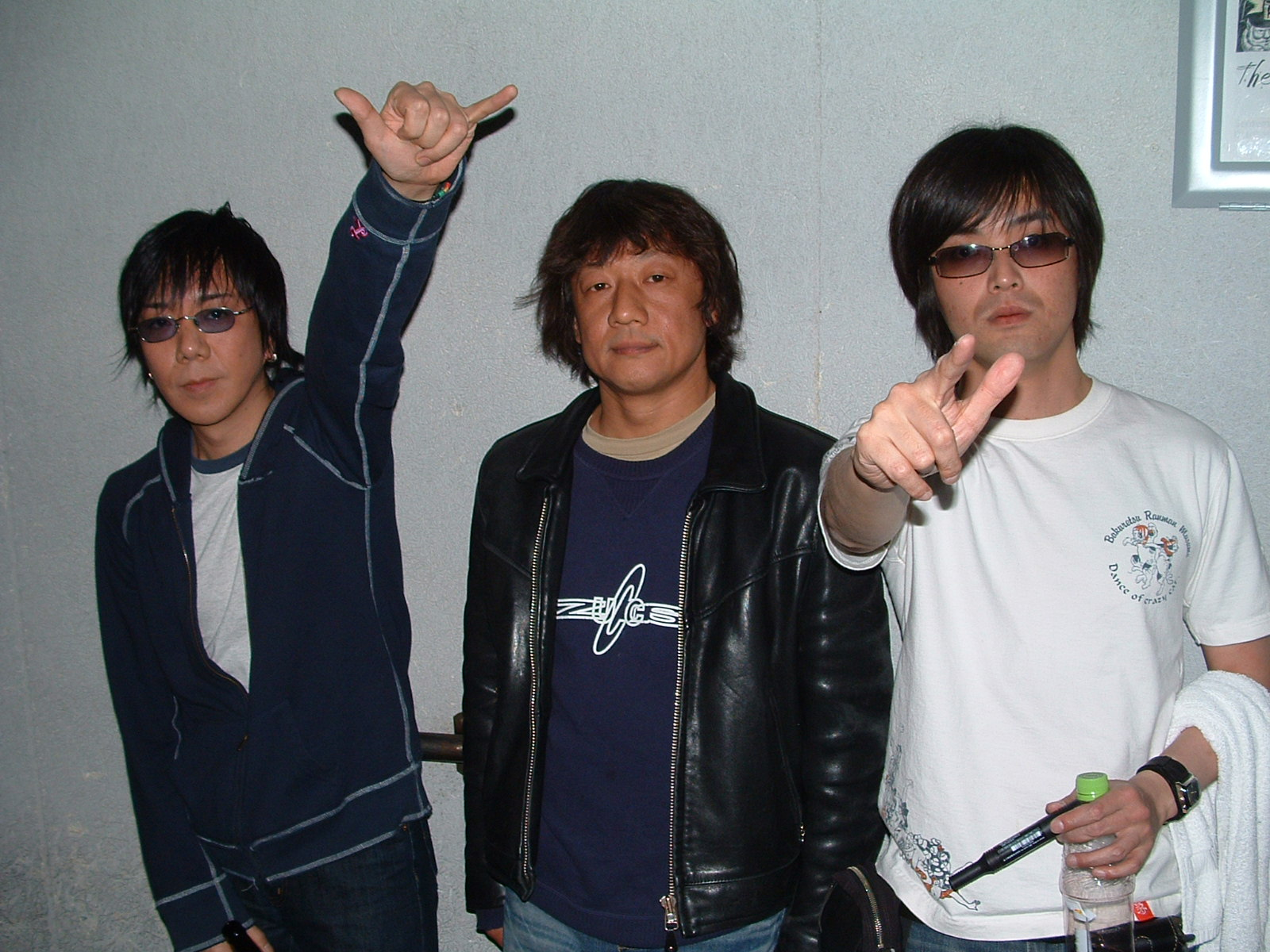
the Pillows in 2005. From left to right: Manabe, Sato, Yamanaka.

In January 2005 the Pillows released the live DVD 916 which features footage of their 15th anniversary concert of 2004.

In March 2005, the Pillows played their first show in the United States at South by Southwest in Austin, Texas, followed by concerts in New York City and San Francisco. In September, the band released a live DVD entitled Delicious Bump Tour in USA, featuring footage of their first tour in America with fellow band Noodles and also a new single, "Non Fiction". In November they released their second single of the year, "The Third Eye". Both singles were used on their subsequent 2006 album, My Foot.

In February 2006 to help promote the My Foot tour, one track of the album, "Gazelle City" was released as the album's third single. The album was released in the United States in July 2006 by Geneon, with a growing international fan-base and growing domestic sales of their albums and singles over the past four years.

In June, the Pillows returned to North America during their tour in support of the album My Foot, with several more dates in the U.S. and a show in Mexico City.

=== Move to Avex Trax, 20th and 25th anniversaries (2007–2014) ===
In 2007, the Pillows released their 25th single, "Scarecrow" which was used in the anime series Moonlight Mile, being included on their next album, Wake Up! Wake Up! Wake Up!. This album marks their first release on the Avex Trax label.

In August, the band released one more single, "Ladybird Girl", which is being used as the theme song for the Japanese version of the children's animated series Ben 10.

In November, the band released a five-disc singles collection, Lostman Go to Yesterday, featuring all the band's singles released under the King Records label and 21 music videos on a DVD in the same collection. On the same day they also released their fifth live DVD, Lostman Go to America featuring footage of their 2006 American tour in support for the album My Foot.

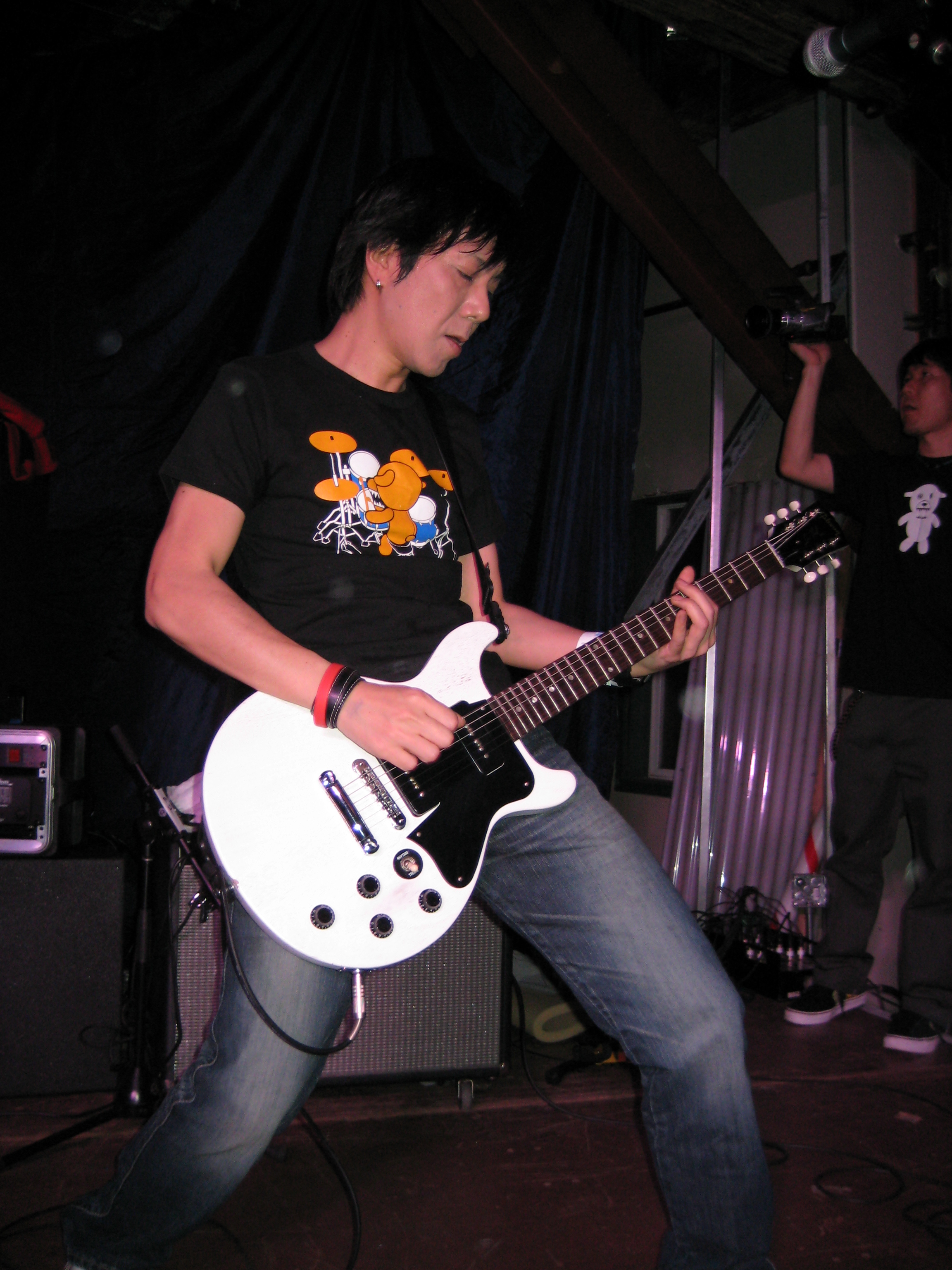
Manabe performing in Seattle during the Delicious Bump Tour, 2008

In January 2008, the band released a live DVD, Wake up! Stand up! and Go!, featuring footage of their Wake Up! Tour of 2007 and a single, "Tokyo Bambi". On May a new single came out, "New Animal", and along with their previous two singles, it is featured on their fifteenth studio album, Pied Piper.

The band returned to the US starting with Los Angeles, followed by other appearances at SXSW, San Francisco, Seattle, New York City, and Anime Boston, where the band played for a crowd of more than 5,000 people.

Still in 2008, legendary English rock band Oasis extended an offer for the Pillows to play as the opening act at their concert in Japan, but frontman Sawao Yamanaka refused their offer. In a January interview for Japanzine, Yamanaka joked that he "turned down the offer in order to have a fun story to tell".

In 2009, in order to celebrate their upcoming 20th anniversary, the Pillows issued a series of releases called "Late Bloomer Series". It includes two DVDs: Pied Piper Go to Yesterday and Blue Song With Blue Poppies, two best-of compilation albums, Rock Stock & Too Smoking the Pillows and Once Upon a Time in the Pillows, a single "Ameagari ni mita Maboroshi" (featured on their 16th studio album OOPArts (Out of Place Artifacts)) and later the DVD of their anniversary concert, Lostman Go to Budokan, released in the following year.

On 16 September, the Pillows gave their first concert in the legendary Nippon Budokan arena commemorating their 20th anniversary. The footage of the concert was later released in 2010 as their ninth live DVD, Lostman Go to Budokan.

In 2010, the Pillows recorded Rodeo Star Mate, their 30th single and opening theme song for the series, Stitch – Itazura Alien no Daibouken.

In June, the Pillows released their 10th live DVD, "Parts of OOParts" including footage of their 2010 OOParts tour. Then in December, the single, "Movement", was released.

In January 2011 the Pillows released their 17th studio album Horn Again with previously released singles included. In February the Pillows released their first single of the year, "Tabasco Disco", which was only available for purchase to concert audiences.

In June of the same year, the Pillows recorded "Comic Sonic" as the ending theme for the anime adaptation of the manga Sket Dance.

In September the Pillows and fellow band Noodles toured America for the second time together in the NAP Tour. They performed in Los Angeles, New York, San Francisco and Austin, Texas.

In October they released a live DVD, Born Again, containing footage of their 2011 Horn Again Tour, and in December they released the single, "Energia (エネルギヤ)".

On 18 January 2012 the Pillows released their album, Trial and, on the same day, a live DVD entitled We Are Friends, which included footage of their 2011 NAP Tour in America with Noodles. In June, following their Trial tour, the band released the DVD Real Trial containing the last live performance of the tour at Zepp Tokyo.

In a similar fashion to the "Late Bloomer Series" celebrating the band's 20th anniversary, the Pillows issued a string of releases over 2013 and 2014 in honor of their 25th anniversary. Entitled "Never Ending Story", this series of releases comprised a new tribute album ("Rock and Sympathy"), DVDs and Blu-ray's ("Revival of Motion Pictures" and “Do You Remember The 2nd Movement?”), a box set ("Our Black Flag"), three new singles ("Future", "Happy Birthday" and "About a Rock'n'Roll Band") and finally, the Pillows' 19th studio album Moondust. The band also performed three shows in 2014 representing each era ("movement") of their sound with Kenji Ueda being invited to play bass at a single show where the Pillows performed songs from his time with the band.

On 4 October 2014 the band concluded the "Never Ending Story" campaign with the "Don't Forget Today" show at Tokyo Dome City Hall and, on the same date, released Bootleg the Pillows 1992–1993, a compilation featuring various previously unreleased recordings. Their 25th anniversary concert DVD/ Blu-ray was released on January 1, 2015.

=== New FLCL seasons and 30th Anniversary (2015–2019) ===
Following the end of the "Never Ending Story" campaign, the Pillows began the Moondust Light for You tour at the beginning of 2015 in support of the Moondust album. The last concert of the tour was later released as a DVD/Blu-ray on 26 August 2015.

In May 2015, the band announced that longtime bassist Jun Suzuki had been fired from the band due to "bad conduct" that had been going on for some time. In this announcement, Yamanaka also discussed the possibility of continuing on without a "fixed" bass player. In place of Suzuki, who went on to form the band SABAH, the Pillows played with various different bassists for their remaining 2015 live shows. These included several appearances with original Pillows member Kenji Ueda and former "support member" Tatsuya Kashima, as well as Tomoyuki Miyakawa (of HiGE), and Yoshinori Arie (of Vola and the Oriental Machine). By 2016, the band had named Arie as their official replacement for Suzuki.

in 2016, the Pillows released a new B-sides compilation entitled Across the Metropolis as well as their 20th studio album. Entitled Stroll and Roll, the album includes a new version of "Radio Telegraphy"—originally recorded as a collaboration with Ryosuke Sasaki of A Flood of Circle—and "One Flew Under the Cuckoo's Nest", a live venue/mail order exclusive single. The album was released on 6 April, and features bass tracks performed by Kenji Ueda, Tatsuya Kashima, Yoshinori Arie, Tomoyuki Miyakawa, and Yamanaka's bandmate in The Predators, Jiro (of Glay). Additionally, the Pillows announced that Stroll and Roll would not be released on Avex Trax, as the band had signed to Yamanaka's Delicious Label with distribution by the Pillows' previous label King Records. The Across the Metropolis compilation was the band's last release with Avex Trax. The Pillows embarked on a 27-date tour in support of Stroll and Roll spanning from 6 May to 22 July, with the last show at Zepp Tokyo being recorded for Stroll and Roll Band, a live DVD/Blu-ray released on 23 November.

On 3 July 2016, it was announced that the Pillows would be providing the soundtrack for the anime series FLCL over two new seasons that eventually aired in 2018.

A new Pillows song entitled "Be Wild" was featured in a commercial for wrestler Eri Tosaka, who won the gold medal in the women's freestyle 48 kg event at the 2016 Summer Olympics (Tosaka herself is a Pillows fan, utilizing their song "Funny Bunny" as her fight song).

In November 2016, the Pillows released a digital single entitled "Be Your King" and in March 2017 they released a new studio album named "Nook in The Brain". In March 2017 a limited single entiled "The World There Is Nowhere" was released as live venue/mail order only exclusive and later appeared in the soundtrack of the movie 王様になれ (Be Your King). The "Nook in The World" tour's last concert was released as a DVD/Blu-ray in November 2017.

Following the release of the second season, FLCL Progressive, Adult Swim sponsored and presented a seven city tour across the US alongside a band on the same label called Noodles, as well as Cullen Omori formerly of the Smith Westerns.

On 5 September 2018, Toho released the fourth soundtrack from the anime series FLCL entitled "Fool on Cool Generation". The collection features 14 tracks composed by the Pillows, including music found in the FLCL Progressive and FLCL Alternative anime seasons, released together as part of the dual-theatrical showings of both series in Japan.

The Pillows released their 22nd studio album, Rebroadcast, under King Records and Delicious label on 19 September 2018. The Rebroadcast tour "Life is Only Once" DVD/Blu-ray was released in September 2019.

In March 2019, the Pillows announced their participation on the tribute album for UNISON SQUARE GARDEN's 15th anniversary as a band, covering the song "Shoegazer Speaker". It was released on 24 July.

In May 2019, it was announced that the Pillows' new song "Happy Go Ducky!" would be used as the opening theme for the anime series Ahiru no Sora premiering in October.

To celebrate the band's 30th anniversary, a feature film entitled 王様になれ ("Be the King") with music and original story by Sawao Yamanaka was released in Japan in the Fall season of 2019. Shûji Okui is responsible for the script and direction. The film stars actor Amane Okayama as Yuusuke, a young man who works in a ramen shop frequented by numerous Japanese rock bands. Yuusuke dreams of being a photographer, and he decides to follow his dreams by becoming a cameraman for live concert events. Ousama ni Nare also features appearances by numerous musicians, including: Teru and Jiro of Glay; Atsushi Horie, Hidekazu Hinata and Shinpei Nakayama of Straightener; Hirotaka Takahashi of The Predators; Ryosuke Sasaki, Tomoya Tabuchi, Hiroaki Arai and Hiroyuki Suzuki of THE KEBABS; Yoko and Shinya Kusube of Casablanca; Hirata Panda, Beat Ryo, Hoshikawa Don't Let Me Down, Honma Domino and Chiba O'Reilly of THE BOHEMIANS; Eiichi Miyamoto of syurispeiloff; Ena Fujita, Asako Miyazaki, Aya Matsuoka and Misaki Yoshikawa of SHISHAMO.

As another celebration of 30 years of the pillows' existence, the band also held their own temporary museum. Titled "the pillows museum: Buster's Diner" the event took the form of a vintage American diner filled with memorabilia related to the band. The shop also sold FLCL themed collaboration goods. The museum ran from 30 August 2019, to 8 September 2019, at Shibuya Tower Records, followed by a run from 13 to 22 September 2019 in Osaka.

=== 35th Anniversary and disbandment (2020–2025) ===
On 18 March 2020, the band released their 30th anniversary concert at Yokohama Arena as a DVD/Blu-ray entitled "Thank You My Highlight" and throughout 2021 until 2023 they released more DVDs/Blu-rays of the "Do You Remember The Third Movement?" series of concerts.

In anticipation of their 35th anniversary the band released a DVD/Blu-ray of their 2023-2024 "Lostman Go to The City" tour in June 2024 as well as a documentary. Entitled "Talking About a Rock'n'Roll Band" it consists of interviews with friends from other bands such as Base Ball Bear, THE BOHEMIANS, SHISHAMO, go!go!vanillas, ArtTheaterGuild and Kaminarigumo.

On 16 September 2024, the band celebrated their 35th anniversary with a concert at Toyosu Pit. The live footage was eventually released as a DVD/Blu-ray in 2025. On November 2 the band released "Blank", their last single.

On 31 January 2025, the Pillows announced they had officially disbanded following their concert at KT Zepp Yokohama earlier that day. They apologized for the sudden announcement and explained that, although they hesitated to use the word "disbanded", they did so in order to not "leave room for expectations of a future reunion". Sato died from esophageal cancer on 23 March 2026, at the age of 61. His death was announced on 28 March.

== Logo and mascot ==
The band's logo, as it has appeared on their releases since the 1998 album Little Busters

Buster-kun

Buster-kun has been the Pillows' mascot since about 1998, when on a visit to London, the band saw a doll of a "grotesque and creepy-looking teddy bear" in a shop window. Since then it has been constantly used in promotional videos, album artwork and goods such as T-shirts and bracelets. Buster-kun was named after the Little Busters album and the group also uses the term "little busters" for its fans. The original doll can be seen in the promotional video for the song "Hybrid Rainbow" and on the DVD video and artwork cover of the Hello, Welcome to Bubbletown's Happy Zoo (Instant Show) DVD.

In an interview, Sawao commented on the reason why they adopted Buster-kun and what it represents to the band's music:

The original doll was made out of really dirty old leather and had a real-looking eye and tongue, but one of the eyes was a button and it was displayed in a window, shaking like it was being electrocuted. We still don't know what it was and why it was there, because it wasn't in a store display window and it didn't look like it was for commercial purposes, but it just seemed like someone's idea of a prank or some artist's work that we thought was interesting. So we used it in our jacket booklet and while we were on tour, we thought of placing that bear image on T-shirts, so we sent the picture to a designer to arrange it. At first it looks cute, but once you get up close, it has sharp teeth like it's ready to bite any minute. So that kind-of-cute but kind-of-scary look fits right in with the Pillows music perfectly.

== Members ==
Final lineup

- Sawao Yamanaka (山中 さわお, Yamanaka Sawao) – vocals, rhythm guitar (1989–2025)
- Yoshiaki Manabe (真鍋吉明, Manabe Yoshiaki) – lead guitar (1989–2025)
- Shinichiro Sato (佐藤信一郎, Sato Shin'ichirō) – drums (1989–2025; died 2026)

Former members

- Kenji Ueda (上田ケンジ, Ueda Kenji) – bass (1989–1992)

Support members

- Tatsuya Kashima (鹿島達也, Kashima Tatsuya) – bass (1993–1998)
- Jun Suzuki (鈴木淳, Suzuki Jun) – bass (1998–2015)
- Yoshinori Arie (有江嘉典, Arie Yoshinori) – bass (2015–2024)
- Tomoyuki Miyakawa (宮川トモユキ, Miyakawa Tomoyuki) – bass (2024–2025)
- Takumaru Anzai (安西卓丸, Anzai Takumaru) – bass (2024–2025)

== Discography ==
Studio albums

- Moon Gold (1991)
- White Incarnation (1992)
- Kool Spice (1994)
- Living Field (1995)
- Please Mr. Lostman (1997)
- Little Busters (1998)
- Runners High (1999)
- Happy Bivouac (1999)
- Smile (2001)
- Thank You, My Twilight (2002)
- Penalty Life (2003)
- Good Dreams (2004)
- My Foot (2006)
- Wake Up! Wake Up! Wake Up! (2007)
- Pied Piper (2008)
- OOPArts (2009)
- Horn Again (2011)
- Trial (2012)
- Moondust (2014)
- Stroll and Roll (2016)
- Nook in the Brain (2017)
- Rebroadcast (2018)

Compilations

- Fool on the Planet (2001)
- Another Morning, Another Pillows (2002)
- 90's My Life Returns (2004)
- Lostman Go to Yesterday (2007)
- Rock Stock & Too Smoking the Pillows (2009)
- Once Upon a Time in the Pillows (2009)
- Bootleg the Pillows 1992-1993 (2014)
- Across the Metropolis (2016)
