= FLCL =

Anime series directed by Kazuya Tsurumaki

- Promotional artwork used on a number of DVD releases of FLCL featuring the three primary characters from the first anime, from top, Canti (the blue robot), Haruko, and Naota.

フリクリ (Furikuri)
- Genre: Comedy; Science fiction; Surrealism
- Created by: FLCL; Gainax (Note: Original Work (原作)); Kazuya Tsurumaki (Note: Original Plan (原案)); FLCL Progressive / Alternative / Grunge / Shoegaze; Production I.G
- Original video animation
- Directed by: Kazuya Tsurumaki
- Produced by: Masatomo Nishizawa; Hiroki Satou; Masanobu Satou (#1–4); Hirotaka Takase (#5–6)
- Written by: Yōji Enokido
- Music by: Shinkichi Mitsumune; The Pillows
- Studio: Gainax; Production I.G
- Licensed by: Crunchyroll (Note: In North America through Crunchyroll (formerly known as Funimation) and in Australia through Crunchyroll Store Australia (formerly known as Madman Anime).)
- Released: April 26, 2000 – March 16, 2001
- Runtime: 23–31 minutes
- Episodes: 6
- Manga
- Illustrated by: Hajime Ueda
- Published by: Kodansha
- English publisher: NA: Dark Horse Comics
- Magazine: Magazine Z
- Original run: December 25, 1999 – March 26, 2001
- Volumes: 2
- Novel series
- Written by: Yōji Enokido
- Illustrated by: Kazuya Tsurumaki; Hiroyuki Imaishi
- Published by: Kadokawa Shoten
- English publisher: NA: Tokyopop
- Imprint: Kadokawa Sneaker Bunko
- Original run: June 1, 2000 – March 1, 2001
- Volumes: 3
Further information
Anime television series
FLCL Progressive
Directed by	Katsuyuki Motohiro (chief); Kazuto Arai (#1); Toshihisa Kaiya (#2); Yuki Ogawa (#3); Yoshihide Ibata (#4); Kei Suezawa (#5); Hiroshi Ikehata (#6)
Produced by	Maki Terashima-Furuta; Mike Lazzo; Masaya Saito
Written by	Hideto Iwai
Music by	R.O.N
Studio	Production I.G (#1, 3–4, 6); Production GoodBook (#2); Signal.MD (#5)
Licensed by	The Cartoon Network, Inc.
English network	US: Adult Swim (Toonami)
Original run	June 3, 2018 – July 7, 2018
Episodes	6
Anime television series
FLCL Alternative
Directed by	Katsuyuki Motohiro (chief); Yutaka Uemura
Produced by	Maki Terashima-Furuta; Mike Lazzo; Masaya Saito
Written by	Hideto Iwai
Music by	R.O.N
Studio	Production I.G; NUT (#1, 4, 6); Revoroot (#2–3, 5)
Licensed by	The Cartoon Network, Inc.
English network	US: Adult Swim (Toonami)
Original run	April 1, 2018 (April Fools' Day airing); September 8, 2018 – October 13, 2018
Episodes	6
Anime film series
FLCL Alternative: The Movie; FLCL Progressive: The Movie
Directed by	Katsuyuki Motohiro (chief); Yutaka Uemura (Alternative)
Produced by	Maki Terashima-Furuta; Mike Lazzo; Masaya Saito
Written by	Hideto Iwai
Music by	R.O.N
Studio	Production I.G; NUT (Alternative); Revoroot (Alternative); Production GoodBook (Progressive); Signal.MD (Progressive)
Released	September 7, 2018 (Alternative); September 28, 2018 (Progressive)
Runtime	135 minutes (Alternative); 136 minutes (Progressive)
Anime television series
FLCL: Grunge
Directed by	Hitoshi Takekiyo
Produced by	Maki Terashima-Furuta
Written by	Tetsuhiro Ideka
Music by	The Pillows; Sawao Yamanaka
Studio	MontBlanc Pictures
Licensed by	The Cartoon Network, Inc.
English network	CA: Adult Swim; US: Adult Swim (Toonami)
Original run	September 10, 2023 – September 24, 2023
Episodes	3
Anime television series
FLCL: Shoegaze
Directed by	Yutaka Uemura
Produced by	Maki Terashima-Furuta
Written by	Kenta Ihara
Music by	The Pillows; Sawao Yamanaka
Studio	NUT
Licensed by	The Cartoon Network, Inc.
English network	CA: Adult Swim; US: Adult Swim (Toonami)
Original run	October 1, 2023 – October 15, 2023
Episodes	3

FLCL (Japanese: フリクリ, Hepburn: Furikuri; pronounced in English as Foolycooly) is a Japanese anime series created and directed by Kazuya Tsurumaki, written by Yōji Enokido, and produced by the FLCL Production Committee, which consisted of Gainax, Production I.G, and King Records. The series tells the adventures of the eccentric, hyperactive alien Haruko Haruhara and her various conflicts on Earth against the intergalactic megalomaniacal corporation Medical Mechanica, often wreaking mass destruction in the process and disrupting the lives of the people she encounters.

The original FLCL series was released as an original video animation (OVA) series, and follows Naota Nandaba, a taciturn twelve-year-old boy whose suburban life and obsession with seeming adult is disturbed by Haruko's appearance. The six-episode series was released in Japan from April 2000 to March 2001 alongside a manga and novel adaptation.

In 2016, two new seasons totaling 12 episodes were announced as a co-production between Production I.G, Toho, and Adult Swim. The second season, FLCL Progressive, premiered on June 3, 2018, on Adult Swim's Toonami programming block, while the third season, FLCL Alternative, premiered on September 8, 2018. In Japan, Alternative and Progressive had theatrical screenings as compilation films with Alternative opening on September 7, 2018, and Progressive opening on September 28, 2018. The first episode of FLCL Alternative premiered unannounced on April Fools' Day 2018 at 12 a.m. ET on Toonami in Japanese with English subtitles as part of Adult Swim's annual stunt. Two additional seasons were ordered by Adult Swim in 2022, titled FLCL: Grunge and FLCL: Shoegaze, respectively. Both seasons premiered in North America in 2023.

== Plot ==
=== Season 1 ===
The first season of FLCL is a coming-of-age story that revolves around Naota Nandaba, a 12-year-old, working-class boy living with his widower father and grandfather. His life in the Japanese city of Mabase is interrupted by the arrival of a Vespa-riding maniac named Haruko Haruhara. She runs over Naota then revives him with CPR before hitting him on the head with her left-handed, electric bass guitar (a blue, vintage Rickenbacker 4001) and proceeds to stalk him. Finding Haruko weaseling her way into his life as a live-in maid, Naota discovers that the head injury she caused created an "N.O." portal, from which giant robots produced by a company known as Medical Mechanica emerge periodically. The first of these robots is hit on the head by Haruko and becomes a friendly service robot later named Canti. While fighting robots sent after him, Canti ingests Naota and assumes the reddened form he first had.

Claiming she is an alien investigator from the Galactic Space Police Brotherhood, Haruko's presence places Naota and those around him in danger. The Interstellar Immigration Bureau's Commander Amarao, whom Haruko has a history with, asserts instead that she is an apathetic seductress seeking a space-manipulating being called Atomsk who was partially contained within Canti. Every time Naota is absorbed by Canti, Atomsk is gradually brought to Earth. As Atomsk is held in Medical Mechanica's custody and Haruko ultimately places Earth under threat, the company eventually turns their factory stationed on the planet into a doomsday terraforming device, attempting to have Naota and Canti absorbed by the doomsday device's Terminal Core. Haruko's plan fails as Naota ends up becoming Atomsk's host and then releases him into the universe after a brief battle that ends Medical Mechanica's attack on Earth. Haruko follows after Atomsk, and Mabase returns to some normalcy.

=== Progressive ===
Haruko returns to Earth many years after her failed attempt to contain Atomsk in the first season, although she did manage to absorb him sometime in between these events. Placing herself as a middle school homeroom teacher, Haruko targets a 14-year-old girl named Hidomi Hibajiri through her classmate and eventual love interest Ko Ide. Haruko finds opposition in both the headphones Hidomi wears and Julia Jinyu, a more stoic offshoot of Haruko that splintered from her during her initial attempt to control Atomsk's power. Haruko eventually eats Julia to restore herself, and uses Ide to get to Hidomi. Like before, this causes conflict between Medical Mechanica and the Interstellar Immigration Bureau, as the latter was reverse-engineering Canti's technology to utilize the N.O. channel's energies for their own use. Atomsk appears on Earth as planned, but Haruko ends up failing again with a freed Julia taking her leave. Haruko regains her composure and is finally convinced to give up her obsession over Atomsk as completely unrequited, as Hidomi and Ide begin their relationship while Mabase rebuilds after much of it was destroyed by Medical Mechanica.

=== Alternative ===
Haruko enters the life of high school student Kana Koumoto and her friends as she became a mentor of sorts to Kana in helping the teen's transition into adulthood as Medical Mechanica begins its assault on Earth. While helping Kana resolve some issues as one of her friends leaves for Mars, Haruko ends up on another planet as a direct result of Kana's reverse N.O. portal that they used to transport Medical Mechanica's plants off the planet. The season is speculated to take place before the events of all the other seasons. This comes from a tweet made by Creative Director at Adult Swim Jason Demarco, who said FLCL Alternative was "designed to be a prequel to the original..."

=== Grunge ===
Haruko manipulates the mob-run town of Okura in a scheme to infect Medical Mechanica with a virus and steal Atomsk from them. In the process, she influences the lives of three working kids: Shinpachi, Shonari and Orinoko, before taking off after Atomsk on top of Medical Mechanica's plant. The season takes place between the events of Shoegaze and the first season.

=== Shoegaze ===
Masaki is a teenager who sees ghosts that nobody else can see, including a large ghost bird perched atop a tower. Harumi joins him in exploring the tower after it is locked down by the Bureau of Interstellar Immigration. Kana Koumoto (from the third season) is now a 27-year-old adult working for the bureau and is called in to assist in getting the teenagers out. After setting off an explosion, the teenagers find that the tower extends into N.O. space. The bureau chief admits that the purpose of the tower is to reconnect the dimension they are currently in with a separate one that split away 10 years ago and he hopes that with enough emotional turmoil he can get Masaki to trigger the N.O. device and merge them back together. After Harumi is shot and Masaki realizes that he loves her, his N.O. field begins the merger in which Harumi realizes that she is actually from the other dimension, a colony on Mars. As Masaki calms, the merger fails, and a large snake-like entity appears. In the closing credits, Masaki is able to jump dimensions through N.O. space to visit the Mars colony. He explains that the worm-creature helps him do so and its name is Atomsk.

== Production ==
The first season of FLCL was directed by Kazuya Tsurumaki and produced by the FLCL Production Committee, which included Gainax, Production I.G, and Starchild Records.

Tsurumaki has said that he tried to "break the rules" of anime when making FLCL, for example, by choosing a contemporary Japanese band to provide the soundtrack, and patterning the style more after "a Japanese TV commercial or promotional video", creating a work that is "short, but dense-packed".

FLCL's localization director and script writer Marc Handler stated that localization of the script was the hardest part of the show. The in-jokes in the show included obscure pop culture references that had to be decoded and transferred to English audiences. One example was a reference to Cheerio, a discontinued soft drink in Japan, for the English release the choice was made to use a discontinued American soft drink at the time, Crystal Pepsi. Director Kazuya Tsurumaki responded to criticism of FLCL, stating "comprehension should not be an important factor in FLCL".

The Medical Mechanica building featured is in the shape of a large iron. The character Amarao describes Medical Mechanica's goal as the destruction of all thought. FLCL uses the iron as a symbolic breakdown of "thought" by smoothing out the wrinkles as equated to the removing of the brain's wrinkles. For English localization, the Japanese team had to explain the concept because a direct translation of script did not convey the ideology.

== Media ==
=== Original video animation ===
The six-episode series was released in Japan from April 26, 2000 – March 16, 2001. It originally debuted in the United States on Adult Swim in August 2003, where it managed to gain a significant cult following and was widely acclaimed, despite its short length. The series would continue to air on the network in the following years, including reruns on the network's Toonami programming block from October 2013 to January 2014, and in April 2018 (to promote the then-upcoming release of Progressive and Alternative). The series is also available via iTunes, adultswim.com and Funimation's website.

Six DVD compilations, each containing one episode, have been released in Japan by Gainax. In addition, a DVD collection box, containing all six DVD compilations, was released in Japan on August 13, 2005. Three DVD compilations were released by Synch-Point in North America. A DVD collection box, containing all the DVD compilations of the English episodes, was released on January 23, 2007, but have since gone out of print. In January 2010, Funimation announced that they had acquired the license for the series and would be releasing it on DVD and Blu-ray Disc in February 2011. Shortly after, it has been released in Australia and New Zealand by Madman Entertainment on a 3-disc DVD set and on Blu-ray Disc. It is also licensed in the United Kingdom by MVM Films. The series also aired in the United States on Cartoon Network's Adult Swim programming block from August 4 to August 13, 2003.

=== Novels ===
A three-volume novel series adaptation was written by the anime's screenwriter, Yoji Enokido, illustrated by Kazuya Tsurumaki and Hiroyuki Imaishi, and published by Kadokawa Shoten. The novels were released in Japan in June 2000, October 2000, and March 2001 respectively. The English-language versions were published by Tokyopop and were released in North America on March 11, 2008; September 9, 2008; and March 10, 2009, respectively. The novels cover all 6 episodes of the anime, introducing elements that were not present in the original production.

No.	Original release date	Original ISBN	English release date	English ISBN
1	June 1, 2000	4-04-423601-1	March 11, 2008	978-1-427-80498-3
2	October 1, 2000	4-04-423602-X	September 9, 2008	978-1-427-80499-0
3	March 1, 2001	4-04-423603-8	March 10, 2009	978-1-427-80500-3

=== Manga ===
A two-volume manga adaptation was created by artist Hajime Ueda. The manga interprets the series with certain elements altered and removed, and tells the events of the anime using a reductive art style and unsteady pacing. Jack Kotin defended the unique artstyle of the manga, saying "It can be crudely drawn at times, but this style fits in well with the overall story and atmosphere...".

The manga was published by Kodansha and serialized in monthly Magazine Z from December 25, 1999, to March 26, 2001. The two volumes were released on October 23, 2000, and August 23, 2001, respectively. The manga was re-released in bunkoban format with the two volumes labeled "Jō" (上, First) and "Ge" (下, Final) in two individual box sets titled "Kodansha Box". Jō volume was on May 7, 2007, and the Ge volume was released on June 4, 2007. An edited tankōbon version of the manga that was released in box sets, were released on January 10, 2012, and February 9, 2012, respectively.

The English-language editions of the manga was released by Tokyopop on September 16, 2003, and on November 4, 2003, respectively. In March 2011, Dark Horse Comics announced to re-release the manga in omnibus edition. The omnibus edition was released on May 16, 2012, and includes remastered story pages, a remastered script, and bonus color pages.

=== Soundtracks ===
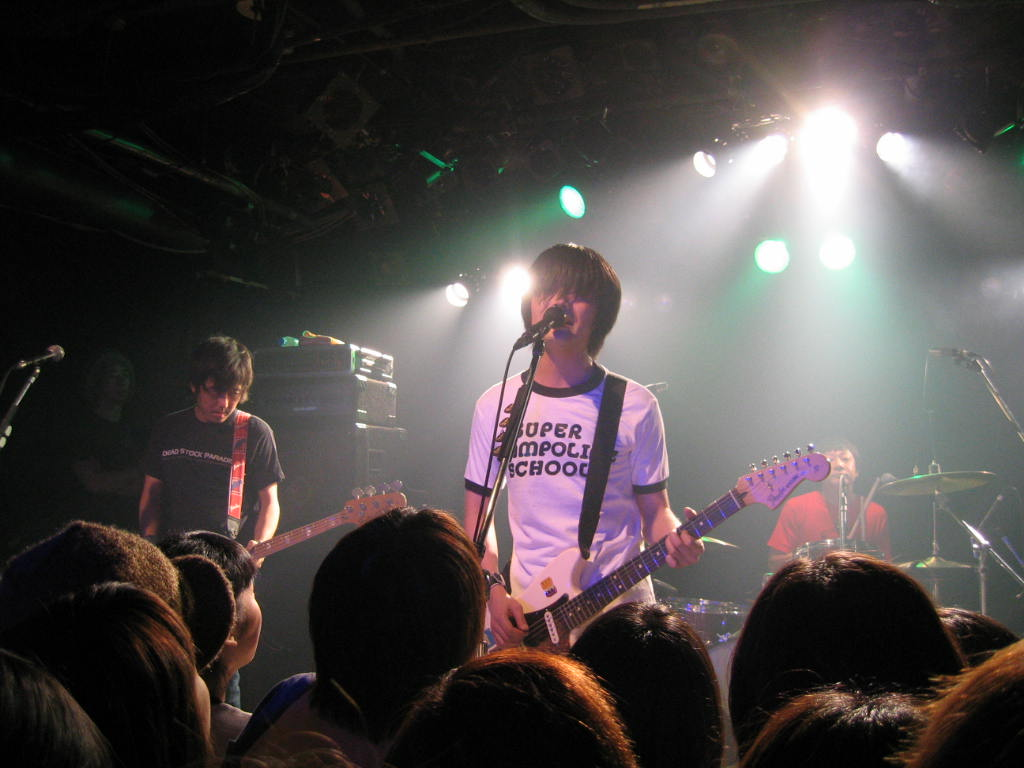
The Pillows in 2003

Six tracks of theme music are used for the episodes; five insert songs and one closing theme, all by Japanese rock band the Pillows. The battle themes are "Advice", "Little Busters" and "I Think I Can"; the opening themes are: "One Life", used in episode one, "Instant Music" in episodes two and three, "Happy Bivouac" in episode four, "Runners High", in episode five, and "Carnival" in episode six. The closing theme of each episode is "Ride on Shooting Star", the series' main theme song, used during ending sequences in which appears Yukiko Motoya and a Vespa.

Geneon Entertainment has released three original soundtracks encompassing the songs by the Pillows, and the score by composer Shinkichi Mitsumune. The first soundtrack, titled FLCL No.1: Addict (フリクリNo.1 アディクト), contains tracks featured in the first three episodes of FLCL. The soundtrack was released on October 4, 2000, in Japan and January 20, 2004, in the US. The second soundtrack, titled FLCL No.2: King of Pirates (フリクリNo.2 海賊王, Furi Kuri No.2 Kaizoku-ō), contains tracks featured in the last three episodes of FLCL. The soundtrack was released on July 25, 2001, in Japan and September 7, 2004, in the US. This volume features several audio dramas, with the cast of FLCL playing the various parts. Due to the dramas included, this album acts as a sequel of sorts to the anime. The third soundtrack, titled FLCL No.3 (フリクリNo.3), is a compilation of the first two soundtracks, featuring only music by the Pillows. The released on June 8, 2005, and June 7, 2005, in the US. Unlike the previous two soundtracks, the songs are the original vocal versions from the band's LPs. A fourth album title FooL on CooL generation (フールオンクールジェネレーション) was released in September 2018 with music used in Progressive and Alternative.

FLCL No.1 Addict
No.	Title	Arranged by	Length
1.	"Last Dinosaur"	The Pillows & Zin Yoshida, Jun Suzuki	0:23
2.	"Ride on Shooting Star"	The Pillows & Yoshida, Suzuki	2:21
3.	"Sad Sad Kiddie (Off Vocal Version)"	The Pillows & Tatsuya Kashima	2:04
4.	"Carnival (Off Vocal Version)"	The Pillows & Yoshida, Suzuki	1:37
5.	"Runners High ~FLCL Ver.~"	The Pillows & Kashima	1:38
6.	"Instant Music"	The Pillows & Kashima	3:16
7.	"Stalker (Off Vocal Version)"	The Pillows & Kashima	2:35
8.	"Rever’s Edge (B-6)"		2:49
9.	"Stalker Goes to Babylon"		4:03
10.	"One Life"	The Pillows & Kashima	4:08
11.	"Pain (A-7)"		2:42
12.	"Comedians' Galop from The Comedians by Kabalevsky" (listed as Kabalevsky from "Clown" ~ Gallop in the tracklist)" (Composed by Dmitri Borisovich Kabalevsky)		1:38
13.	"Hybrid Rainbow"	The Pillows & Kashima	3:58
14.	"Selfish-b (B-6)"		2:13
15.	"Pink (A-6)"		1:39
16.	"Beautiful Morning with You (Off Vocal Version)"	The Pillows & Yoshida, Suzuki	1:35
17.	"Sleepy Head (Off Vocal Version)"	The Pillows & Yoshida, Suzuki	1:04
18.	"Bran-New Lovesong (Off Vocal Version)"	The Pillows & Kashima	1:58
19.	"Come Down (Off Vocal Version)"	The Pillows & Yoshida, Suzuki	2:06
20.	"Advice ~FLCL Arrange Ver.~"	The Pillows & Yoshida, Suzuki	2:13
21.	"Little Busters"	The Pillows & Kashima	3:43
Total length:			49:42

FLCL No.2 King of Pirates
No.	Title	Arranged by	Length
1.	"Crazy Sunshine"	The Pillows & Zin Yoshida, Jun Suzuki	4:06
2.	"White Ash"	The Pillows	1:19
3.	"Taxi (Drama)"		10:00
4.	"Nightmare (Karaoke)"	The Pillows, Zin Yoshida, and Tatsuya Kashima	1:02
5.	"Patricia (Karaoke)"	The Pillows, Zin Yoshida, and Tatsuya Kashima	1:38
6.	"Memory of Summer"	Shinkichi Mitsumune	2:21
7.	"Blues Drive Monster"	The Pillows	3:25
8.	"Funny Bunny"	The Pillows, Zin Yoshida, Jun Suzuki, and Tatsuya Kashima.	3:37
9.	"Mamiko (Drama)"		3:04
10.	"Ohgiri (Drama)"		4:55
11.	"Harumi (Drama)"		1:51
12.	"High Risk"	Shinkichi Mitsumune	1:46
13.	"Weekend"	Shinkichi Mitsumune	2:37
14.	"Being Bitten (Drama)"		7:17
15.	"Another Morning"	The Pillows	4:36
16.	"Last Dinosaur"	The Pillows	3:44
17.	"I Think I Can"	The Pillows, Zin Yoshida, Jun Suzuki, and Tatsuya Kashima.	2:59
18.	"One Life" (hidden track)	The Pillows	4:10
Total length:			60:00

FLCL No.3
No.	Title	Arranged by	Length
1.	"Sad Sad Kiddie"	The Pillows	3:12
2.	"Sleepy Head"	The Pillows	3:02
3.	"I Think I Can"	The Pillows	3:00
4.	"Blues Drive Monster"	The Pillows	3:26
5.	"Carnival"	The Pillows	3:50
6.	"Come Down"	The Pillows	2:09
7.	"Crazy Sunshine"	The Pillows	4:08
8.	"Stalker"	The Pillows	2:37
9.	"Nightmare"	The Pillows	1:43
10.	"Funny Bunny"	The Pillows	3:37
11.	"Beautiful Morning With You"	The Pillows	5:43
12.	"Advice"	The Pillows	2:15
13.	"Runners High"	The Pillows	2:46
14.	"Hybrid Rainbow"	The Pillows	4:00
15.	"Little Busters"	The Pillows	3:46
16.	"Last Dinosaur"	The Pillows	3:46
17.	"Ride On Shooting Star"	The Pillows	2:22
Total length:			55:28

FooL on CooL generation
No.	Title	Arranged by	Length
1.	"Spiky Seeds"	The Pillows	3:07
2.	"I Think I Can"	The Pillows	3:00
3.	"The Third Eye"	The Pillows	3:58
4.	"My Foot"	The Pillows	4:58
5.	"You Stood There, Like an Angel"	The Pillows	3:12
6.	"Freebee Honey"	The Pillows	3:35
7.	"Non Fiction"	The Pillows	3:20
8.	"Fool on the Planet"	The Pillows	6:13
9.	"Last Dinosaur"	The Pillows	3:46
10.	"The Sun that Will Not Rise"	The Pillows	6:17
11.	"Thank You, my Twilight"	The Pillows	4:31
12.	"Star Overhead"	The Pillows	4:37
Total length:			50:34

== Reception and legacy ==
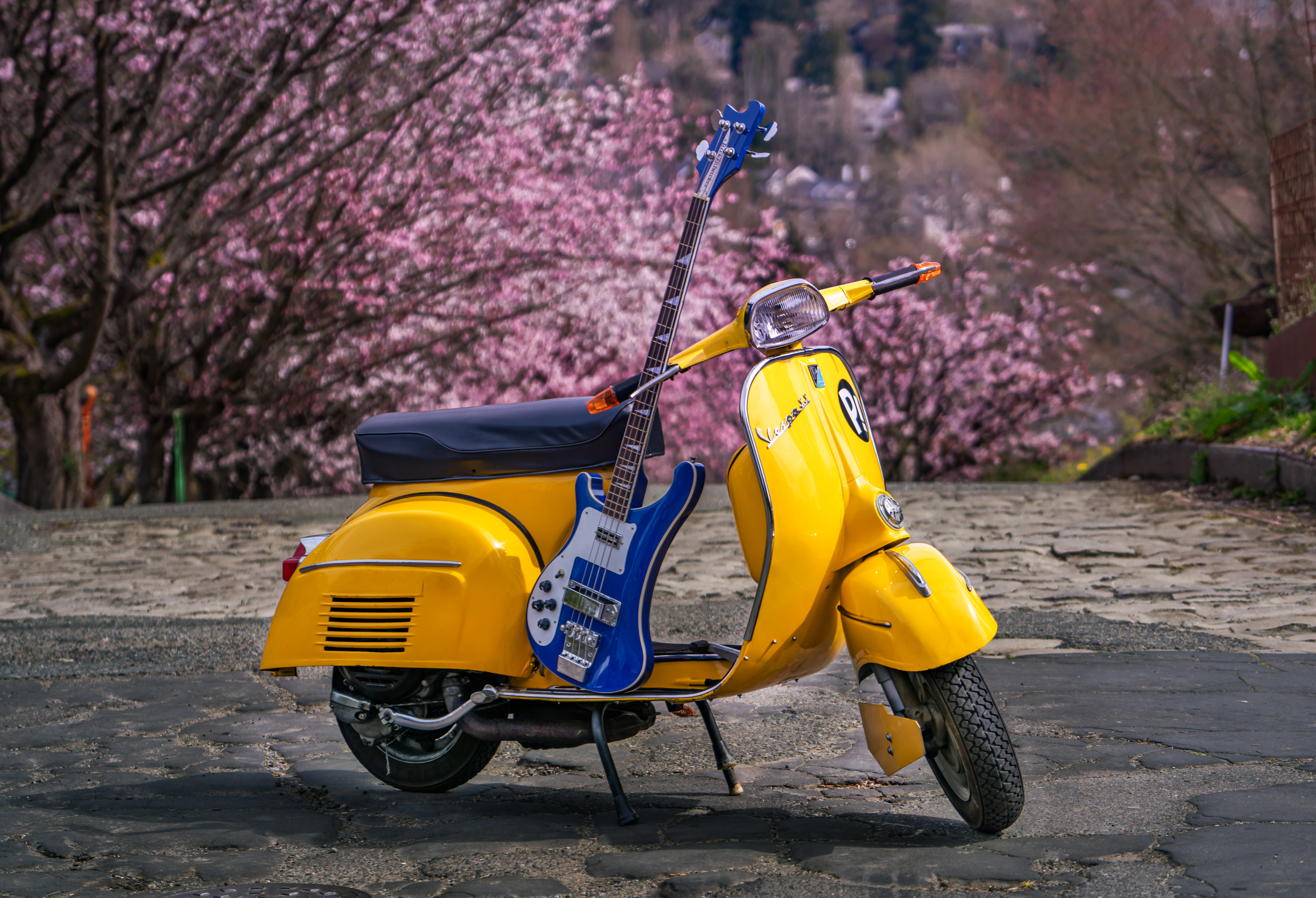
A real photograph of a 1965 Vespa Super Sport 180 moped and a left-handed Rickenbacker 4001 bass guitar, both of which are used by Haruko in the series.

P! emblem of Haruko's Vespa as can be seen in the series

FLCL has received a mostly positive reception. The series has been described as "bizarre" and "surreal", and has been noted for its symbolic content, unusual plot, and its soundtrack composed by the Pillows. Its experimental nature has also been noted, which includes an entire scene made in the cutout animation style of animated American series South Park, or The Matrix-like camera rotation tricks.

Christopher McDonald of Anime News Network called it "downright hilarious" and "visually superb" with great music, citing the packaging of 2 episodes per DVD as the only weakness of Synch-Point's original release. Robert Nelson of THEM Anime Reviews gave the anime 4 out of 5 stars, stating "FLCL may not have a straightforward or deep plot. It may not have complex characterizations. Hell, it may not have any meaning. But FLCL does succeed in its true objective. It is fun to watch!" Chris Beveridge of Mania gave it an A−, stating "FLCL is something that allowed those involved to try a wide variety of styles and techniques and does come off as quite experimental. But nearly everything worked in their favor and you end up with three hours of nearly break neck speed action, comedy and commentary on modern life." Brian Ruh praised the series, stating "It was very frenetic and kept pushing the envelope on what was possible in Japanese animation."

IGN columnist David Smith reviewed the anime shortly after its English premiere. In the article, Smith praised the series' unusual story telling, extremely high quality animation and the soundtrack provided by the Pillows; rewarding the series a score of 9 out of 10 concluding, "Logic dictates that FLCL should be an undisciplined and unaffecting mess, given all the insanity that its creators are attempting to weld into a functioning whole. Yet while it's hard to explain exactly why, it works. It entertains me. At times, it makes me laugh; at times, it makes me a little misty-eyed; at times, it makes me want to scream and howl and light things on fire and break windows with baseball bats and yes, maybe even buy a Vespa. That's the kind of success that you just can't argue with."

From January 3 to February 7, 2012, Hayden Childs, of the online magazine The A.V. Club, composed a six-part weekly analysis and review of each FLCL episode in celebration of The Legend of Korra's then upcoming third season, a series that was heavily influenced by FLCL's animation style. In the article, Childs gave an extremely positive review of the series, understanding it as a surrealist inspired coming of age story, stating "For all of its wild and initially bewildering aspects, the major purpose of FLCL is the impressionistic and often naturalistic documentation of Naota's passage into maturity."

The Encyclopedia of Science Fiction described FLCL as an entertaining and influential anime OVA, distinguished by its surreal storytelling, hyperactive pacing and constantly shifting animation styles. It noted that the series' deliberately confusing narrative, which director Kazuya Tsurumaki considered less concerned with comprehension than with experience, nevertheless succeeds in keeping viewers engaged. The encyclopedia highlighted its unconventional visual techniques, including fourth wall breaks and sequences adopting the style of manga, alongside its often bizarre symbolism and humor. It also emphasized the series' exploration of adolescence, emotional maturity and the transition to adulthood through Naota's experiences, while noting that its frequent sexual imagery occasionally crosses into fan service.

Avatar: The Last Airbender director Giancarlo Volpe has stated members of his staff "were all ordered to buy FLCL and watch every single episode of it."

Chainsaw Man creator Tatsuki Fujimoto has stated in his 3 million copies sold thank you letter to fans that Chainsaw Man is a "wicked version of FLCL".

=== Awards and acclaims ===
On August 12, 2003, a Time Warner press release noted the success of Cartoon Network: FLCL "ranked No. 42 among all shows on ad-supported cable among adults 18–34". Also in 2003, FLCL won third place for Best Animation Film at the Fantasia Festival. On February 24, 2007, FLCL was nominated for "Best Cast", and won "Best Comedy Series" and "Best Short Series" at the first American Anime Awards show. Anime Insider ranked FLCL 4th in their list of the best English-licensed anime of all time in November 2007.

== Sequel seasons ==
On August 31, 2015, Anime News Network reported that Production I.G may have been planning a continuation or remake of the OVA series after announcing their acquisition of the rights to FLCL from production studio Gainax. According to Hideaki Anno, his animation studio Khara was originally set to buy the rights to FLCL from Gainax before Production I.G. However, before the deal was finalized Gainax suddenly raised the asking price causing the deal with Khara to fall though.

On March 24, 2016, via Toonami's official Facebook and Tumblr pages, it was announced that Cartoon Network's Adult Swim will produce 12 new episodes of FLCL in cooperation with Production I.G. The episodes were split into two individual seasons: FLCL Progressive (フリクリ プログレ, Furikuri Purogure; "FLCL Progress") and FLCL Alternative (フリクリ オルタナ, Furikuri Orutana; "FLCL Alterna") which served as sequels to the popular series, which was initially broadcast on Adult Swim in August 2003.

The synopsis of the first sequel season was published by Adult Swim:

In the new season of FLCL, many years have passed since Naota and Haruhara Haruko shared their adventure together. Meanwhile, the war between the two entities known as Medical Mechanica and Fraternity rages across the galaxy. Enter Hidomi, a young teenage girl who believes there is nothing amazing to expect from her average life, until one day when a new teacher named Haruko arrives at her school. Soon enough, Medical Mechanica is attacking her town and Hidomi discovers a secret within her that could save everyone, a secret that only Haruko can unlock. But why did Haruko return to Earth? What happened to her Rickenbacker 4001 she left with Naota? And where did the human-type robot 'Canti' go?

FLCL Progressive, the sequel series, featured the return of original character designer Yoshiyuki Sadamato (as his respective role) and original series creator Kazuya Tsurumaki, who supervised the project. Hideto Iwai wrote the scripts, and Katsuyuki Motohiro served as chief director on the project, with each episode featuring a different director: Kazuto Arai, Toshihisa Kaiya, Yuki Ogawa, Yoshihide Ibata, Kei Suezawa, and Hiroshi Ikehata. The animation was produced mostly by Production I.G, but studios Production GoodBook and Signal.MD handled episodes 2 and 5, respectively. The Pillows contributed to the series soundtrack, although the score was primarily composed by R・O・N from music production company VERYGOO.

FLCL Alternative, the third season, once again saw the return of character designer Yoshiyuki Sadamoto, composer R・O・N (with tracks by the Pillows), scriptwriter Hideto Iwai, and supervisor Kazuya Tsurumaki. Katsuyuki Motohiro, as well, returned as chief director, although Yutaka Uemara was the only director, and Kiyotaka Suzuki served as assistant director. Production I.G, Revoroot, and NUT produced the animation for the series.

FLCL Progressive premiered on June 3, 2018, on Adult Swim's Toonami programming block and concluded on July 7, 2018; FLCL Alternative premiered on September 8, 2018, and concluded on October 13, 2018. In Japan, Alternative and Progressive had theatrical screenings on September 7, 2018, and September 28, 2018, respectively. The first episode of FLCL Alternative unexpectedly premiered early at midnight on April Fools' Day on Toonami, airing entirely in Japanese with English subtitles. The day of the second season's US premiere, Toonami simultaneously announced via its Facebook page that they would be delaying the English subtitled versions of both new seasons until November 2018, in respect for the Japanese film format releases. Warner Bros. Home Entertainment released FLCL Progressive on DVD on October 1, 2019. It later released FLCL Alternative on DVD along with a Blu-ray combo pack of both sequels on February 4, 2020.

Two additional seasons were ordered by Adult Swim in 2022, which were announced on Toonami's 25th anniversary, titled FLCL Grunge (フリクリ グランジ, Furikuri Guranji; "FLCL Grunge") and FLCL Shoegaze (フリクリ シューゲイズ, Furikuri Shūgeizu; "FLCL Shoegaze"). Both seasons premiered in 2023. On October 7, 2023, it was announced there are no plans for further FLCL seasons.
