= Yoshiaki Manabe =

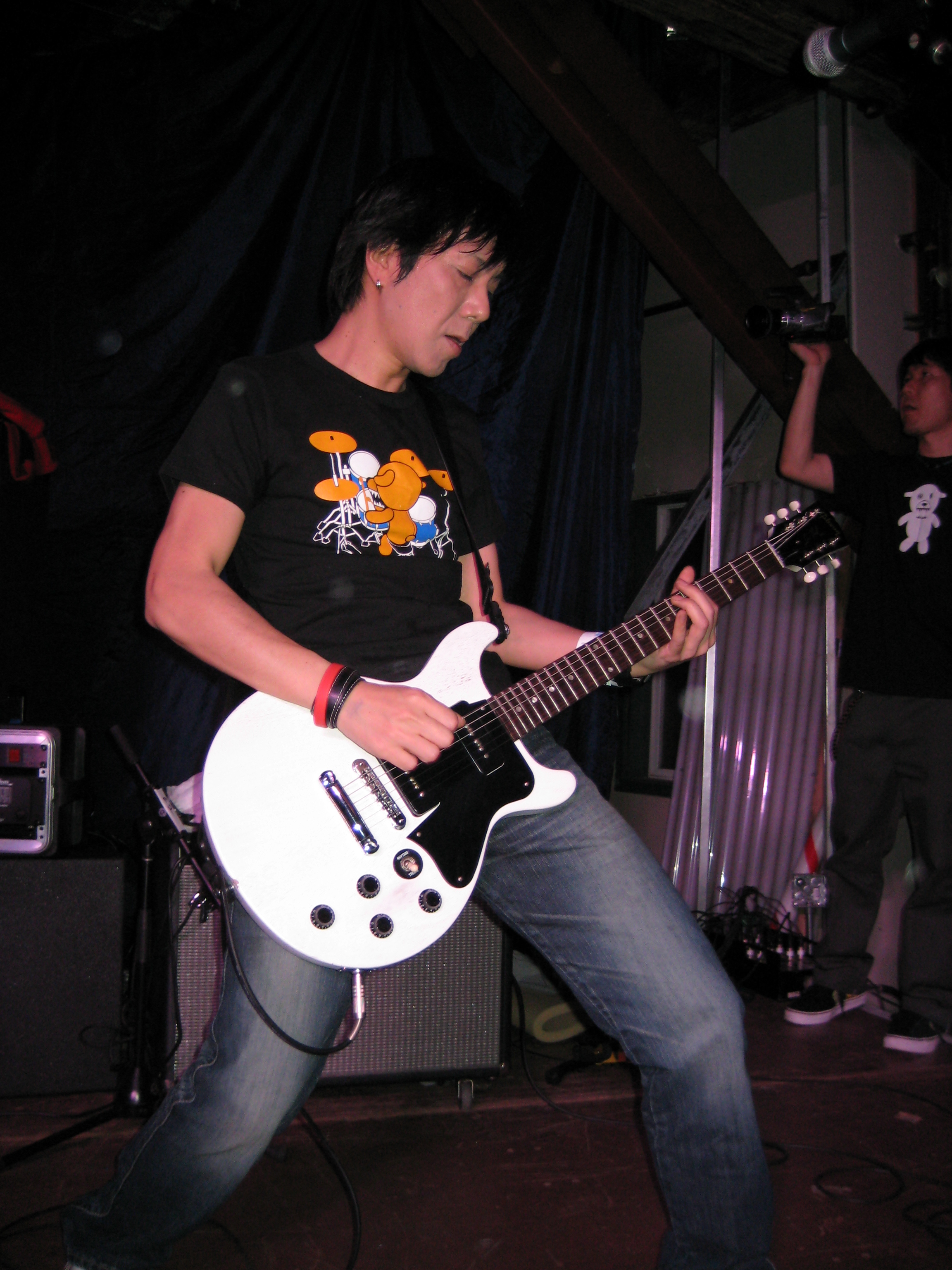
- Yoshiaki Manabe performing at Club Motor

Background information
- Birth name: Manabe Yoshiaki
- Born: October 2, 1962 (age 62)
- Genres: Alternative rock; punk rock; grunge; jazz; funk; reggae; pop rock
- Occupation: Musician
- Instrument: Guitar
- Years active: 1987 - present
- Website: www.pillows.jp

Yoshiaki Manabe (真鍋 吉明, Manabe Yoshiaki) is the lead guitarist for the Japanese rock band The Pillows. As a mixing engineer, Manabe has worked on albums by The Pillows and The Stereo Future. He enjoys reading in his free time and is an enormous fan of Bob Marley. He also has his own signature guitar made by Sago New Material Guitars.

== History ==
=== Life ===
Yoshiaki was born in Hokkaido Prefecture on October 2, 1962. He was affectionately known as "Pee-chan" because his friends commented that he looked like the cartoon character, Snoopy. He was in a band called PERSIA before joining The Pillows in 1989, then known as "Pisuke". Manabe is influenced by reggae legend Bob Marley, especially with his work in Nine Miles. He has said that he was influenced by reggae and some punk rock.

== Bands ==
=== Persia ===
Before starting in the Pillows, Manabe was a member of a rock band named PERSIA, which disbanded some time before The Pillows formed.

=== The Pillows ===
The Pillows (formed September 16 1989) are Manabe's primary and current band. Has been playing with them since the beginning and is an important part of the group. Aside from playing guitar, he also works on some of the mixing for the albums.

=== Nine Miles ===
Nine Miles is a solo project named after the town in which Bob Marley grew up in Jamaica. Manabe is in charge of everything (excluding some track mixing) and plays all instruments that are heard in the albums. Manabe is influenced by reggae legend Bob Marley to build his own unique reggae sound. Manabe's constant use of reverbs, electronic effects, horns, among others are what give him his incredibly unique sound. The arrangement of instruments only adds to the uniqueness.

=== Discography ===
==== Albums ====
- [2001.03.07] Solomonic Polar Bear
- [2003.08.06] Return of the Polar Bear
- [2008.01.30] Revolution is My Name
- [2012.11.14] Rutile

==== Compilations ====
- [2005.22.02] Go! Delicious Go! (Omnibus Album)

==== Covers by The Pillows ====
The single release by The Pillows (Nonfiction) contained a Nine Miles cover. Nonfiction contained a cover of the Nine Miles song HEART IS THERE.
