= Please Mr. Lostman =

Studio album by The Pillows
- Released: January 22, 1997
- Genre: power pop; jangle pop
- Length: 41:24
- Label: King Records; KICS-606
- Producer: Zin Yoshida

The Pillows chronology
Living Field (1995)	Please Mr. Lostman (1997)	Little Busters (1998)

Singles from Please Mr. Lostman
- 1. "Strange Chameleon" Released: June 21, 1996; 2. "Swanky Street" Released: August 21, 1996; 3. "Trip Dancer" Released: November 21, 1996; 4. "Kanojo wa Kyou" Released: March 5, 1997

Please Mr. Lostman is an album released by the Pillows on January 22, 1997. The albums title is a play on "Please Mr. Postman" by the Marvelettes.

== Overview ==
After having many slumps such as sluggish sales, the Pillows continued their musical exploration period, but from this work, the current style of the pillows was established and it became a breakthrough in their exploration period. Unlike KOOL SPICE and LIVING FIELD, which incorporated genres such as jazz and bossa nova, Please Mr.Lostman focused entirely on a relatively strong alternative rock style.

The lead single off the album, "Strange Chameleon," was a major rejection of the music and style that the pillows had built up to that point, likening themselves to "a failed chameleon that doesn't fit in with the colors of its surroundings" after failing to achieve popular music. The release of "Strange Chameleon" was half-heartedly forced in the midst of a confrontation between the members and King Records who opposed it. At the same time, it was an album of determination to stick to the music they believed in, no matter what the circumstances. Frontman Sawao Yamanaka recalled that: "At the latter half of the second movement, my feelings ended up being blended with dishonesty, and I also had gotten hurt feelings, it was like “there’s nothing outside of strange chameleon”. Of course there was severe opposition from [King Records], but by that time I had already entered the third movement. It was one man in the third movement of the pillows. It was the complete opposite of the previous movements. I wouldn’t listen to anyone’s opinion. I wouldn’t even budge one inch." Although the sales of Please Mr.Lostman did not change much from their previous albums, it broke the slump in the band's direction, and for a while, unified the musical direction of the band from here on out. "Strange Chameleon" would go on to gain heavy rotation on FM stations and gradually gained support. In addition, the unity among the members and staff who overcame adversity together became stronger.

"Swanky Street", "Strange Chameleon", and "TRIP DANCER" would later be included on the compilation album, Fool on the planet.

== Track listing ==
All tracks are written by Sawao Yamanaka.

No.	Title	Length
1.	"STALKER"	2:35
2.	"TRIP DANCER"	3:54
3.	"Moon is mine"	4:10
4.	"ICE PICK"	3:39
5.	"彼女は今日, (Kanojo wa Kyou,)"	5:16
6.	"ストレンジ カメレオン (Strange Chameleon)"	6:23
7.	"Swanky Street"	4:52
8.	"SUICIDE DIVING"	3:53
9.	"GIRLS DON'T CRY"	2:31
10.	"Please Mr.Lostman"	4:08

== Personnel ==
=== the pillows ===
- Sawao Yamanaka — Guitar, vocals
- Yoshiaki Manabe — Guitar
- Shinichiro Sato — drums

Additional musicians

- Tatsuya Kashima - Bass
