= Moon Gold =

Studio album by The Pillows
- Released: June 21, 1991
- Genre: Post-punk; new wave
- Length: 42:42
- Label: Pony Canyon; PCCA-00279

The Pillows chronology
90's My Life (1990)	Moon Gold (1991)	White Incarnation (1992)

Singles from Moon Gold
- 1. "Ame ni Utaeba" Released: May 21, 1991

Moon Gold is the debut studio album released by Japanese alternative rock band the Pillows, released on June 21, 1991.

== Track listing ==
1. "You Are" (キミがいる) – 4:02
2. "This Is My Fashion" – 2:36
3. "I Need Somebody" – 4:33
4. "Dear, My 'First' Step" – 5:00
5. "I Feels Like It's Gonna Rain" (雨が降ってきたような気がする) – 4:08
6. "If You Sing in the Rain" (雨にうたえば) – 4:44
7. "Kiss Me Baby" – 2:46
8. "I Want to Return There" (あそこへ帰りたい) – 3:18
9. "Hello Girl" (ハローガール) – 4:15
10. "Foreigner" – 3:20
11. "Want to Sleep For..." – 3:27
12. "Good-bye Third Planet" (さようなら第三惑星) – 5:18
