= Salon Music (band) =

Japanese band

- Also known as: Sector Ma
- Origin: Tokyo, Japan
- Genres: new wave; rock; alternative rock; indie pop
- Years active: 1980–present
- Labels: Canyon; Moon; Alfa Records; Trattoria Records; Polystar; Felicity
- Members: Hitomi Takenaka; Zin Yoshida
- Website: https://www.salonmusic.info/

Salon Music is a Japanese new wave/rock duo consisting of Hitomi Takenaka (竹中仁見) and Zin Yoshida (吉田仁). The group have released twelve studio albums between 1983 and 2011. As of 2020 their most recent album was Sleepless Sheep in 2011.

== Career ==
=== 1980 to 1986: The Mobile Suit Corporation and Canyon Records ===
Salon Music's recording career began in 1982 with "Hunting in Paris". An English-language post-punk song, it was released on a split single (with Lizard) to promote the compilation Tokyo Mobile Music 1 on the UK label The Mobile Suit Corporation. The label was set up by A&R men David Bates and David Claridge as a sub-label of Phonogram banner in 1982 with the intention of providing an outlet for music from other cultures.

The group subsequently signed to the Japanese Canyon record label and released their debut album My Girl Friday in 1983. The album included a rerecording of "Hunting in Paris". "Wrapped Up In Duet" and "Spending Silent Night" were featured in tie-in TV commercials for the Honda Ballade Sports CR-X. The self-produced album displays a late 70s American and British new wave influence, and featured guitar-led songs colored with keyboard arrangements. Guitarist/vocalist Zin Yoshida was the main songwriter.

La Paloma Show followed in 1984 and included a cover of Pink Floyd's "See Emily Play". The song was the first of many covers of British and American artists that would appear on their albums. The hard rock sound of "See Emily Play" was an anomaly on the heavily synthesized album. It was produced by Salon Music and Yellow Magic Orchestra member Yukihiro Takahashi (高橋幸宏). The songwriting was more equally split between Yoshida and keyboardist/vocalist Hidemi Takenaka.

Topless followed in 1985, a lower-priced 7 track mini-album, it was their last for Canyon Records. Apart from a compilation of previously unreleased early recordings in 1993 and a compilation of album tracks in 2003, Topless was the group's last release on Canyon records. It was produced by Yoshida alone and continues the synthesized sound of La Paloma Show. Salon Music's three albums for Canyon are notable for the large number of backing musicians that appear. Subsequent albums are the work of much smaller group of contributors.

=== 1987 to 1990 Moon Records and ZaZa Records ===
In 1987 the group returned with This is Salon Music on Tatsuro Yamashita's (山下達郎) Moon Records. Yoshida is again the main songwriter and vocalist. The album was almost entirely performed and recorded by Yoshida and Takenaka utilising drum machines, sequencers and overdubbing. On backing vocals they are joined on several tracks by Sparks vocalist Russell Mael .

O Boy, released in 1988, their second and last album on Moon Records. Recorded with a full live band, it employs a return to the late 70s new wave sound of their debut album. Sparks members Russell and Ron Mael appear in guest spots. Takenaka writes and sings the majority of the songs, Eddie and Sunshine provide lyrics for two songs, also notable is a duet cover of Soft Cell's "Say Hello, Wave Goodbye" with Russell Mael. The album also features Atsunobu Yakabe (矢壁篤信), Eddie Maelov (of Eddie and Sunshine, Nicholas Summer on drums, and Bravo Komatsu, Dick Beetham, and Hajime Okano (岡野一) on guitar.

In December 1988, Yoshida released the album Heat Me on Moon records. Credited to Quadraphonics, the album is a side project with Pink member Hajime Okano. Recorded over a seven year period and featuring some contributions by Takenaka, it displays a darker sound inspired by goth rock. A second house influenced Quadraphonics album Blood and Snow was released in 1990 on Kaoru Sasa's ZaZa/Alfa Records.

Psychic Ball, was released in 1990 on ZaZa/Alfa. A switch from alternative rock styles into acid-house, industrial and shoegaze sounds. Yoshida is once again the dominant songwriter and singer. An unusual cover of Jimi Hendrix's "Purple Haze" appears on the album. In the same year, the duo contributed the song "Sector Ma" to the Fab Gear compilation, using the alias Sector Ma.

=== 1990 to present: Trattoria Records and Felicity Records ===
From 1989 onwards, Yoshida balanced Salon Music with production work for other artists, most notably alternative rock groups Flipper's Guitar and The Pillows. Together with Takenaka, they championed and co-produced Flipper's Guitar's first album. This association with Keigo Oyamada aka Cornelius had a huge impact on the duo, as they sebsequently signed to Oyamada's Trattoria Records, a sub-label of Polystar Records. They subsequently record a string of albums for the label starting with M*A*S*H in 1995, followed by Chew it in a Bite (1996), Kelly's Duck (1997), Round Five Shaggy Bee (1999), and New World Record (2002). The sound of these albums is inspired by garage rock, shoegaze, krautrock and 60s pop. The duo are supported by drummer Mitsuhiro Asakura (朝倉光洋) on several albums. On these albums Takenaka became the de facto lead songwriter and singer.

The mid-90s saw the re-release of all of Salon Music's albums on CD. My Girl Friday, La Paloma Show were reissued with bonus tracks and new artwork. Topless, the two Moon records albums (This Is Salon Music and O Boy), and Psychic Ball were also released but with unaltered track listings and their original artwork. Apart from a single CD compilation of the Moon Records albums in 2002, and the appearance of the Canyon albums on streaming platforms, none of Salon Music's albums have been reissued since and are currently out of print.

The late 90s was a prolific time for the duo, Takenaka formed her own side-project Silver Fins with Asakura. They recorded Hollywood (1997) and Pigment (1998) for Vap/Umbrella records. They are best remembered for contributing the song "Waiting So Long" to the anime TV series Berserk in 1997. That same year Yoshida produced The Pillows breakthrough Please Mr. Lostman, the first of several successful albums he produced for the group.

In the early 2000s Keigo Oyamada's Trattoria label shutdown when he moved from Polystar to Warner Music. Salon Music entered a long period of inactivity, only resurfacing in 2011 with their most recent album Sleepless Sheep on Felicity Records.

== Band members ==
- Hitomi Takenaka - electronic drums, keyboards, programming, synthesizer, vocals
- Zin Yoshida - guitar, bass, synthesizer, vocals
- Mitsuhiro Asakura - drums

== Discography ==
The discography of Salon Music consists of eleven studio albums, one mini-album, four compilation albums, and eight singles.

Studio albums

- My Girl Friday (1983, Canyon)
- La Paloma Show (1984, Canyon)
- Topless (1985, Canyon) (mini-album)
- This is Salon Music (1987, Moon Records)
- O Boy (1988, Moon)
- Psychic Ball (1990, Alfa)
- M*A*S*H (1995, Trattoria, Polystar)
- Chew it in a Bite (1996, Trattoria, Polystar)
- Kelly's Duck (1997, Trattoria, Polystar)
- Round Five Shaggy Bee (1999, Trattoria, Polystar)
- New World Record (2002, Trattoria, Polystar)
- Sleepless Sheep (2011, Felicity)

Compilation albums

- Missing and Wishing 1980-1983 (1993, Pony Canyon)
- Girls at Our Tratt's Best! (1998, Trattoria, Polystar)
- This Is + O Boy (2002, EastWest Japan)
- Anthology (Salon Music Best) (2003, Pony Canyon)

Singles and EPs

- "Hunting on Paris" b/w "Sa Ka Ka" (1982) (UK only split single with Lizard)
- "Wrapped Up in Duet" b/w "Muscle Daughter" (July 1983)
- "Spending Silent Night" b/w "A Day Away" (January 1984)
- "Hunting on Paris (Long Version) b/w "That was the Parching Sun…" (May 1984) (12" single)
- "Paradise Lost (Bikini Mix)" b/w Voice from Tangier (Voiceless Tangier Mix) / "Behind My Picture" (November 1984) (12" single)
- "Muscle Daughter (Tokyo Mix)" b/w "Spending Silent Night" / "Wandering" (1985) (US only 12" single)
- Tiger Moth (June 1996) (EP)
- "Stompin' Wheel -Way Out-" b/w "School Lunch" (April 1997) (split single with Seagull Screaming Kiss Her Kiss Her)
