= Ora Tour =

2012 concert tour by Rita Ora

- Tour by Rita Ora
- Promotional poster for the tour
- Associated album: Ora
- Start date: 23 October 2012
- End date: 17 December 2012
- Legs: 1
- No. of shows: 6 in North America

Rita Ora concert chronology
- Ora Tour (2012); Radioactive Tour (2013)

The Ora Tour was the first concert tour by British singer Rita Ora, in support of her debut studio album, Ora (2012). The mini-concert tour started on 23 October 2012 in the Yost Theater in Santa Ana, and ended on 17 December 2012 in the Highline Ballroom in New York City.

== Opening acts ==
- Iggy Azalea
- Havana Brown

== Setlist ==
This set list is representative of the show on October 24, 2012. It does not represent all concerts for the duration of the tour.

1. "Facemelt"
2. "Roc the Life"
3. "Fall in Love"
4. "Shine Ya Light"
5. "Swim Good"
6. "How We Do (Party)"
7. "Radioactive"
8. "R.I.P."
9. "Uneasy"

== Tour dates ==
List of concerts, showing date, city, country and venue
| Date | City | Country | Venue |
North America
| October 23, 2012 | Santa Ana | United States | Yost Theater |
| October 24, 2012 | San Francisco | United States | Regency Ballroom |
| October 26, 2012 | Chicago | United States | The Mid |
| December 15, 2012 | Lake Buena Vista | United States | House of Blues |
| December 16, 2012 | Detroit | United States | The Fillmore Detroit |
| December 17, 2012 (Note: The December 17, 2012 concert in New York City was originally planned to take place on October 30, but was rescheduled to December 17 due to Hurricane Sandy.) | New York City | United States | Highline Ballroom |
