= Turn Back =

Turn Back may refer to:

- Turn Back (album), a 1981 album by Toto, or the title track
- Turn Back (EP), a 2004 EP by The Pillows
- "Turn Back" (song), a 2012 song by K Koke
