= I Will Never Let You Down =

2014 single by Rita Ora

Single by Rita Ora
- Released: 31 March 2014
- Genre: Pop, dance
- Length: 3:23
- Label: Columbia; Roc Nation
- Songwriter: Calvin Harris
- Producer: Calvin Harris

Rita Ora singles chronology
"Lay Down Your Weapons" (2013)	"I Will Never Let You Down" (2014)	"Black Widow" (2014)

Music video
- "I Will Never Let You Down" on YouTube

"I Will Never Let You Down" is a song by British singer Rita Ora. Written and produced by Scottish DJ & producer Calvin Harris, the song was released as a single for digital download and streaming by Columbia and Roc Nation in various countries on 31 March 2014. The upbeat pop love song with dance and EDM influences opens with a hip hop beat and transitions into a disco and dance party. The singer conveys an empowering and optimistic message through her lyrics as she promises her love interest that she will never let him down. Upon its release, the song received critical acclaim from music critics, many of whom applauded the song's music, sound and lyrics as well as Ora's vocal delivery.

"I Will Never Let You Down" reached the number one position in the United Kingdom, becoming Ora's fourth number-one single on the UK Singles Chart. It further entered the top 50 in 15 other countries, including Australia, the Commonwealth of Independent States (CIS), Germany, Ireland, New Zealand and Switzerland. The song also reached number 77 on the US Billboard Hot 100 and number one on the Dance Club Songs chart as well as number 62 on the Canadian Hot 100. The song received gold certifications in four countries as well as platinum from the Australian Recording Industry Association (ARIA) in Australia, and double platinum from the British Phonographic Industry (BPI) in the UK.

The official music video for "I Will Never Let You Down", containing sequences of Ora depicted in several settings that alternate between black-and-white and colour shots, premiered on Ora's YouTube channel on 31 March 2014. The video attracted praise for its theme as well as Ora's appearance, fashion and clothes. To further promote the song, the singer performed it at a number of televised events, among others at the Bambi Awards, BBC Radio 1's Big Weekend, Germany's Next Topmodel and The Tonight Show Starring Jimmy Fallon.

== Background and composition ==
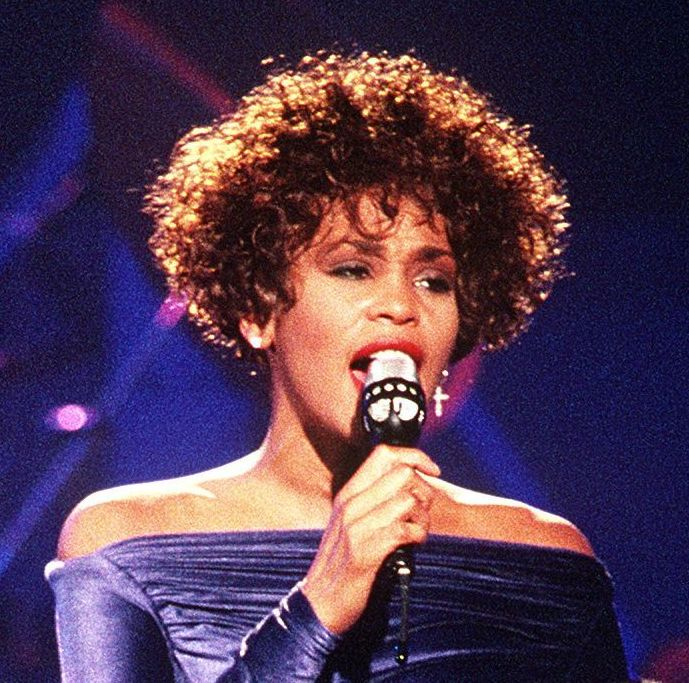
"I Will Never Let You Down" was created by Calvin Harris. When he wrote the song, Harris was inspired by American singer Whitney Houston.

Prior to its release, Ora started to tease "I Will Never Let You Down" in mid-March 2014, uploading the single's cover art and a preview of the music video. The song was written by Scottish disc jockey Calvin Harris and intended for her second studio album. Produced and written by him, Harris explained that the song was reminiscent of American singer Whitney Houston and singer Pink. Ora further stated, "I'm in a very good place and I really wanted people to see how I felt and how I want other people to feel when they listen to it – happy!" The album was scheduled to be released in the summer of 2014 but was postponed. In her 2015 lawsuit against Roc Nation, Ora stated that the record label had delayed her second album.

"I Will Never Let You Down" was released as a single for digital download and streaming by Columbia and Roc Nation on 31 March 2014. Ora's vocals in the song span from a low note of B_{3} to a high note of E_{5}. It was composed in 4/4 time and the key of E major with a tempo of 128 beats per minute and a chord progression of E–B–Cm-Gm-A. Musically, "I Will Never Let You Down" is an upbeat 80's-sounding pop love song, incorporating a dance production and EDM elements. The song begins with an intro utilising guitars and synths as well as hip hop beats, which progresses into a disco and dance-described party. Featuring an empowering and optimistic message, Ora lyrically promises her love interest that she will never let him down even when he feels like giving up. On the chorus, she sings, "When you're feeling low on love / I'll be what you're dreaming of / Oh, oh, I will never let you down."

== Reception ==
Upon release, "I Will Never Let You Down" was met with critical acclaim from music critics. Writing for Teen Vogue, Phillip Picardi proclaimed the song as "the feel-good anthem you need to cure your Monday blues", while Casey Lewis of the same magazine felt that "[it] is one of those tracks that makes an enormous head-bobbin', toe-tappin' impression just a few seconds in, and then halfway through you already can't wait to start it over again". While Devin from Rap-Up characterised the song as "uplifting", Matthew Anness for Urbanology named the song as "radio-friendly". Jason Lipshutz of Billboard complimented the song as a "stylish spring jam", labelling it a "contented grin of a single". Lindsey Weber from Vulture commended the song as "extremely catchy", writing that one should "beware of [an] earworm". Liza Darwin for Nylon elaborated, "if your Monday is in dire need of a dance party, then Rita Ora is here to help." Kelsey McKinney of Vox stated that "it showcases her voice better and gives a slower take on her skills between ['How We Do (Party)' 2012] and ['Black Widow' 2014]". Renowned for Sound's David Whiteway further highlighted the collaboration between Ora and Harris, concluding that "[she] isn't shying away from that fact that she has and intends to continue to develop [...] Ora has definitely found clarity and direction."

"I Will Never Let You Down" debuted at number one on the UK Singles Chart issue dated 24 May 2014, marking Ora's fourth chart-topping single in the United Kingdom, after her 2012 singles "Hot Right Now", "How We Do (Party)" and "R.I.P.". In 2016, the song received a platinum certification from the British Phonographic Industry (BPI) for shifting more than 1,000,000 units in the UK. It further topped the Scottish Singles Chart and reached the top 10 on the Irish Singles Chart. Elsewhere in Europe, the song reached number 12 in Switzerland, number 15 in Austria, number 18 in Romania, number 23 in Germany, and number 79 in Italy. It further earned gold certifications by the Bundesverband Musikindustrie (BVMI) in Germany, Federazione Industria Musicale Italiana (FIMI) in Italy and IFPI Danmark in Denmark. In Australia, "I Will Never Let You Down" peaked at number five on the ARIA Singles Chart and reached number nine on the New Zealand Singles Chart in New Zealand. The song attained a platinum certification from the Recorded Music New Zealand (RMNZ) in New Zealand and from the Australian Recording Industry Association (ARIA) in Australia for selling more than 15,000 and 70,000 units, respectively. In the United States, "I Will Never Let You Down" entered the US Billboard Hot 100 at number 99 and rose to number 77 on 6 September 2014. The song also topped the Dance Club Songs chart and reached number 22 on the Mainstream Top 40 ranking. In Canada, the song peaked at number 62 on the Canadian Hot 100 issue dated 30 August 2014 and entered the top 50 on the CHR/Top 40 and Hot AC, respectively.

== Promotion ==
The music video for "I Will Never Let You Down" was uploaded to Ora's official YouTube channel on 31 March 2014. Behind-the-scenes footage from various stages of filming the video was published on the platform on 16 April. Taking place in Los Angeles, the three-minute and 27-second video was directed by Italian director Francesco Carrozzini and displays several sequences of Ora, alternating between black-and-white and color segments. The attires worn by the singer in the video included designs by Adidas, Chanel, Hervé Leger and Moschino. The video opens with a sequence of a camera panning over several black-and-white photographs of Ora in a vessel filled with water. The camera then focuses on one of the photographs, which starts to transform into an animated picture, displaying the singer singing in a darkly lit surrounding. Next, a close-up segment shows her in an outdoor-setting walking and dancing in the camera's direction, before being accompanied by two backup dancers Polly and Sophie Duniam. Both black-and-white and colorful sequences of Ora are interspersed throughout the video, with her dancing in the aforementioned settings, in front of a pink setting and in a bright hallway.

Edwin Oritz from Complex labeled the video as "sweet and sexy", writing that "[it] show[s] off [Ora's] playful side". Christina Garibaldi for MTV noted the video's '80s theme, feeling "like a high-fashion photo shoot as it fully encompasses the fun vibe of the song". Marissa G. Muller of the latter publication commended Ora's "killer" clothes, commenting: "We're left wanting to see more, which—hey—is the mark of a great video." Lewis from Teen Vogue described the video as a "masterpiece on its own", applauding the singer's appearance and fashion as a "'90s extravagance". Lipshutz for Billboard likewise praised her presence in the video, adding that "[it] re-imagines the carefree rabble-rouser from the 'How We Do (Party)' clip as an elegant model".

Ora performed "I Will Never Let You Down" for the first time in the first season of the American talk show The Tonight Show Starring Jimmy Fallon on 22 April 2014. In May, the singer appeared to perform the song at the ninth season final of German reality show Germany's Next Topmodel as well as at BBC Radio 1's Big Weekend in Glasgow. On 24 June 2014, she performed at Capital's Summertime Ball in London and finished her performance with it. On 12 November 2015, Ora sang the song as a medley with her single "Body on Me" (2015) at the Bambi Awards in Berlin. Other performances of it took place at the Summertime Ball in 2015, 2018 and 2019 as well as at the Jingle Bell Ball in 2017, 2018 and 2019. Several remixes, including ones done by Digital Dog, Gregor Salto, R3hab and WestFunk, accompanied the single's release on 11 May. Ahead of the 2014 FIFA World Cup, another remix of "I Will Never Let You Down" created by English songwriter Switch followed on 10 June, as part of American company Pepsi's compilation album Pepsi Beats of the Beautiful Game.

== Track listing ==
- Digital download and streaming
1. "I Will Never Let You Down" – 3:23
- Digital download and streaming – Remixes
1. "I Will Never Let You Down" (R3hab Remix) – 4:11
2. "I Will Never Let You Down" (Gregor Salto Vegas Remix) – 6:17
3. "I Will Never Let You Down" (Gregor Salto Radio Remix) – 3:41
4. "I Will Never Let You Down" (Gregor Salto Radio Instrumental) – 3:42
5. "I Will Never Let You Down" (Steve Smart and WestFunk Club Mix) – 4:51
6. "I Will Never Let You Down" (Steve Smart and WestFunk Radio Edit) – 3:08
7. "I Will Never Let You Down" (DJ Escape and Tony Coluccio Main Mix) – 7:41
8. "I Will Never Let You Down" (DJ Escape and Tony Coluccio Radio Mix) – 4:38
9. "I Will Never Let You Down" (DJ Escape and Tony Coluccio Dub) – 6:41
10. "I Will Never Let You Down" (Digital Dog Remix) – 5:52
11. "I Will Never Let You Down" (Digital Dog Radio Edit) – 4:00

== Charts ==
=== Weekly charts ===
Weekly chart performance for "I Will Never Let You Down"
Chart (2014)	Peak position
Australia (ARIA)	5
Austria (Ö3 Austria Top 40)	15
Belgium (Ultratip Bubbling Under Flanders)	12
Belgium Dance (Ultratop Flanders)	35
Belgium (Ultratip Bubbling Under Wallonia)	17
Belgium Dance (Ultratop Wallonia)	23
Canada Hot 100 (Billboard)	62
Canada CHR/Top 40 (Billboard)	34
Canada Hot AC (Billboard)	44
CIS Airplay (TopHit)	19
Czech Republic Airplay (ČNS IFPI)	56
Czech Republic Singles Digital (ČNS IFPI)	32
Euro Digital Song Sales (Billboard)	2
France (SNEP)	128
Germany (GfK)	23
Hungary (Editors' Choice Top 40)	26
Ireland (IRMA)	9
Italy (FIMI)	79
New Zealand (Recorded Music NZ)	9
Poland Dance (ZPAV)	48
Romania (Airplay 100)	18
Russia Airplay (TopHit)	17
Scottish Singles Sales (Official Charts)	1
Slovakia Airplay (ČNS IFPI)	23
Slovakia Singles Digital (ČNS IFPI)	33
Switzerland (Schweizer Hitparade)	12
UK Singles (Official Charts)	1
Ukraine Airplay (TopHit)	74
US Billboard Hot 100	77
US Dance Club Songs (Billboard)	1
US Pop Airplay (Billboard)	22

=== Monthly charts ===
Monthly chart performance for "I Will Never Let You Down"
Chart (2014)	Peak position
CIS (TopHit)	30
Russia Airplay (TopHit)	29
Ukraine Airplay (TopHit)	73

=== Year-end charts ===
Year-end chart performance for "I Will Never Let You Down"
Chart (2014)	Position
Australia (ARIA)	76
CIS (TopHit)	79
Germany (Official German Charts)	87
New Zealand (Recorded Music NZ)	50
Russia Airplay (TopHit)	104
Ukraine Airplay (TopHit)	104
UK Singles (Official Charts Company)	36
US Dance Club Songs (Billboard)	37

== Certifications ==
Certifications and sales for "I Will Never Let You Down"
Region	Certification	Certified units/sales
Australia (ARIA)	Platinum	70,000^{^}
Denmark (IFPI Danmark)	Gold	1,300,000^{†}
Germany (BVMI)	Gold	150,000^{‡}
Italy (FIMI)	Gold	15,000^{‡}
New Zealand (RMNZ)	Platinum	15,000^{*}
United Kingdom (BPI)	2× Platinum	1,200,000^{‡}
^{*} Sales figures based on certification alone.^{^} Shipments figures based on certification alone.^{‡} Sales+streaming figures based on certification alone.^{†} Streaming-only figures based on certification alone.

== Release history ==
Release dates and formats for "I Will Never Let You Down"
Region	Date	Format(s)	Label(s)	Ref.
Various	31 March 2014	Digital download; streaming	Columbia; Roc Nation	
Italy	4 April 2014	Radio airplay	Columbia	
United States	6 May 2014	Contemporary hit radio	Columbia	

== See also ==
- List of Billboard Dance Club Songs number ones of 2014
- List of number ones of 2014 (Scotland)
- List of UK Singles Chart number ones of the 2010s
