= K Koke =

English rapper

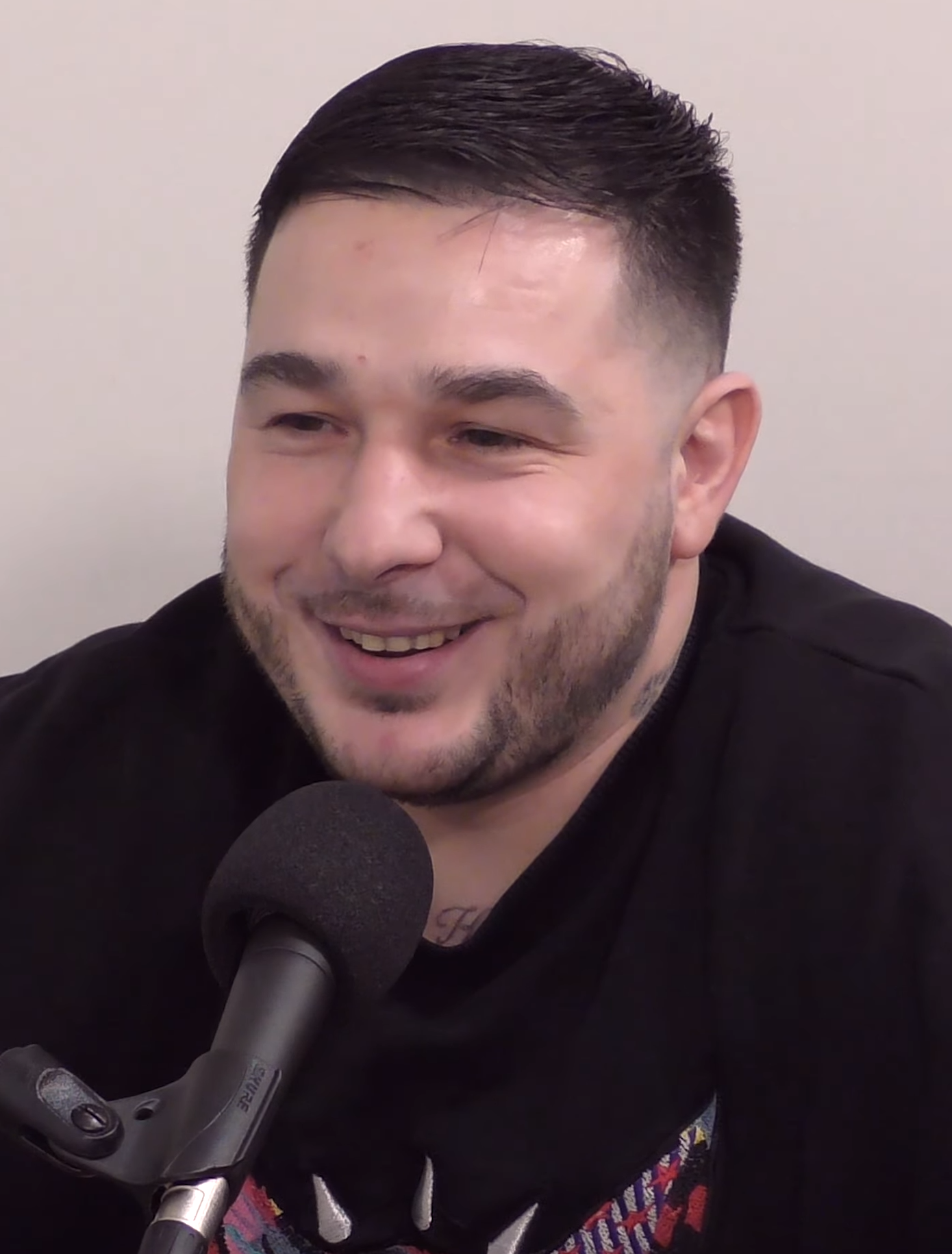
- K Koke in 2021

Background information
- Born: Kevin Georgiou; 22 May 1985 (age 41); Stonebridge, London, England
- Genres: British hip hop; road rap
- Years active: 2005–present
- Labels: U.S.G. (2005-present); Roc Nation (2011–2013); Universal Music (2015–present)

Kevin Georgiou (born 22 May 1985), known professionally as K Koke, is an English-Irish-Cypriot rapper. His Fire in the Booth freestyle on Charlie Sloth's show on BBC Radio 1Xtra has over 25 million YouTube views.

== Music career ==
His first mixtape, Pure Koke Volume One, was available free on various online outlets. Following radio play, he signed a deal with Roc Nation.

At the time of signing to Roc Nation, Georgiou was preparing to release Pure Koke Volume Two. He released visuals for singles "Nobody But Us" featuring Abel Miller, "Lord Knows" featuring Don Jaga and "Streets Are Cold" which features Birmingham's UK rap veteran Malik MD7. However, his music career was stopped abruptly when he was arrested for attempted murder in 2011.

Georgiou was later dropped from Roc Nation and in 2015 signed with Universal Music.

== Attempted murder trial ==
Georgiou was charged with the attempted murder of an unidentified 27-year-old football player at Harlesden station on 9 March 2011 along with associate named Levi who was remanded in custody pending trial in October 2011. The victim was shot in the back. Georgiou stood trial on 4 October 2011 and was acquitted of all charges on 3 November 2011 after seven months on remand.

== Discography ==
=== Albums ===
Title	Album details
I ain't perfect	Released: 31 October 2021; Label: STAY BIZZY; Format: CD, Digital download
Winners never quit	Released: 11 April 2025; Label: STAY BIZZY; Format: CD, Digital download; UK Album Downloads Chart: #36

=== Extended plays ===
Title	EP details
Koke, Vol II	Released: 25 March 2011; Label: Sony Music Entertainment; Format: Digital download; UK Hip Hop & R&B Albums Chart: #34
FFF Prison	Released: 30 March 2018; Label: USG Entertainment; Format: Digital download

=== Mixtapes ===
Title	Mixtape details
Pure Koke: Volume 1	Released: 8 April 2010; Label: Suspect ENT/Ruthless Records; Format: Digital download
Pure Koke: Volume 2	Released: 25 March 2011; Label: USG Entertainment; Format: Digital download
Pure Koke: Volume 3	Released: 10 January 2012; Label: Homealone/USG Entertainment; Format: Digital download
Pure Koke: Volume 4 UK: 60	Released: 7 July 2017; Label: USG Entertainment; Format: Digital download; UK Albums Chart: #60; UK Hip Hop & R&B Albums Chart: #3

=== Singles ===
Year	Title	Peak chart positions		Album
Year	Title	UK	SCO	Album
2012	"Turn Back" (featuring Maverick Sabre)	70	—	I Ain't Perfect
2013	"Lay Down Your Weapons" (featuring Rita Ora)	18	19	I Ain't Perfect
2013	"My Time" (featuring Bridget Kelly)	52	—	I Ain't Perfect
"—" denotes single that did not chart or was not released.
