= List of number-one singles of 2012 (Ireland) =

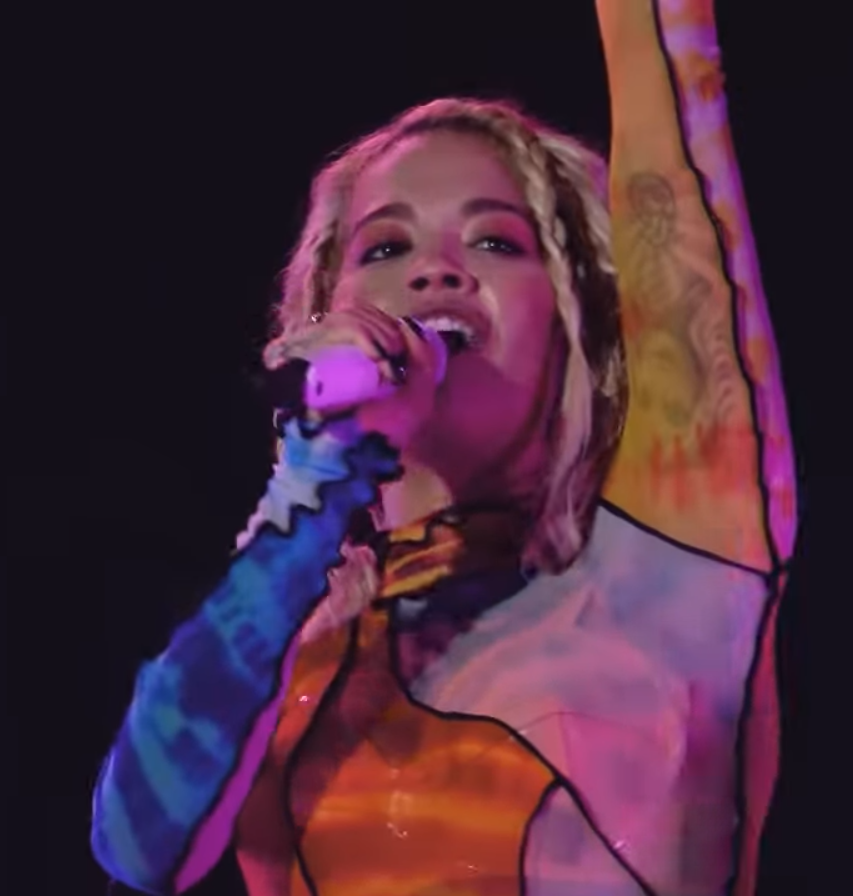
Rita Ora gained her first number one hit with How We Do (Party).

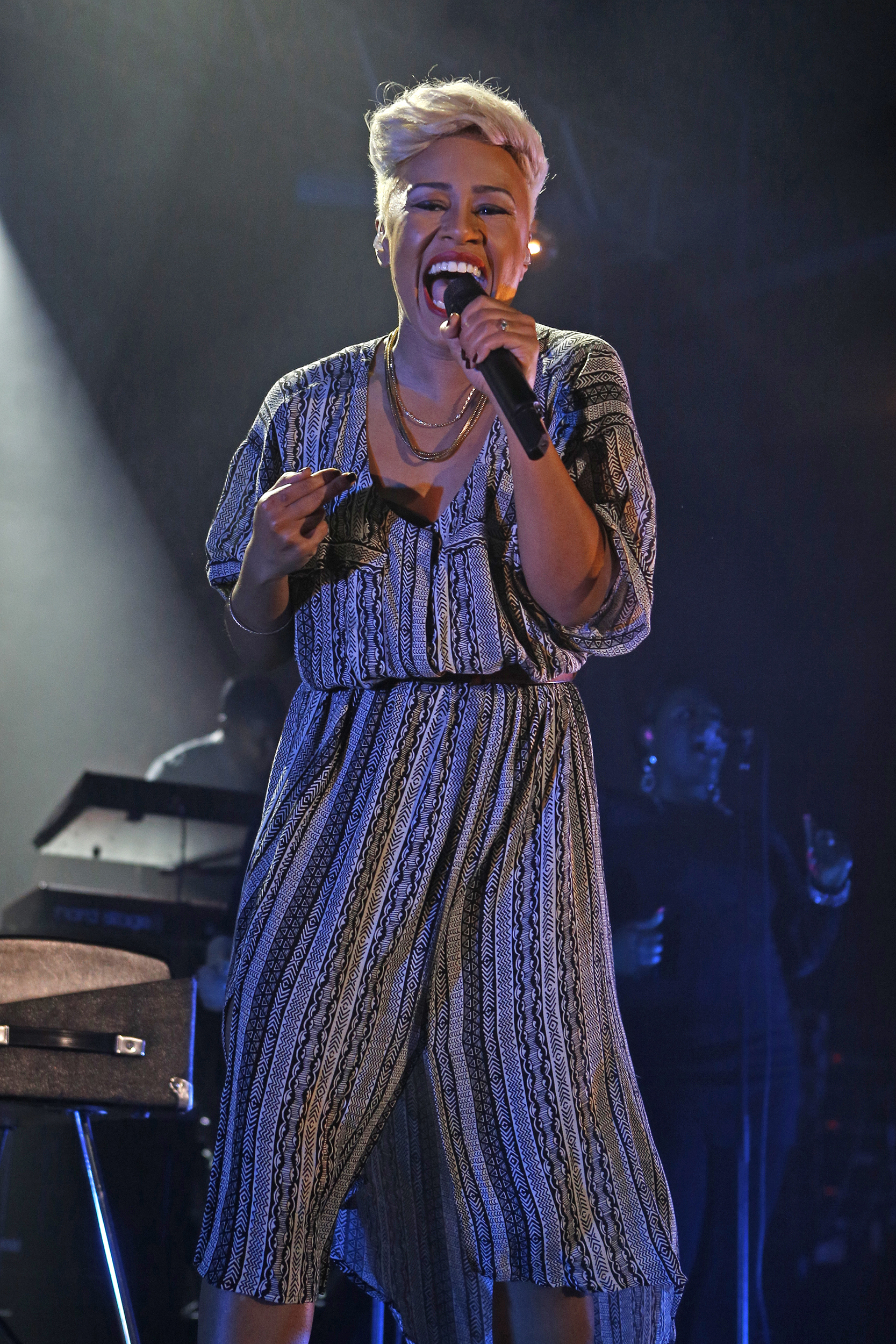
Emeli Sandé hit number one twice in 2012 with Next to Me and Beneath Your Beautiful, a collaboration with Labrinth.

The Irish Singles Chart is a record chart compiled by Chart-Track on behalf of the Irish Recorded Music Association. The chart week runs from Friday to Thursday.

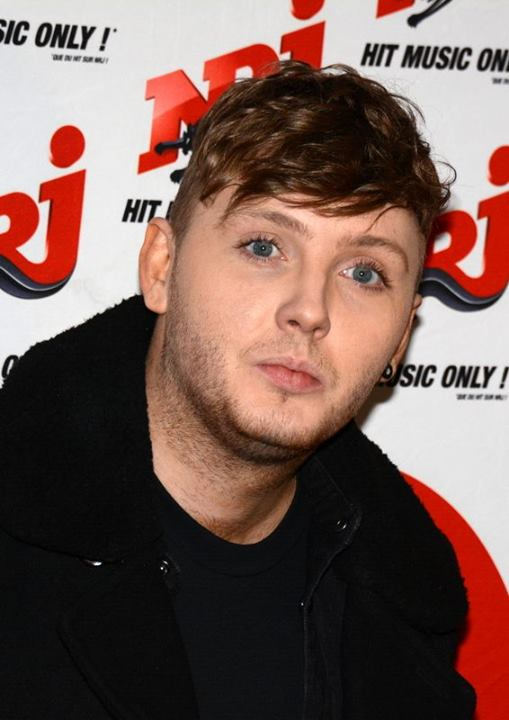
X Factor winner James Arthur hit number one with his debut single Impossible which spent five weeks at number one, three weeks in 2012 and 2 weeks in 2013.

Issue date	Song	Artist	Reference
5 January	"Cannonball"	Little Mix	
12 January	"Good Feeling"	Flo Rida	
19 January	"Domino"	Jessie J	
26 January	"Domino"	Jessie J	
2 February	"Somebody That I Used to Know"	Gotye featuring Kimbra	
9 February	"Somebody That I Used to Know"	Gotye featuring Kimbra	
16 February	"Next to Me"	Emeli Sandé	
23 February	"Next to Me"	Emeli Sandé	
1 March	"Somebody That I Used to Know"	Gotye featuring Kimbra	
8 March	"Somebody That I Used to Know"	Gotye featuring Kimbra	
15 March	"Somebody That I Used to Know"	Gotye featuring Kimbra	
22 March	"Call Me Maybe"	Carly Rae Jepsen	
29 March	"Call Me Maybe"	Carly Rae Jepsen	
5 April	"Call Me Maybe"	Carly Rae Jepsen	
12 April	"Call Me Maybe"	Carly Rae Jepsen	
19 April	"We Are Young"	Fun featuring Janelle Monáe	
26 April	"We Are Young"	Fun featuring Janelle Monáe	
3 May	"We Are Young"	Fun featuring Janelle Monáe	
10 May	"The Rocky Road to Poland"	Various artists	
17 May	"The Rocky Road to Poland"	Various artists	
24 May	"The Rocky Road to Poland"	Various artists	
31 May	"Euphoria"	Loreen	
7 June	"Euphoria"	Loreen	
14 June	"Call My Name"	Cheryl	
21 June	"Whistle"	Flo Rida	
28 June	"Whistle"	Flo Rida	
5 July	"Whistle"	Flo Rida	
12 July	"This Is Love"	will.i.am featuring Eva Simons	
19 July	"Spectrum (Say My Name)"	Florence and the Machine	
26 July	"Spectrum (Say My Name)"	Florence and the Machine	
2 August	"We'll Be Coming Back"	Calvin Harris featuring Example	
9 August	"How We Do (Party)"	Rita Ora	
16 August	"Little Talks"	Of Monsters and Men	
23 August	"Little Talks"	Of Monsters and Men	
30 August	"Wings"	Little Mix	
6 September	"Hall of Fame"	The Script featuring will.i.am	
13 September	"Hall of Fame"	The Script featuring will.i.am	
20 September	"Hall of Fame"	The Script featuring will.i.am	
27 September	"Hall of Fame"	The Script featuring will.i.am	
4 October	"Live While We're Young"	One Direction	
11 October	"Skyfall"	Adele	
18 October	"Sweet Nothing"	Calvin Harris featuring Florence Welch	
25 October	"Beneath Your Beautiful"	Labrinth featuring Emeli Sandé	
1 November	"Beneath Your Beautiful"	Labrinth featuring Emeli Sandé	
8 November	"Beneath Your Beautiful"	Labrinth featuring Emeli Sandé	
15 November	"Beneath Your Beautiful"	Labrinth featuring Emeli Sandé	
22 November	"Beneath Your Beautiful"	Labrinth featuring Emeli Sandé	
29 November	"Tiny Dancer a Song for Lily Mae"	Various Artists	
6 December	"Tiny Dancer a Song for Lily Mae"	Various Artists	
13 December	"Impossible"	James Arthur	
20 December	"Impossible"	James Arthur	
27 December	"Impossible"	James Arthur	

== See also ==
- List of number-one albums of 2012 (Ireland)
