= Lay Down Your Weapons =

Single by K Koke featuring Rita Ora

from the album I Ain't Perfect
- Released: 8 March 2013
- Recorded: 2012–13
- Genre: Hip hop
- Length: 3:44
- Label: RCA Records

K Koke singles chronology
"Turn Back" (2012)	"Lay Down Your Weapons" (2013)	"My Time" (2013)

Rita Ora singles chronology
"Radioactive" (2013)	"Lay Down Your Weapons" (2013)	"I Will Never Let You Down" (2014)

"Lay Down Your Weapons" is a song by English rapper K Koke featuring British singer Rita Ora. It was released on 8 March 2013 as a download in the United Kingdom and peaked at number 18 on the UK Singles Chart. The song was included on K Koke's debut studio album I Ain't Perfect (2013).

== Music video ==
A music video to accompany the release of "Lay Down Your Weapons" was first released onto YouTube on 20 January 2013 at a total length of four minutes and three seconds.

== Track listing ==
Digital download
No.	Title	Length
1.	"Lay Down Your Weapons" (feat. Rita Ora)	3:44

== Chart performance ==
On 17 March 2013 the song entered the UK Singles Chart at number 18, making it his first top 20 song in the UK.

== Charts ==
Chart (2012)	Position
Scottish Singles Sales (Official Charts)	19
UK Hip Hop/R&B (Official Charts)	4
UK Singles (Official Charts)	18

== Release history ==
Region	Date	Format	Label
United Kingdom	11 March 2013	Digital download	RCA Records
