= Radioactive Tour =

2013 concert tour by Rita Ora

- Tour by Rita Ora
- Promotional poster for the tour
- Associated album: Ora
- Start date: 28 January 2013
- End date: 31 August 2013
- Legs: 4
- No. of shows: 29 in Europe; 7 in Oceania; 1 in Asia; 37 total

Rita Ora concert chronology
- Ora Tour (2012); Radioactive Tour (2013); The Girls Tour (2018)

The Radioactive Tour was the second concert tour by British singer Rita Ora, in support of her debut studio album, Ora (2012). The tour began on 28 January 2013, in Manchester, England, and concluded on 31 August 2013. The fashion label, Pucci, created Ora's tour wardrobe.

== Opening acts ==
- Iggy Azalea (United Kingdom—Leg 1)
- DJ Fresh (Sydney—1 March)
- Zowie (Auckland)
- Ruby Frost (Auckland)

== Tour dates ==
List of concerts, showing date, city, country and venue
Date	City	Country	Venue
Leg 1 — Europe
28 January 2013	Manchester	England	Manchester Academy
29 January 2013	Newcastle	England	O_{2} Academy
30 January 2013	Glasgow	Scotland	O_{2} Academy
1 February 2013	Sheffield	England	O_{2} Academy
2 February 2013	Cardiff	Wales	The Great Hall
5 February 2013	London	England	O_{2} Shepherd's Bush Empire
6 February 2013	London	England	O_{2} Shepherd's Bush Empire
8 February 2013	Bournemouth	England	O_{2} Academy
9 February 2013	Birmingham	England	O_{2} Academy
11 February 2013	Bristol	England	O_{2} Academy
12 February 2013	York	England	Barbican Centre
13 February 2013	Leeds	England	O_{2} Academy
Leg 2 — Oceania
1 March 2013^{[A]}	Sydney	Australia	Enmore Theatre
2 March 2013^{[B]}	Brisbane	Australia	Doomben Racecourse
8 March 2013^{[C]}	Melbourne	Australia	Flemington Racecourse
9 March 2013^{[B]}	Sydney	Australia	Randwick Racecourse
10 March 2013^{[B]}	Melbourne	Australia	Flemington Racecourse
11 March 2013^{[B]}	Adelaide	Australia	Bonython Park
15 March 2013	Auckland	New Zealand	The Powerstation
Leg 3 — Asia
16 March 2013^{[D]}	Sepang District	Malaysia	Sepang International Circuit
Leg 4 — Europe
24 May 2013^{[E]}	Derry	Northern Ireland	Ebrington Square
26 May 2013^{[F]}	London	England	Victoria Park
1 June 2013^{[G]}	London	England	Twickenham Stadium
8 June 2013^{[H]}	Newbury	England	Newbury Racecourse
9 June 2013^{[I]}	Manchester	England	Heaton Park
22 June 2013^{[J]}	Sunderland	England	Stadium of Light
26 June 2013^{[K]}	Floriana	Malta	The Granaries
28 June 2013^{[L]}	Pilton	England	Worthy Farm
13 July 2013^{[M]}	London	England	Queen Elizabeth Olympic Park
14 July 2013^{[N]}	Perth and Kinross	Scotland	Balado
26 July 2013^{[O]}	Long Marston	England	Long Marston Airfield
27 July 2013^{[P]}	Birchington-on-Sea	England	Quex Park
3 August 2013^{[Q]}	Naas	Ireland	Punchestown Racecourse
4 August 2013^{[R]}	Lytham St Annes	England	Lytham Green
17 August 2013^{[T]}	Weston-under-Lizard	England	Weston Park
18 August 2013^{[T]}	Chelmsford	England	Hylands Park
31 August 2013^{[U]}	Costessey	England	Royal Norfolk Showground

== Notes ==
Festivals and other miscellaneous performances

^{A} Future Music Sideshow
^{B} Future Music Festival
^{C} Good Life Festival
^{D} Future Music Festival Asia
^{E} Radio 1's Big Weekend
^{F} As One in the Park
^{G} Chime for Change
^{H} Party in the Paddock
^{I} Parklife Weekender
^{J} North East Live
^{K} Isle of MTV
^{L} Glastonbury Festival
^{M} Wireless Festival
^{N} T in the Park
^{O} Global Gathering
^{P} South Island Festival
^{Q} Oxegen
^{R} Lytham Proms Festival
^{T} V Festival
^{U} Sundown Festival

Cancellations and rescheduled shows

3 March 2013	Joondalup, Australia	Arena Joondalup	Cancelled. This concert was a part of the "Future Music Festival".
6 March 2013	Brisbane, Australia	The Tivoli	Cancelled. This concert was a part of the "Future Music Sideshow".
7 March 2013	Sydney, Australia	Sydney Harbour	Cancelled. This concert was a part of "Island Party".
9 August 2013	Haydock, England	Haydock Park Racecourse	Cancelled. This concert was a part of "Haydock Park Nights".
