= We Have a Theme Song =

Video by The Pillows
- Released: February 26, 1999(VHS) September 9, 2003 (DVD)
- Genre: Alternative rock
- Label: King Records

We Have a Theme Song is a collection of music videos by The Pillows released onto VHS and DVD. As well as featuring music videos, it features a clay animation about a robot by Sawao Yamanaka played between each video. The DVD version includes two extra videos.

== Songs ==
1. "Strange Chameleon"
2. "Swanky Street"
3. "Trip Dancer"
4. "Kanojo wa Kyou"
5. "One Life"
6. "Hybrid Rainbow"
7. "Another Morning"
8. "No Self Control"
9. "Instant Music"
10. "Daydream Wonder" (DVD bonus)
11. "Tiny Boat" (DVD bonus)
