= Stroll and Roll =

STROLL AND ROLL

Studio album by The Pillows
- Released: April 6, 2016
- Genre: Alternative rock
- Length: 36:42
- Labels: Delicious Label, King Records

The Pillows chronology
Moondust (2014)	STROLL AND ROLL (2016)

Stroll and Roll (stylized as STROLL AND ROLL) is the twentieth studio album by Japanese alternative rock band The Pillows. It was released on April 6, 2016.

== Track listing ==
All tracks are written by Sawao Yamanaka.

No.	Title	Length
1.	"Debris (デブリ, Deburi)"	3:37
2.	"One Flew under the Cuckoo's Nest (カッコーの巣の下で, Kakkō no Su no Shita de)"	4:40
3.	"I RIOT"	3:53
4.	"Rock 'n' Roll to Taiyō (ロックンロールと太陽, Rokku n Rōru to Taiyō)"	2:16
5.	"Subtropical Fantasy"	3:18
6.	"Elliot no Higeki (エリオットの悲劇, Eriotto no Higeki)"	3:43
7.	"Blagodarnost (ブラゴダルノスト, Buragodarunosuto)"	4:22
8.	"Radiotelegraphy (レディオテレグラフィー, Redioteregurafī)"	3:50
9.	"Stroll and Roll"	4:00
10.	"Locomotion, more! more!"	3:03
Total length:		36:42
