= List of number-one albums of 2012 (Ireland) =

The Irish Albums Chart is a record chart compiled by Chart-Track on behalf of the Irish Recorded Music Association. The chart week runs from Friday to Thursday.

Issue date	Album	Artist	Reference
5 January	21	Adele	
12 January	21	Adele	
19 January	21	Adele	
26 January	21	Adele	
2 February	Born to Die	Lana Del Rey	
9 February	Born to Die	Lana Del Rey	
16 February	Born to Die	Lana Del Rey	
23 February	The Ultimate Collection	Whitney Houston	
1 March	21	Adele	
8 March	Wrecking Ball	Bruce Springsteen	
15 March	Wrecking Ball	Bruce Springsteen	
22 March	Wrecking Ball	Bruce Springsteen	
29 March	MDNA	Madonna	
5 April	Red to Blue	Mick Flannery	
12 April	Red to Blue	Mick Flannery	
19 April	Red to Blue	Mick Flannery	
26 April	Nudie Books and Frenchies	Aslan	
3 May	Electra Heart	Marina and the Diamonds	
10 May	Strangeland	Keane	
17 May	Electra Heart	Marina and the Diamonds	
24 May	Up All Night	One Direction	
31 May	Valtari	Sigur Rós	
7 June	+	Ed Sheeran	
14 June	Number Ones	Bee Gees	
21 June	Believe	Justin Bieber	
28 June	Young Love	Jedward	
5 July	Young Love	Jedward	
12 July	Ceremonials	Florence and the Machine	
19 July	Wrecking Ball	Bruce Springsteen	
26 July	Greatest Hits	Bruce Springsteen & The E Street Band	
2 August	21	Adele	
9 August	+	Ed Sheeran	
16 August	Ryan O'Shaughnessy	Ryan O'Shaughnessy	
23 August	Ryan O'Shaughnessy	Ryan O'Shaughnessy	
30 August	My Head Is an Animal	Of Monsters and Men	
6 September	Beacon	Two Door Cinema Club	
13 September	#3	The Script	
20 September	Battle Born	The Killers	
27 September	Babel	Mumford & Sons	
4 October	Babel	Mumford & Sons	
11 October	Babel	Mumford & Sons	
18 October	Babel	Mumford & Sons	
25 October	Red	Taylor Swift	
1 November	Red	Taylor Swift	
8 November	Take the Crown	Robbie Williams	
15 November	Take Me Home	One Direction	
22 November	Take Me Home	One Direction	
29 November	Take Me Home	One Direction	
6 December	Take Me Home	One Direction	
13 December	Take Me Home	One Direction	
20 December	Take Me Home	One Direction	
27 December	Unapologetic	Rihanna	

== See also ==
- List of number-one singles of 2012 (Ireland)
