= Tokyo Bambi =

Single by The Pillows
- Released: January 30, 2008
- Genre: Alternative rock
- Length: 11:15
- Label: Avex Trax

The Pillows singles chronology
"Ladybird Girl" (2007)	"Tokyo Bambi" (2008)	"New Animal" (2008)

Alternative cover
- Limited edition

"Tokyo Bambi" is a single released by The Pillows on January 30, 2008. Its limited edition comes with DVD containing the music videos for the title track and the B-side "Go! Go! Jupiter". The title "Tokyo Bambi" and the cover art contain a reference to the eponymous deer from the book Bambi, A Life in the Woods and the film Bambi.

== Track listing ==
1. "Tokyo Bambi"
2. "Go! Go! Jupiter"
3. "Across the Metropolis"

== Personnel ==
- Sawao Yamanaka – vocals, guitar
- Yoshiaki Manabe – guitar
- Shinichirou Sato – drums
- Jun Suzuki – bass
- Nargo – horn section

== Chart performance ==
Chart	Peak position
Oricon Daily	4
Oricon Weekly	9
2008 Oricon Top 100 Singles	?
