= Radioactive (Rita Ora song) =

2012 single by Rita Ora

Single by Rita Ora

from the album Ora
- Released: 11 February 2013
- Genre: Neo-disco; pop; urban
- Length: 4:11
- Label: Columbia; Roc Nation
- Songwriters: Greg Kurstin; Sia Furler
- Producers: Greg Kurstin; Sia Furler

Rita Ora singles chronology
| "Shine Ya Light" (2012) | "Radioactive" (2013) | "Lay Down Your Weapons" (2013) |

Music video
- "Radioactive" on YouTube

"Radioactive" is a song by British singer Rita Ora from her debut studio album, Ora (2012). The song was written and produced by Greg Kurstin and Sia Furler. It was released as the fourth single from the album for digital download and streaming by Columbia and Roc Nation in the United States on 11 February 2013.

A rhythmic upbeat neo-disco, pop and urban song, it received mixed to positive responses from music critics, who mostly applauded the music, sound and Ora's vocal delivery, but criticized its unoriginality. The song reached the top 30 in Australia, the Flemish region of Belgium, Ireland, Scotland and the United Kingdom. It received a silver certification from the British Phonographic Industry (BPI) in the UK and a gold certification from the Australian Recording Industry Association (ARIA) in Australia. A futuristic and science fiction-inspired music video for "Radioactive" premiered on 10 December 2012, depicting her as a robotic femme fatale in a post-apocalyptic landscape. The video was well received by critics, with praise concentrated on Ora's appearance and fashion.

== Background and composition ==
"Radioactive" was written and produced by American producer Greg Kurstin and Australian singer Sia Furler. Columbia and Roc Nation distributed it as the fourth single of Ora's debut studio album Ora for digital download and streaming in the United States on 27 August 2012. Several remixes, which were done by Baggi Begovic, Lucien Foort, the Flexican, Waze & Odyssey and Zed Bias, accompanied the single's release as part of an extended play (EP) in Ireland and the United Kingdom on 8 February 2013. Musically, "Radioactive" is a rhythmic upbeat neo-disco, pop and urban song with a house production, starting with a 30-second opener and finishing with an electro sound.

== Reception ==
Upon release, "Radioactive" received mixed to positive responses from music critics. Entertainment Focus' Carys Jones praised Ora's vocal delivery and the song's music, writing that "[it] sounds like Rita Ora, Jennifer Lopez, [Rihanna] and Nicki Minaj have all put their magic ingredients of creating a hit together into one big pot and served up a great big helping of urban-pop magic." Sam Lansky from Idolator viewed the song as the "standout" from Ora and highlighted its "pounding" production and "soaring" chorus. Amy Everett for Red similarly branded the song as a "standout" from the album and described it as a "dance anthem" with a "strong catchy" chorus. Julianne Escobedo Shepherd of Spin labeled the song as a "great [...] house bow" saying that "[it] winches nicely with Ora's [...] vocals." Robert Copsey from Digital Spy complimented the song's "euphoric" synths and "thumping" electro bass and explained that "Ora tak[es] on the role of [a] club diva." Alex Macpherson for Fact commented that Ora "attempt[ed] to cop the second-hand swag of every big name she can think of, [including] Lady Gaga's machinic hedonism on ['the song']." Lucy Jones of NME further commented, "Oh Wizadora, Kia-Ora, Understudy Rihanna, etc. 'We Found Love' this is not."

As Ora's sixth charting single in the UK, "Radioactive" debuted at number 60 on the UK Singles Chart issue dated 26 January 2013 and reached its peak at number 18 two weeks later. In 2022, it received a silver certification by the British Phonographic Industry (BPI) for selling 200,000 units in the UK. The song also reached number 12 on the Scottish Singles Chart and number 30 on the Irish Singles Chart. In Australia, it peaked at number 23 on the ARIA Singles Chart and also received a gold certification from the Australian Recording Industry Association (ARIA) for selling more than 35,000 units. Elsewhere, the song reached number 20 in the Flemish region of Belgium and number 27 on the Billboard Global Dance Songs ranking.

== Music video ==
An accompanying music video was uploaded to Ora's official YouTube channel on 10 December 2012. Behind-the-scenes footage from various stages of filming the video was published on the aforementioned platform on 19 December. The four-minute and 22-second futuristic and science fiction-inspired video was directed by American director James Larese of Syndrome. It depicts the singer as a robotic femme fatale in a post-apocalyptic landscape and a world of spaceships. In a blue and purple alternating scene, Ora is first shown dancing in front of nuclear-projected clouds and forming a triangle with her hands. The title of the song and several animated circles above and next to her subsequently start to appear, which in turn were described as forming a high-tech compass. Next, the video cuts into a red-lit scene, in which the singer spins in a floating chair against a backdrop of industrial waste accompanied by two guards next to her, who wear gasmaks and hold torn flags. The proceeding scene portrays Ora in a high-tech surrounding with animated figures being created throughout. Towards the end, it shows the singer riding through a tunnel on a Tron-labeled motorbike. These scenes are interspersed with shots of Ora's face attached to a cybernetic and robotic headpiece rotating in an orange and red-lit setting.

Both Vicki Valery from Vibe and Shepherd from Spin commended Ora's attire worn in the video and created by American designer Asher Levine. On a similar note, Max Cajé for Finíssimo lauded her fashion as "daring" and "very futuristic", writing that she appeared "with a very different look from the R&B style we are used to". While complimenting Ora's styling, Lansky of Idolator stated that the settings and effects used in the video were "intended to look futuristic" but felt that "they just look[ed] campy".

== Track listing ==
- Digital download and streaming
1. "Radioactive" – 4:11
- Digital download and streaming – Extended play (EP)
1. "Radioactive" – 4:11
2. "Radioactive" (Zed Bias Remix) – 6:16
3. "Radioactive" (Waze & Odyssey Remix) – 6:44
4. "Radioactive" (The Flexican Remix) – 5:08
5. "Radioactive" (Baggi Begovic Remix) – 5:46
6. "Radioactive" (Lucien Foort Remix) – 6:22

== Charts ==
=== Weekly charts ===
Weekly chart performance for "Radioactive"
| Chart (2013) | Peak position |
|---|---|
| Australia (ARIA) | 23 |
| Belgium (Ultratip Bubbling Under Flanders) | 20 |
| CIS Airplay (TopHit) | 170 |
| Global Dance Songs (Billboard) | 27 |
| Ireland (IRMA) | 30 |
| Scottish Singles Sales (Official Charts) | 12 |
| UK Singles (Official Charts) | 18 |

=== Year-end charts ===
Year-end chart performance for "Radioactive"
| Chart (2013) | Position |
|---|---|
| UK Singles (OCC) | 162 |

== Certifications ==
Certifications and sales for "Radioactive"
| Region | Certification | Certified units/sales |
|---|---|---|
| Australia (ARIA) | Gold | 35,000^{^} |
| United Kingdom (BPI) | Silver | 200,000^{‡} |
^{^} Shipments figures based on certification alone.^{‡} Sales+streaming figures based on certification alone.

== Release history ==
Release dates and formats for "Radioactive"
| Region | Date | Format(s) | Label(s) | Ref. |
|---|---|---|---|---|
| United States | 27 August 2012 | Digital download; streaming | Columbia; Roc Nation | |
| Ireland | 8 February 2013 | Digital download; streaming | Columbia; Roc Nation | |
| United Kingdom | 8 February 2013 | Digital download; streaming | Columbia; Roc Nation | |
