= Pied Piper (The Pillows album) =

PIED PIPER

Studio album by the pillows
- Released: June 25, 2008
- Genre: Alternative rock
- Length: 37:44
- Label: Avex Trax

The pillows chronology
Lostman Go to Yesterday (2007)	PIED PIPER (2008)	Rock Stock & Too Smoking the pillows (2009)

Singles from PIED PIPER
- 1. "Ladybird Girl" Released: August 15, 2007; 2. "Tokyo Bambi" Released: January 30, 2008; 3. "New Animal" Released: May 28, 2008

Professional ratings
Review scores
Source	Rating
Allmusic	link

PIED PIPER is the fifteenth studio album by the pillows, released on June 25, 2008. It includes the singles "Ladybird Girl", "Tokyo Bambi", and "New Animal" as well as the b-side "Across the Metropolis".

== Tracks ==
1. PIED PIPER
2. New Animal
3. No Surrender
4. Last Holiday
5. Tokyo Zombie (The knock came at dead of night)
6. Across the metropolis
7. Purple Apple
8. Tokyo Bambi
9. Ladybird Girl
10. That's a wonderful world (song for Hermit)
11. POISON ROCK'N'ROLL

== Chart performance ==
Chart	Peak position
Oricon Daily	5
Oricon Weekly	13
2008 Oricon Top 100 Albums	?
