= Moondust (album) =

MOONDUST

Studio album by The Pillows
- Released: October 22, 2014
- Genre: Alternative rock
- Length: 38:37
- Label: Avex Trax

The Pillows chronology
Trial (2012)	MOONDUST (2014)	Stroll and Roll (2016)

MOONDUST is the nineteenth studio album by Japanese alternative rock band The Pillows. It was released on October 22, 2014, and marks the band's 25th anniversary.

== Track listing ==
All tracks are written by Sawao Yamanaka

No.	Title	Length
1.	"Clean State Revolution"	3:10
2.	"Break a Time Machine!"	2:53
3.	"Tokainoalice (Alice in the City)"	3:35
4.	"About a Rock 'n' Roll Band"	3:24
5.	"Prairie Rider"	4:11
6.	"Happy Birthday"	4:52
7.	"Anemone"	5:03
8.	"Song for You"	2:24
9.	"Message"	2:56
10.	"Moondust"	5:33
11.	"Ideal Affection"	2:36
Total length:		38:37
