= 117 (film) =

- Directed by: Besim Sahatçiu
- Written by: Besim Sahatçiu
- Produced by: Adil Begolli
- Cinematography: Afrim Spahiu
- Edited by: Mentor Kaci
- Distributed by: Kosovo Film
- Release date: 1976
- Running time: 19 minutes
- Country: Yugoslavia (Kosovo)
- Language: Albanian

117 is a 1976 Yugoslav (Kosovar) short documentary film directed by Besim Sahatçiu. It was produced by Kosovafilmi in Pristina. It was shot in the Kosovar village of Nevokaze, Gjakova, and depicts the day-to-day life of an Albanian family of 117 members. The film won the Grand Prix prize at the 1978 Belgrade Documentary and Short Film Festival. It screened as a restoration at the 2022 Dokufest.
