= Wake Up! Wake Up! Wake Up! =

Studio album by The Pillows
- Released: May 2, 2007
- Genre: Alternative rock
- Length: 43:31
- Label: Avex Trax; AVCD-23281B

The Pillows chronology
My Foot (2006)	Wake Up! Wake Up! Wake Up! (2007)	Lostman Go to Yesterday (2007)

Singles from Wake Up! Wake Up! Wake Up!
- 1. "Scarecrow" Released: April 4, 2007

Professional ratings
Review scores
Source	Rating
Allmusic	3.5/5 stars

Wake Up! Wake Up! Wake Up! is an album that was released by The Pillows on May 2, 2007.

== Track listing ==
1. "Wake up! Dodo"
2. "Youngster (Kent Arrow)"
3. "Propose" (プロポーズ)
4. "Scarecrow" (スケアクロウ)
5. "Boat House"
6. "The Pleasure Song" (プレジャー・ソング)
7. "Serious Plan" (シリアス・プラン)
8. "Skinny Blues"
9. "Private Kingdom" (プライベート・キングダム)
10. "Century Creepers (Voice of the Proteus)"
11. "Sweet Baggy Days"
