= Besim Sahatçiu =

Kosovo Albanian film director (1935–2005)

- Born: 2 October 1935; Peja, Zeta Banovina, Kingdom of Yugoslavia (modern-day Kosovo)
- Died: 20 October 2005 (aged 70); Pristina, FR Yugoslavia (modern-day Kosovo)
- Education: University of Belgrade; University of Zagreb
- Occupations: Director, screenwriter, producer
- Spouse: Besa Sahatçiu
- Children: 2
- Relatives: Rita Sahatçiu Ora (granddaughter)

Besim Sahatçiu (Albanian pronunciation: [bɛˈsim sahatˈtʃiu]; 2 October 1935 – 20 October 2005) was a Kosovo Albanian director of theatre and film.

== Biography ==
After finishing gymnasium in Peja, Sahatçiu studied literature at the University of Belgrade. Following the interruption of his studies due to compulsory military service, he worked as a translator for the publisher, Rilindja. He later studied at the Academy of Dramatic Art in Zagreb, Croatia, and defended his thesis with staging Gogol's satirical play, The Government Inspector, at People's Provincial Theatre in Pristina.

Sahatçiu's ethnographic film, 117, won the Grand Prix at the Belgrade Documentary and Short Film Festival in 1978. The film was described as a “spiritual portrait of the nation.”

As a theatre director, Sahatçiu worked at the National Theatre of Kosovo in Pristina.

In 2018, Kosovo's Ministry of Culture posthumously honored Sahatçiu with a Lifetime Achievement Award for Cinematography. The same year, a street in Pristina was named after him. In 2021, Posta e Kosovës issued postage stamps in its 'Arti skenik – Besim Sahatçiu dhe Leze Qena' series, commemorating Sahatçiu and Leze Qena.

== Filmography ==
- Crveni udar (1974)
- Trimi (1975)
- Tito na Kosovu (1975)
- Gëzuar viti i ri (1976)
- Pehlivanët (1976)
- 117 (1976)
- Pasqyra (1977)
- Duke pritur Godon (1977)
- Era dhe lisi (1979)
- Tito e Kosova 79 (1980)
- Tre vetë kapërcejn malin (1981)
- Përroi vërshues (1983)
- Lulepjeshkat e dashurisë (1988)
