= Lostman Go to Yesterday =

Compilation album by The Pillows
- Released: November 14, 2007
- Recorded: 1993–2005
- Genre: Alternative rock
- Label: King Records

The Pillows chronology
Wake Up! Wake Up! Wake Up! (2007)	Lostman Go to Yesterday (2007)	Pied Piper (2008)

Lostman Go to Yesterday is a singles/b-sides collection by The Pillows, covering the period they were with King Records. It features fifty-seven songs on five discs and the twenty-one music videos for the singles on a DVD that is packaged with the discs.

== Tracks ==
Disc one
No.	Title	Length
1.	"Daydream Wonder"	3:30
2.	"In Front of a Locked Door" (Akanai Tobira no Mae de)	6:27
3.	"Girlfriend"	4:37
4.	"Girlfriend (Love Letter Version)"	5:08
5.	"As I Can Be" (Boku de Irareru Youni)	3:32
6.	"Tiny Boat"	5:32
7.	"Patricia"	4:46
8.	"Strange Chameleon (Strange Version)"	4:40
9.	"Yellow Beans"	3:16
10.	"Fakin' It" (Simon & Garfunkel cover)	2:57

Disc two
No.	Title	Length
1.	"Swanky Street"	4:48
2.	"Spiky Goose"	3:03
3.	"When You Were Mine"	3:56
4.	"Trip Dancer"	4:00
5.	"Lesser Hamster in Blue" (Ressaa Hamusuta no Yuutsu)	3:30
6.	"Today, She..." (Kanojo wa Kyou,)	5:22
7.	"Going Down"	3:34
8.	"One Life"	4:10
9.	"Cherry"	3:57
10.	"Stalker Goes to Babylon"	4:07
11.	"Like a Lovesong (Back to Back)"	3:06

Disc three
No.	Title	Length
1.	"Hybrid Rainbow"	4:02
2.	"Beautiful Picture"	6:04
3.	"Another Morning"	4:31
4.	"Plastic Flower"	4:12
5.	"Swanky Street (Live at The Orange-London)"	5:24
6.	"No Self Control"	3:40
7.	"Wonderful Sight"	3:00
8.	"Nightmare"	1:42
9.	"Instant Music"	3:19
10.	"Ninny"	3:28
11.	"Carnival"	3:52
12.	"Curly Rudy"	3:00
13.	"Come Down"	2:09

Disc four
No.	Title	Length
1.	"Rush"	3:42
2.	"She Is Perfect"	3:30
3.	"Sleepy Head"	3:03
4.	"Ride On Shooting Star"	2:23
5.	"Skeleton Liar"	3:18
6.	"Subhuman"	3:53
7.	"I Think I Can"	3:00
8.	"We Have a Theme Song"	2:42
9.	"Scent of Sweet"	3:13
10.	"White Summer and Green Bicycle, Red Hair with Black Guitar (Display Version)" (Shroi Natsu to Midori no Jitensha, Akai Kami to Kuroi Gitaa)	4:03
11.	"I Want to Live Like That" (Sonna Fuuni Sugoshitai)	4:53

Disc five
No.	Title	Length
1.	"Terminal Heaven's Rock"	4:21
2.	"Sick Vibration"	4:24
3.	"Over Amp"	3:21
4.	"That Future Is Now" (Sono Mirai wa Ima)	3:27
5.	"Beehive"	4:44
6.	"Heavy Sun (With Baby Son)"	2:42
7.	"Non Fiction"	3:18
8.	"Heart Is There"	3:20
9.	"My Girl (Fiction Version)"	4:23
10.	"The Third Eye"	3:58
11.	"Slow Down"	2:59
12.	"Song of Farewell" (Wakare no Uta)	3:59

Disc six (DVD)
No.	Title	Length
1.	"Daydream Wonder"
2.	"Girlfriend" (new to DVD)
3.	"Tiny Boat"
4.	"Strange Chameleon"
5.	"Swanky Street"
6.	"Trip Dancer"
7.	"Today, She..."
8.	"One Life"
9.	"Hybrid Rainbow"
10.	"Another Morning"
11.	"No Self Control"
12.	"Instant Music"
13.	"Carnival"
14.	"Rush"
15.	"Ride on Shooting Star"
16.	"I Think I Can"
17.	"White Summer and Green Bicycle, Red Hair with Black Guitar"
18.	"Terminal Heaven's Rock"
19.	"That Future is Now" (new to DVD)
20.	"Non Fiction" (new to DVD)
21.	"The Third Eye" (new to DVD)
