= The Rocky Road to Poland =

Anthem of the Republic of Ireland national soccer team

Single by Damien Dempsey, The Dubliners, Bressie, Danny O'Reilly and Republic of Ireland national football team
- Released: 4 May 2012
- Recorded: 2012
- Genre: Trad-Pop
- Length: 2:53
- Label: Emi Music Ireland
- Songwriter: Today Fm Listeners

"The Rocky Road to Poland" is a song released in 2012 as the official anthem of the Republic of Ireland national soccer team for the 2012 European Championships, held in Poland and Ukraine. The song was published by EMI Music Ireland. The song was released for download on the 4 May 2012.

"The Rocky Road to Poland" was performed on The Late Late Show on the 11 May 2012, the song was also played on the popular football show Soccer AM. The song also happens to be the last recording of the late Barney McKenna and the last single to be released by The Dubliners.

It is an adaptation of the Irish folk song "The Rocky Road to Dublin".

== Chart performance ==
"The Rocky Road to Poland" debuted at number 1 on the Irish Singles Chart on the 10 May 2012 beating competition like Jedward. All proceeds for the song is going to the John Giles Foundation and the Irish Cancer Society.

| Chart | Peak Position |
|---|---|
| Ireland (IRMA) | 1 |

== Release history ==
| Region | Date | Format | Label |
|---|---|---|---|
| Ireland | May 4, 2012 | Digital download | Emi Music Ireland |

== See also ==
- List of number-one singles of 2012 (Ireland)
