= Turn Back (EP) =

EP by The Pillows
- Released: June 23, 2004
- Genre: Alternative rock
- Length: 28:59
- Label: King Records; KICS-1090

The Pillows chronology
Penalty Life (2003)	Turn Back (2004)	Synchronized Rockers (2004)

Turn Back is an EP released by The Pillows on June 23, 2004. It contains re-recordings of song originally published between 1990 and 1996 and was part of the band's 15th anniversary releases. The cover art is based on the folktale Town Musicians of Bremen by the Brothers Grimm.

== Track listing ==
1. "Liberty"
2. "Tiny Boat"
3. "Back to Then" (あの頃に戻って)
4. "You and Me and Mr. Moon" (キミと僕とお月様)
5. "Want to Sleep For"
6. "Our Halley's Comet" (僕らのハレー彗星)
