= Shine Ya Light =

2012 single by Rita Ora

Single by Rita Ora

from the album Ora
- Released: 17 October 2012
- Length: 3:30
- Label: Columbia; Roc Nation
- Songwriters: Chris Loco; Fraser T. Smith; LP
- Producers: Chris Loco; Fraser T. Smith

Rita Ora singles chronology
"R.I.P." (2012)	"Shine Ya Light" (2012)	"Radioactive" (2012)

Music video
- "Shine Ya Light" on YouTube

"Shine Ya Light" is a song by British singer Rita Ora from her debut studio album, Ora (2012). The song was written by Chris Loco, Fraser T. Smith and LP, with the production handled by Loco and Smith. It was released as the third single from the album, serviced for radio airplay in the United Kingdom on 17 October 2012 by Columbia and Roc Nation. Containing a motivational message, it is an urban song blending dubstep and reggae influences. The song garnered positive reception from music critics, several of whom applauded its appeal and message. "Shine Ya Light" entered the top 30 of the record charts in Ireland, Scotland and the UK and attained a silver certification from the British Phonographic Industry (BPI) in the third country. The accompanying music video premiered on 27 October 2012. Directed by Emil Nava, the video is a tribute to Ora's homeland Kosovo, exploring her return and journey in Pristina. To promote the song, the singer performed it live at Jimmy Kimmel Live! and on the ninth season of The X Factor UK in 2012. Other performances were broadcast during Vevo's Lift campaign as well as MTV's Unplugged series.

== Background and composition ==
"Shine Ya Light" was written by Chris Loco, Fraser T. Smith and LP, and produced by Loco and Smith with assistance from Nikki Flores. The song's mastering was completed by Tom Coyne, with its mixing performed by Smith, who was further responsible for the programming with Loco. Other involved personnel included Anna Ugarte, who acted as the assistant engineer, as well as Beatriz Artola and Jim Caruana, who functioned as the recording engineers. "Shine Ya Light" was released as the third single of Ora's debut studio album Ora (2012). The song was serviced for radio airplay in the United Kingdom on 17 October 2012 and in Italy on 16 November. Several remixes, which were done by the 2 Bears, Bimbo Jones, Dannic and Gregor Salto, were released for digital download and streaming by Roc Nation as part of an extended play (EP) on 2 November 2012. In talking about the song, Ora elaborated: "[It] was one of those songs that I wanted to do that came from a different kind of world [...] You can hear my influences in it. Reggae is one of my big influences. I love mixing and matching genres. That's who I am. It feels good. It reminds me of an anthem." "Shine Ya Light" is an urban song, with dubstep and reggae influences, fusing a "poppy" sounding bridge, "rocky and gritty" chorus and a "reggae-esque" verse. The lyrics contain a motivational message as Ora sings "And we don't give up till we run out of desire".

== Reception ==
"Shine Ya Light" was met with positive reception from music critics upon release. In reviewing Ora, Fred Thomas from AllMusic deemed the song, along with "How We Do (Party)" (2012) and "R.I.P." (2012), as "meticulously constructed anthems of partying, empowerment, and romance". Ryan Porter for Flare labelled the song as a "stadium slow jam". Julien Goncalves of Pure Charts praised the "street style", with it being reminiscent of Ora's previous singles from the album. Claudiu Petru Ciubotaru from Daily Magazine found the message of the song to be "for each of us, to shine [...] as much as possible". Hannah Crompton for River Online felt that "this song will not do as well as her previous tracks because it sounds so different and cannot be categorised into one genre of music". "Shine Ya Light" debuted at number 47 on the UK Singles Chart issue dated 10 November 2012 and reached its peak at number 10 a week later, standing as Ora's fifth charting single in the UK. In 2019, the song received a silver certification by the British Phonographic Industry (BPI) for selling 200,000 units in the country. The song also reached number 10 on the Scottish Singles Chart and number 25 on the Irish Singles Chart. It was further listed at number 13 on the Billboard Euro Digital Song Sales ranking for the week ending 24 November 2012.

== Music video and promotion ==
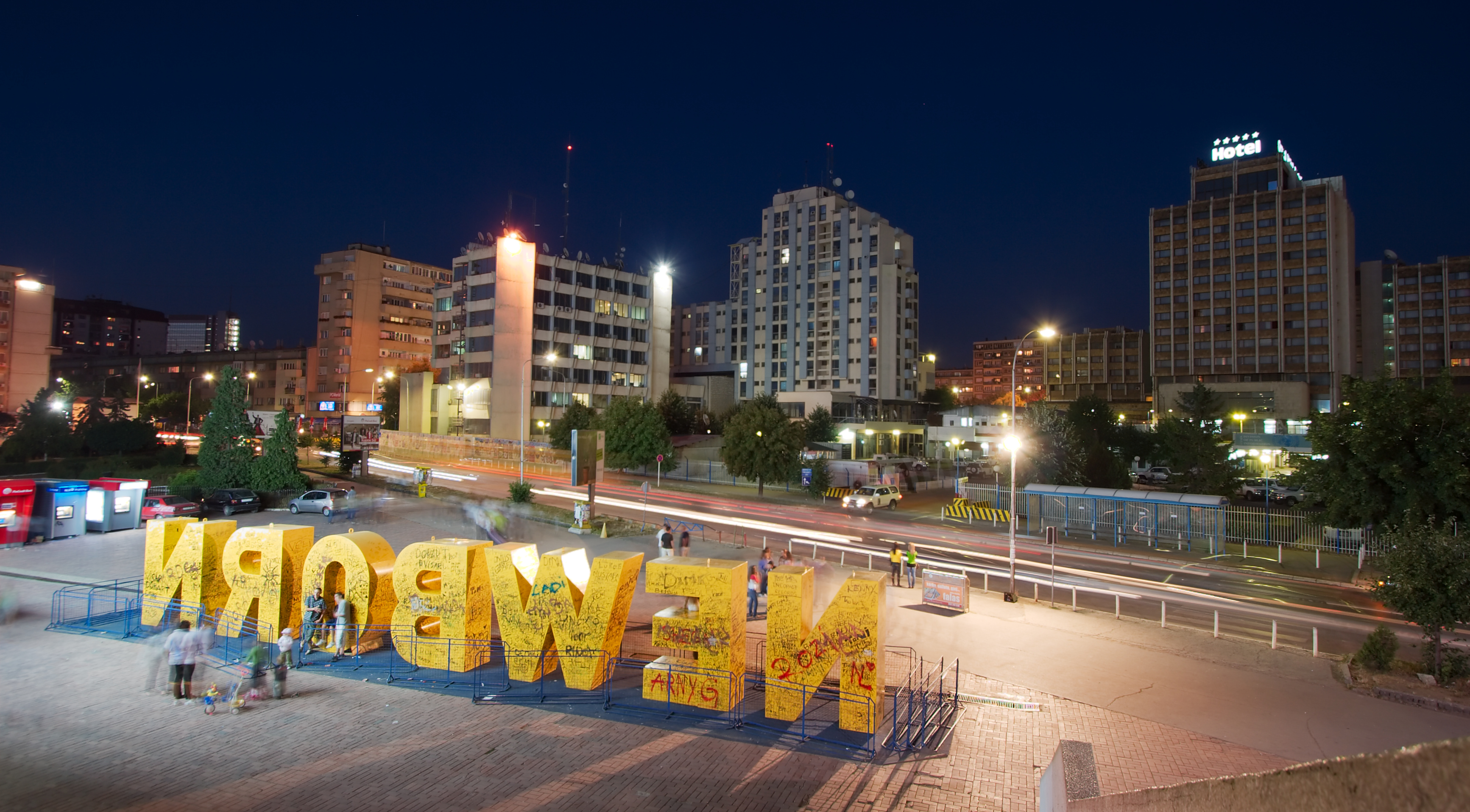
The music video for "Shina Ya Light" was filmed in Ora's hometown of Pristina, Kosovo. The video features a prominent scene of the singer performing a traditional Albanian dance on top of the Newborn monument in Pristina.

The official music video for "Shine Ya Light" was uploaded to Ora's YouTube channel on 27 October 2012, preceded by the release of a trailer on 25 September. A series of behind-the-scenes footage from various stages of filming the video was published on the aforementioned platform on 2 November 2012. Taking place in Ora's birthplace Pristina, Kosovo, the music video was filmed on five different settings across the city over two days. It was directed by British director Emil Nava, who also directed the video for the singer's previous single "R.I.P.". The attires worn by her in the visual included designs by French fashion designers Christian Louboutin and Jean Paul Gaultier. In talking about the video's location and given her Kosovo Albanian heritage, Ora stated, "I can't explain to you what this means [...] This is the only place I wanted to shoot my video." During an interview with Rap-Up, the singer further explained, "I'm proud to kind of put [Kosovo] on the map [...] We are a very patriotic country, so we always try to mention us wherever we can because it's such a great place."

The four-minute and eight-second video is a tribute to Ora's homeland Kosovo, exploring her return and journey in the country. It opens with a dark-lighted shot of Ora wearing a gold outfit and a baseball cap being introduced on stage to a cheering crowd of people. Next a close-up view of the singer wearing a kerchief over her mouth in the style of the Kosovo flag, positioned on top of a rooftop with a panorama view of Pristina behind her, is presented. She is then progressively shown with a dog on a leash walking across the streets, accompanied by a group of children. As the video continues, the singer performs from the back of a motorcycle as she and a group of other bikers ride down the city next to a police escort. These scenes are interspersed with shots of Pristina and several popular monuments. During the final scene, she is depicted on top of the Newborn monument performing to the song and dancing a traditional Albanian dance, also being surrounded by a large number of people.

X. Alexander for Idolator praised the music video and felt that there "is a majorly positive vibe coming off [...] the accompanying visuals". Eric Diep from Complex complimented the video for "carry[ing] a motivational message, which [Ora] manag[ed] to convey". For Pure Charts, Julien Goncalves further wrote that "[she] sends a message of hope. It is therefore logical that she takes us to Pristina in Kosovo, her hometown." Courtney E. Smith for CBS News highlighted the singer's overall fashion and added that it "[is] almost as big a star as Kosovo". Darwin L. from MTV shared similar sentiments, applauding her fashion, writing that "it wouldn't be a Rita Ora video without a fashion show, right? Let's break it down!"

To promote the song, Ora provided several live performances of "Shine Ya Light" throughout 2012. She performed the song live on the American talk show Jimmy Kimmel Live! in September and the ninth series of the British reality talent show of The X Factor in November. Footage of the singer performing the song was also broadcast during Vevo's Lift campaign in June as well as MTV's Unplugged series in September.

== Track listing ==
- Digital download and streaming
1. "Shine Ya Light" – 3:30
- Digital download and streaming – Remixes
1. "Shine Ya Light" (The 2 Bears Full Length) – 5:29
2. "Shine Ya Light" (The Bimbo Jones Dub) – 7:11
3. "Shine Ya Light" (Dannic Club Mix) – 4:59
4. "Shine Ya Light" (Gregor Salto Remix) – 5:53

== Charts ==
Chart performance for "Shine Ya Light"
Chart (2012)	Peak position
CIS Airplay (TopHit)	174
Euro Digital Song Sales (Billboard)	13
Ireland (IRMA)	25
Scottish Singles Sales (Official Charts)	9
UK Singles (Official Charts)	10

== Certifications ==
Certifications and sales for "Shine Ya Light"
Region	Certification	Certified units/sales
United Kingdom (BPI)	Silver	200,000^{‡}
^{‡} Sales+streaming figures based on certification alone.

== Release history ==
Release dates and formats for "Shine Ya Light"
Region	Date	Format	Label(s)	Ref.
United Kingdom	17 October 2012	Radio airplay	Columbia; Roc Nation	
Italy	16 November 2012	Radio airplay	Sony	
