= Turn Back (song) =

Single by K Koke featuring Maverick Sabre

from the album I Ain't Perfect
- Released: 23 November 2012
- Recorded: 2012
- Genre: Hip hop
- Length: 3:51
- Label: RCA Records
- Songwriter(s): K Koke, Dominic Miller, Syed Naqui, Kaywan Qazzar, Maverick Sabre, Gordon Sumners.

K Koke singles chronology
"Turn Back" (2012)	"Lay Down Your Weapons" (2013)

Maverick Sabre singles chronology
"These Days" (2012)	"Turn Back" (2012)	"Emotion (Ain't Nobody)" (2014)

"Turn Back" is a song by English rapper of Greek Cypriot descent K Koke, featuring vocals from Irish singer Maverick Sabre. The track was released on 23 November 2012 as a digital download in the United Kingdom. The song was released as the lead single from his debut studio album I Ain't Perfect (2013). It has peaked to number 70 on the UK Singles Chart and number 7 on the UK R&B Chart.

The song samples "Shape of My Heart" by Sting, famously sampled in "The Message" by Nas.

== Music video ==
A music video to accompany the release of "Turn Back" was first released onto YouTube on 26 October 2012 at a total length of four minutes and twelve seconds.

== Track listing ==
Digital download
No.	Title	Length
1.	"Turn Back" (feat. Maverick Sabre)	3:51
2.	"The Only One"	3:01

== Charts ==
Chart (2012)	Peak position
UK Hip Hop/R&B (OCC)	7
UK Singles (Official Charts Company)	70

== Release history ==
Region	Date	Format	Label
United Kingdom	23 November 2012	Digital download	RCA Records
