= Ora (Rita Ora album) =

Studio album by Rita Ora
- Released: 24 August 2012
- Length: 42:44
- Labels: Roc Nation; Columbia
- Producers: The Runners; Terius "The-Dream" Nash; The Monarch; Will Adams; Stargate; Chase & Status; Major Lazer; Michael Linney; Brandon Linney; Fraser T Smith; Chris Loco; Daniel Stein; Wez Clarke; The Invisible Men; Greg Kurstin; Jules De Martino; Diplo

Rita Ora chronology
Ora (2012)	Phoenix (2018)

Singles from Ora
- 1. "How We Do (Party)" Released: 20 March 2012; 2. "R.I.P." Released: 6 May 2012; 3. "Shine Ya Light" Released: 2 November 2012; 4. "Radioactive" Released: 11 February 2013

Ora is the debut studio album by the British singer Rita Ora. It was released on 24 August 2012 through Roc Nation and Columbia Records. Musically, Ora is mainly a pop album that incorporates dance elements. For the recording of Ora, Ora enlisted the help of producers such as will.i.am, The-Dream, The Runners, The Monarch, Stargate, Chase & Status, Greg Kurstin, Jules De Martino and Diplo.

The album's release was preceded by two singles—"How We Do (Party)" and "R.I.P."—both of which peaked atop the UK Singles Chart and achieved standard chart positions in charts worldwide. The album also includes the DJ Fresh collaboration, "Hot Right Now", which is featured as a bonus track. Ora debuted at number 1 on the UK Albums Chart and was certified platinum by the British Phonographic Industry. It also peaked at number two in Ireland and reached Gold status in New Zealand.

== Background and development ==
In 2008, Ora signed to American record label, Roc Nation. She recorded an album's worth of material with a view to release it, but her label advised against it. Instead Ora began work on different songs to be included on her debut album. The covert art was photographed by Zoe McConnell. Ora described it as: "Everything was inspired basically by being bossy, by being independent, and by taking your own. We made sure that everything had character." She also explained the title of the album: "Ora is my surname, but it also means time in my country, Kosovo, in Albanian, and it definitely took me a long time to get this album – three years to be exact."

== Composition ==
When Ora spoke on the album she stated: "The crazy thing is I wanted the album to sound exactly like the subway, almost as if its just so free and raw." When speaking about the sound of the album and its concept, Ora said the album "definitely has pop in it, but (...) you can hear influences of jazz in there, you can hear influences of Monica and Aaliyah, and then you can hear Gwen Stefani." Ora described the sound of her album saying "I love No Doubt and Eric Clapton and Bruce Springsteen. It's old school mixed with a pop kind of stream with a grit. It's got attitude to it but it's not ignorant. It's just a cool album in my eyes."

== Promotion ==
=== Singles ===
"How We Do (Party)" was released as the album's lead single in North America, Australia and New Zealand on 20 March 2012. The single peaked at number 5 in New Zealand and at number 9 in Australia. , while also reaching number 62 on the US Billboard Hot 100. In August 2012, it was released as the second single in the UK, Ireland and the rest of Europe. The song reached number 1 in Ireland, becoming her first Irish number-one single. It also reached number 1 in the UK, becoming her third number one single (second as a solo artist) and making Ora the first artist in 2012 to score three number 1 singles on the UK charts.

"R.I.P.", featuring Tinie Tempah, was released as the lead single in Ireland on 4 May 2012, in the United Kingdom on 6 May 2012, and the rest of Europe. The song debuted at the top of the UK Singles Chart, becoming her first solo number-one single, and second overall. It was released as the album's second single in New Zealand, Australia and North America. "Shine Ya Light" was officially released as the third UK single on 4 November 2012. It peaked at number ten in the UK Singles Chart, making it Ora's fourth top 10 UK single overall in 2012. It also served as a third single in Ireland, where it peaked at number 25. "Radioactive" was released as the fourth and last single from Ora, on 11 February 2013. The song peaked at number 18 in the UK and number 23 in Australia.

=== Promotional singles ===
"Roc the Life" was released in the United Kingdom on 23 July 2012 as a promotional single, with a music video that featured footage of Ora on her UK tour appearing in September. A music video for "Facemelt" was directed by British photographer Rankin and it was released on Hunger TV on 30 April.

=== Live performances ===
In April, Ora sang a live acoustic version of "How We Do (Party)" on Wired 96.5 radio in Philadelphia. In April 2012, Ora performed "How We Do (Party)" and "R.I.P." live while supporting Drake on his Club Paradise Tour in the UK. Ora performed "R.I.P." live in studio for 4Music's show, The Crush, with a live band. On 23 June 2012, Ora performed at Radio 1's Big Weekend, where she sang "Facemelt", "Roc the Life", "How We Do (Party)", "Shine Ya Light" and "R.I.P." Ora performed at various British music festivals in 2012, including Wireless Festival, T in the Park 2012 and V Festival. She performed "Shine Ya Light" on The X Factor on 4 November 2012. On 18 August 2012, Ora performed at The Jonathan Ross Show.

=== Radioactive Tour ===
In January and February 2013 she embarked on a 12-date UK tour where according to The Independent, "stage-school trained Ora can rely on more traditional showbiz values to succeed" to put on a show. She worked with deceased designer Emilio Pucci on aspects of the presentation of the show. Ora was joined by Tinie Tempah when performing "R.I.P." in London and Manchester. Iggy Azalea and Draper served as supporting acts.

Tour dates
Date	City	Country	Venue
United Kingdom
28 January 2013	Manchester	England	Manchester Academy
29 January 2013	Newcastle	England	O_{2} Academy
30 January 2013	Glasgow	Scotland	O_{2} Academy
1 February 2013	Sheffield	England	O_{2} Academy
2 February 2013	Cardiff	Wales	Cardiff University Students' Union
5 February 2013	London	England	Shepherd's Bush Empire
6 February 2013	London	England	Shepherd's Bush Empire
8 February 2013	Bournemouth	England	O_{2} Academy
9 February 2013	Birmingham	England	O_{2} Academy
11 February 2013	Bristol	England	O_{2} Academy
12 February 2013	York	England	Barbican Centre
13 February 2013	Leeds	England	O_{2} Academy

== Critical reception ==
Professional ratings
Review scores
Source	Rating
AllMusic	4/5 stars
Bring the Noise	7/10
Contactmusic.com	7/10
The Digital Fix	6/10
Digital Spy	3/5 stars
Drowned in Sound	6/10
The Guardian	2/5 stars
musicOMH	3/5 stars
The New Zealand Herald	3/5 stars
Time Out	3/5 stars

Ora has received mixed reviews from music critics. At AllMusic, Fred Thomas alluded to how the album "manages to be more captivating than her peers by merit of her real approach to her songs, but sonically the album is somewhat interchangeable", but suggested that multiple listens make this release a "masterpiece of unrepentantly commercial pop". Tamsyn Wilce of Bring the Noise suggested that the singer "stick with making the brilliant pop hits as seen in the first half of the album". At Contactmusic.com, Dom Gourlay affirmed that the release "is still a worthy introduction to the world of arguably the UK's most credible and slightly left of centre pop star in years". Digital Spy's Robert Copsey stated that "the culmination of 24 months of trend watching, market positioning and image primping on the resulting Ora does, more often than not, make it feel like a highly calculated exercise, but that doesn't mean she hasn't turned out some genuinely well-crafted songs".

Holly Newins of The Digital Fix told that "is surprisingly convincing, especially with the dance hall influence that is blatant across the album", which she found that the listener will have songs that they will and will not be a fan of. Furthermore, she said because Jay-Z's involvement that "the ratio of hits to misses doesn't matter anyway", and that he will make sure Rita Ora "will be on your radio for a long time to come". Drowned in Sound's Marcus J. Moore called the album "certainly catchy, and the maker is enthralling", yet the album lacks "any intricate rhythms here and the messages aren't profound". At The Guardian, Michael Cragg found that "there's just too much anonymity". At The Independent, Andy Gill evoked that "the album does not give evidence Rita Ora is anything like Gwen Stefani, which she considers her influence, but rather a Rihanna coming from the United Kingdom". Laurence Green of musicOMH vowed that "the defining feeling here is of something completely and utterly 'produced' – a factory line-up of the biggest names and beats in contemporary pop, machine tooled into something so sleek it's in danger of slipping through the ether entirely". Scott Kara of The New Zealand Herald told that on the release "she wears her influences on her sleeve". At Time Out, Sharon O'Connell criticised the album because it contains "so little of Ora here", and suggested that "all Ora really gets to do is channel a sound now so ubiquitous it's carpet-bombed our consciousness".

== Commercial performance ==
Ora debuted at number one on the UK Albums Chart with first-week sales of 41,509 copies. Throughout 2012, the album sold 242,500 copies, becoming the thirty-fifth best selling album of the year. In 2013, the album was certified platinum by the British Phonographic Industry (BPI).

== Track listing ==
Ora – Standard edition
No.	Title	Writer(s)	Producer(s)	Length
1.	"Facemelt"	James Fauntleroy II; Harley Justice Wertheimer; David Taylor	Switch	1:33
2.	"Roc the Life"	Rita Ora; Terius "The-Dream" Nash	Nash	4:01
3.	"How We Do (Party)"	Andrew Harr; Jermaine Jackson; Andre Davidson; Sean Davidson; Bonnie McKee; Kelly Sheehan; Alexander Delicata; Hal Davis; Berry Gordy Jr.; Osten Harvey Jr.; Willie Hutch; Christopher Wallace; Bob West	The Runners; The Monarch^{[a]}; Kuk Harrell^{[b]}; Sheehan^{[b]}	4:07
4.	"R.I.P." (featuring Tinie Tempah)	Aubrey Graham; Renee Wisdom; Saul Milton; William Kennard; Tor Erik Hermansen; Mikkel Storleer Eriksen; Patrick Chukwuemeka Okogwu; Nneka Egbuna; Farhad Samadzada	Chase & Status; Stargate	3:48
5.	"Radioactive"	Sia Furler; Greg Kurstin	Kurstin; Furler^{[b]}	4:11
6.	"Shine Ya Light"	Fraser T Smith; LP; Chris Loco	Smith; Loco; Nikki Flores^{[b]}	3:30
7.	"Love and War" (featuring J. Cole)	Ester Dean; Eriksen; Hermansen; Jermaine Cole	Stargate; David "DQ" Quiñones^{[b]}	3:35
8.	"Uneasy"	Ora; Jules De Martino; Katie White; Makeba Riddick	De Martino; Stargate^{[c]}; Shea Taylor^{[a]}; Andrea Martin^{[b]}	3:02
9.	"Fall in Love" (featuring will.i.am)	William Adams; Alexis Latrobe	will.i.am	4:13
10.	"Been Lying"	Ora; Rachel Rabin; Edwin Serrano; Michael Linney; Brandon Linney	M. Linney; B. Linney; Lil Eddie^{[b]}; Rabin^{[b]}	3:44
11.	"Hello, Hi, Goodbye"	Nash; Taylor; Thomas Wesley Pentz; Ariel Rechtshaid	Switch; Diplo^{[a]}; Martin^{[b]}	3:58
12.	"Hot Right Now" (DJ Fresh featuring Rita Ora) (bonus track)	Dan Stein; The Invisible Men	DJ Fresh; The Invisible Men^{[b]}	3:02
Total length:				42:44

Ora – Germany deluxe edition (bonus tracks)
No.	Title	Writer(s)	Producer(s)	Length
13.	"How We Do (Party)" (acoustic)	Harr; Jackson; Davidson; Davidson; McKee; Sheehan; Davis; Gordy Jr.; Harvey Jr.; Hutch; Wallace; West	The Runners; The Monarch	4:20
14.	"How We Do (Party)" (PaperCha$er Remix)	Harr; Jackson; Davidson; Davidson; McKee; Sheehan; Davis; Gordy Jr.; Harvey Jr.; Hutch; Wallace; West	The Runners; The Monarch	6:15
15.	"R.I.P." (featuring Tinie Tempah; Delta Heavy Remix)	Graham; Wisdom; Milton; Kennard; Hermansen; Eriksen; Okogwu; Egbuna; Samadzada	Stargate; Chase & Status	4:15
Total length:				57:34

Ora – Digital deluxe edition (bonus tracks)
No.	Title	Writer(s)	Producer(s)	Length
13.	"Crazy Girl"	Nash; Ora; Pentz	Diplo	3:35
14.	"Young, Single & Sexy"	Riddick; Eriksen; Hermansen; Espen Lind; Amund Bjorklund	Stargate	3:45
15.	"Meet Ya"	Ben Harrison; Brian Kennedy; Fauntleroy	Fauntleroy	2:17
Total length:				52:21

Ora – Germany, Switzerland and Austria digital deluxe edition (bonus tracks)
No.	Title	Writer(s)	Producer(s)	Length
16.	"R.I.P." (featuring Tinie Tempah; Seamus Haji Remix)	Graham; Wisdom; Milton; Kennard; Hermansen; Eriksen; Okogwu; Egbuna; Samadzada	Stargate; Chase & Status	7:09
Total length:				59:30

Ora – Japan edition (bonus track)
No.	Title	Writer(s)	Producer(s)	Length
16.	"How We Do (Party)" (acoustic)	Harr; Jackson; Davidson; Davidson; McKee; Sheehan; Davis; Gordy Jr.; Harvey Jr.; Hutch; Wallace; West	The Runners; The Monarch	4:20
Total length:				56:41

Ora – iTunes Store deluxe edition (bonus video)
No.	Title	Length
16.	"Ora Track-by-Track" (video)	16:25

Ora – Germany, Switzerland and Austria iTunes Store deluxe edition (bonus videos)
No.	Title	Length
17.	"R.I.P." (music video)	3:50
18.	"R.I.P." (featuring Tinie Tempah; Behind the Scenes)	7:02
19.	"How We Do (Party)" (music video)	3:58
20.	"How We Do (Party)" (Behind the Scenes)	2:07

Notes

- ^{^[a]} signifies an additional producer
- ^{^[b]} signifies a vocal producer
- ^{^[c]} signifies a co-producer

Sample credits

- "Facemelt" is originally "Brap" written and performed by Bart B More with original vocals performed by Rita Ora.
- "R.I.P." interpolates portions of "Heartbeat" written by N. Egbuna and F. Samadzada and performed by Nneka.
- "Fall in Love" interpolates portions of "Handguns (Dada Life Remix)" written by Alexis Latrobe.

== Charts ==
=== Weekly charts ===
Weekly sales chart performance for Ora
Chart (2012)	Peak position
Australian Albums (ARIA)	24
Austrian Albums (Ö3 Austria)	51
Belgian Albums (Ultratop Flanders)	101
German Albums (Offizielle Top 100)	63
Irish Albums (IRMA)	2
Japanese Albums (Oricon)	74
New Zealand Albums (RMNZ)	24
Scottish Albums (Official Charts)	1
Swiss Albums (Schweizer Hitparade)	15
UK Albums (Official Charts)	1

=== Year-end charts ===
2012 year-end chart performance for Ora
Chart (2012)	Position
UK Albums (OCC)	35

2013 year-end chart performance for Ora
Chart (2013)	Position
UK Albums (OCC)	123

== Certifications ==
Certifications for Ora
Region	Certification	Certified units/sales
New Zealand (RMNZ)	Gold	7,500^{‡}
United Kingdom (BPI)	Platinum	366,064
^{‡} Sales+streaming figures based on certification alone.

== Release history ==
Release formats for Ora
Region	Date	Format	Label	Edition
Ireland	24 August 2012	CD, digital download	Roc Nation, Columbia	Standard, deluxe
United Kingdom	27 August 2012	CD, digital download	Roc Nation, Columbia	Standard, deluxe
Australia	15 September 2012	CD, digital download	Roc Nation, Columbia	Standard
Germany	19 October 2012	CD, digital download	Roc Nation, Columbia	Standard, deluxe
Portugal	21 January 2013	CD, digital download	Roc Nation, Columbia	Standard, deluxe
United States	11 September 2020	Digital download, streaming	Roc Nation, Columbia	Standard, deluxe

== See also ==
- List of 2012 albums
- List of UK Albums Chart number ones of the 2010s
