= R.I.P. (Rita Ora song) =

2012 single by Rita Ora featuring Tinie Tempah

Single by Rita Ora featuring Tinie Tempah

from the album Ora
- Released: 6 May 2012
- Genre: Dubstep; pop
- Length: 3:48; 6:24 (Gregor Salto Remix); 7:10 (Seamus Haji Remix); 4:16 (Delta Heavy Dubstep Remix)
- Label: Columbia; Roc Nation
- Songwriters: Aubrey Graham; F. Samadzada; Mikkel Eriksen; Nneka Egbuna; Renee Wisdom; Saul Milton; Tinie Tempah; Tor Erik Hermansen; William Kennard
- Producers: Chase & Status; Stargate

Rita Ora singles chronology
"How We Do (Party)" (2012)	"R.I.P." (2012)	"Shine Ya Light" (2012)

Tinie Tempah singles chronology
"Angels & Stars" (2012)	"R.I.P." (2012)	"Drinking from the Bottle" (2013)

Music video
- "R.I.P." on YouTube

"R.I.P." is a song by the British singer Rita Ora featuring British rapper Tinie Tempah from her debut studio album, Ora (2012). The song was written by Aubrey Graham (Drake), F. Samadzada, Mikkel Eriksen, Nneka Egbuna, Renee Wisdom, Saul Milton, Tinie Tempah, Tor Erik Hermansen and William Kennard, and produced by Chase & Status and Stargate. It was released as the second single from the album for digital download and streaming by Columbia and Roc Nation in various countries on 6 May 2012. Sampling Chase & Status' remix of Nneka's "Heartbeat" (2008), it is a dubstep and pop song, incorporating R&B, rave and rock elements. Its lyrics are an ode to a lost love and the process to overcome that situation.

"R.I.P." received mixed to positive responses from music critics upon release, with some applauding the song's musical arrangement, lyrics and Ora's vocal delivery, and others criticizing Tempah's rap verse, whilst also dismissing the song's similarities to Rihanna's material. The song topped the record charts of Scotland and the United Kingdom, marking her second number-one single on the UK Singles Chart. It reached the top 10 in Australia and the top 50 among others in Denmark, Germany, Ireland, New Zealand and Switzerland. It further peaked at number three on the US Billboard Bubbling Under Hot 100 and number one on the Dance Club Songs chart. The song attained a gold certification by IFPI Danmark in Denmark, as well as a platinum certification from the Australian Recording Industry Association (ARIA) in Australia and British Phonographic Industry (BPI) in the UK, respectively.

The official music video for "R.I.P." was directed by Emil Nava and released to YouTube on 4 April 2012. Filmed in East London, the video depicts Ora and Tinie Tempah in a warehouse performing the song on different settings. To further promote the song, she performed "R.I.P." on several occasions, including at the 2012 MTV Europe Music Awards and The X Factor Australia. The song earned multiple award nominations, including the award of the Song of the Year at the 2013 Brit Awards.

== Background and composition ==
"R.I.P." was written by Aubrey Graham (Drake), F. Samadzada, Mikkel Eriksen, Nneka Egbuna, Renee Wisdom, Saul Milton, Tinie Tempah, Tor Erik Hermansen and William Kennard, and produced by Chase & Status and Stargate. It was rumoured that Drake initially wrote the song for Barbadian singer Rihanna, intended for her fifth studio album Loud (2010). However, Ora stated, "[the song] wasn't written for [her]. But even if it was played to her, I do not care. As soon as I heard it, I said it was mine. I was going to fight for that song. And I was right, it went to number one." "R.I.P." was released for digital download and streaming by Columbia and Roc Nation on 6 May 2012 as the second single from Ora's debut studio album Ora (2012). Several remixes, which were done by Delta Heavy, Gregor Salto and Seamus Haji, accompanied the single's release as part of an extended play (EP). The song was further serviced to contemporary hit radio formats in the United States on 28 August 2012. The vocals of Ora in the song span from a low note of A_{3} to a high note of C_{5}. It is composed in 4/4 time and the key of B minor with a tempo of 72 beats per minute and a chord progression of Bm–Gmaj-A. Musically, "R.I.P." is a dubstep and pop song, utilising R&B, rave and rock elements as well as a sample of English duo Chase & Status' remix of Nigerian singer Nneka's single "Heartbeat" (2008). The song is an ode to a lost love and the process to overcome that situation. During the lyrics, Ora sings, "R.I.P. to the girl you used to see, her days are over/ I decided to give you all of me, baby come closer."

== Reception ==
"R.I.P." was met with mixed to positive reviews from music critics upon release. While reviewing Ora, Fred Thomas from AllMusic deemed the song, along with "How We Do (Party)" (2012) and "Shine Ya Light" (2012), as "meticulously constructed anthems of partying, empowerment, and romance". In a positive review, Jenna Hally Rubenstein for MTV lauded the collaboration between Ora and Tinie Tempah and went on to compliment her vocal delivery as "lush and sultry". Marc Hogan for Spin highlighted the song's "simple yet distinctive seduction" lyrics as well as its music and "celebratory" energy. He further concluded that "['the song'] makes it amply clear why she would be a good match for the Rihanna-collaborating British softies". Labeling it as "epic", Jenn Selby for Glamour wrote, "If [Ora]'s not Rihanna-massive this time next year, we'll eat our own high tops." Eric Diep for Complex described the song as "seductive" and noted its ability, stating: "It's still a little early to pick out summer anthems, but [it] has the potential to smash the airwaves." In a negative review, Rebecca Schiller for NME decried the song's lyrics and commented it to be a "mass-market pop fodder".

As Ora's second chart-topping single, "R.I.P." debuted at number one on the UK Singles Chart issue dated 19 May 2012, spending two consecutive weeks at the position. In 2018, the song was awarded a platinum certification by the British Phonographic Industry (BPI) for shifting 600,000 units in the United Kingdom. In Australia, it peaked at number 10 on the ARIA Singles Chart and also received a platinum certification from the Australian Recording Industry Association (ARIA) for selling more than 70,000 units. The song also charted in New Zealand, reaching number 28 on the New Zealand Singles Chart issue dated 23 March 2012. It further appeared on the charts in German-speaking Europe, peaking at number 36 in Germany, number 46 in Switzerland and number 51 in Austria. In the US, the song reached number one on the US Billboard Dance Club Songs ranking and number three on the Bubbling Under Hot 100 chart. Elsewhere, it reached number one in Scotland, number 11 in Ireland, number 44 in the Flanders region of Belgium and number 89 in the Netherlands. In Denmark, the song peaked at number 26 and further received a gold certification by IFPI Danmark. "R.I.P." attained multiple nominations throughout 2012, including one for the Best Video at the MOBO Awards, for the Best Urban Video at the UK Music Video Awards, for the Best Single at the Urban Music Awards and for the Song of the Year at the Brit Awards.

== Music video and promotion ==
A shot from the music video of "R.I.P.", depicting Rita Ora and Tinie Tempah in a dark setting, performing the song together.

Preceded by the release of a teaser on 2 April 2012, the music video for "R.I.P." was uploaded to Ora's official YouTube channel on 4 April. The video was filmed in a warehouse in East London and was directed by British director Emil Nava. It begins with a scene of Ora walking through a moderately-lit surrounding, with light entering from a window next to her. In the following, she carries on to perform along to the song around the warehouse as well as next to a red-coloured vehicle cut in half embedded in the cement of the building's foundation. In another scene, Tinie Tempah is standing next to her, rapping to the camera, while she dances back to back with him against a dark grey setting. Further interspersed scenes portray several headshots of Ora singing directly to the camera. Devin for Rap-Up commended Ora's appearance and wrote, "[it] flaunts her drop-dead gorgeous looks, impeccable swag, and beanie collection", further adding that "her British pal Tinie Tempah injects some attitude". Rubenstein for MTV also praised her and the rapper's appearance in the video, writing that "not much goes on in the video except for tons of vanity shots of Rita looking exceptionally hot", continuing, "when you've got a scorching record and two extremely attractive people in the same room, there's really not much else to do except to watch them be hot". Becky Bain for Idolator wrote that Ora came off "like a second-hand Rihanna, from her wardrobe to the Talk That Talk-cribbing song itself".

To promote the song, Ora performed "R.I.P." on several occasions throughout 2012. The singer performed the song, including as an opening act for Canadian musician Drake's Club Paradise Tour in March, at the 2012 Wireless Festival in July, on The X Factor Australia in September, on the Late Show with David Letterman in October, as well as at the 2012 MTV Europe Music Awards in November. She further presented an acoustic version of the song for Billboard's virtual show The Juice in May and MTV's televised series MTV Unplugged in September.

== Track listing ==
- Digital download and streaming
1. "R.I.P." – 3:48
- Digital download and streaming – Extended play (EP)
1. "R.I.P." – 3:48
2. "R.I.P." (Gregor Salto Remix) – 6:24
3. "R.I.P." (Seamus Haji Remix) – 7:10
4. "R.I.P." (Delta Heavy Dubstep Remix) – 4:16

== Credits and personnel ==
Credits adapted from Spotify.

Vocal credits

- Rita Ora – lead artist
- Tinie Tempah – featured artist

Technical credits

- Tinie Tempah – songwriting
- Aubrey Graham – songwriting
- F. Samadzada – songwriting
- Mikkel Eriksen – songwriting
- Nneka Egbuna – songwriting
- Renee Wisdom – songwriting
- Saul Milton – songwriting
- Tor Erik Hermansen – songwriting
- William Kennard – songwriting
- Chase & Status – production
- Stargate – production

== Charts ==
=== Weekly charts ===
Weekly chart performance for "R.I.P."
Chart (2012)	Peak position
Australia (ARIA)	10
Austria (Ö3 Austria Top 40)	51
Belgium (Ultratop 50 Flanders)	44
Czech Republic Airplay (ČNS IFPI)	51
Denmark (Tracklisten)	26
Euro Digital Song Sales (Billboard)	4
Germany (GfK)	36
Ireland (IRMA)	11
Netherlands (Single Top 100)	89
New Zealand (Recorded Music NZ)	28
Scottish Singles Sales (Official Charts)	1
Slovakia Airplay (ČNS IFPI)	64
Switzerland (Schweizer Hitparade)	46
UK Singles (Official Charts)	1
US Bubbling Under Hot 100 (Billboard)	3
US Dance Club Songs (Billboard)	1
US Pop Airplay (Billboard)	28
US Rhythmic Airplay (Billboard)	19

=== Year-end charts ===
Year-end chart performance for "R.I.P."
Chart (2012)	Position
UK Singles (OCC)	28
US Dance Club Songs (Billboard)	10

== Certifications ==
Certifications and sales for "R.I.P."
Region	Certification	Certified units/sales
Australia (ARIA)	Platinum	70,000^{^}
Denmark (IFPI Danmark)	Gold	15,000^{^}
New Zealand (RMNZ)	Gold	7,500^{*}
United Kingdom (BPI)	Platinum	600,000^{‡}
^{*} Sales figures based on certification alone.^{^} Shipments figures based on certification alone.^{‡} Sales+streaming figures based on certification alone.

== Release history ==
Release dates and formats for "R.I.P."
Region	Date	Format(s)	Label(s)	Ref.
Various	6 May 2012	Digital download; streaming	Columbia; Roc Nation	
United States	28 August 2012	Contemporary hit radio	Columbia; Roc Nation	

== See also ==
- List of Billboard Dance Club Songs number ones of 2012
- List of UK singles chart number ones of the 2010s
