= How We Do (Party) =

2012 debut single by Rita Ora

Single by Rita Ora

from the album Ora
- Released: 20 March 2012
- Genre: Dance-pop
- Length: 4:06
- Label: Columbia; Roc Nation
- Songwriters: Alexander Delicata; Andre Davidson; Andrew Harr; Berry Gordy Jr.; Bob West; Bonnie McKee; Christopher Wallace; Hal Davis; Jermaine Jackson; Kelly Sheehan; Osten Harvey Jr.; Sean Davidson; Willie Hutch
- Producers: Kelly Sheehan; Kuk Harrell; The Monarch; The Runners

Rita Ora singles chronology
"Hot Right Now" (2012)	"How We Do (Party)" (2012)	"R.I.P." (2012)

Music video
- "How We Do (Party)" on YouTube

"How We Do (Party)" is a song by the British singer Rita Ora from her debut studio album, Ora (2012). The song was written by Andrew Harr, Bonnie McKee, Christopher Wallace, Hal Davis, Jermaine Jackson, Willie Hutch and seven others, and produced by Kelly Sheehan, Kuk Harrell, the Monarch and the Runners. It was released as the lead single from the album for digital download and streaming by Columbia and Roc Nation in various countries on 20 March 2012. Sampling the refrain from the Notorious B.I.G.'s "Party and Bullshit" (1993), it is a dance and pop song, exploring the story of Ora warding off her hangover by falling in love with her love interest. The song received moderate responses from music critics, who mostly applauded the music and sound, while others compared it to the works of Jessie J, Katy Perry and Lady Gaga.

"How We Do (Party)" topped the record charts of Ireland, Scotland and the United Kingdom, and reached the top 10 in Australia, Japan and New Zealand. The song further peaked at number 62 on the US Billboard Hot 100 and number one on the Dance Club Songs as well as number 68 on the Canadian Hot 100. It attained a platinum certification from the British Phonographic Industry (BPI) in the UK and a gold certification from Recorded Music New Zealand (RMNZ) in New Zealand, as well as a double platinum certification from the Australian Recording Industry Association (ARIA) in Australia. An accompanying music video was directed by Marc Klasfeld and released to YouTube on 17 April 2012, depicting the singer with a group of people on a party in different settings. It attracted praise for Ora's signature-described appearance with red lipstick and platinum blonde hair. To promote the song, she performed it on several occasions, including The Jonathan Ross Show, MTV Unplugged and Isle of MTV.

== Background and composition ==
"How We Do (Party)" was written by Alexander Delicata, Andre Davidson, Andrew Harr, Berry Gordy Jr., Bob West, Bonnie McKee, Christopher Wallace, Hal Davis, Jermaine Jackson, Kelly Sheehan, Osten Harvey Jr., Sean Davidson and Willie Hutch. Its production was handled by Sheehan, Kuk Harrell, the Monarch and the Runners. The song was released for digital download and streaming by Columbia and Roc Nation on 20 March 2012 as the lead single from Ora's debut studio album Ora (2012). Several remixes, including ones by Gustavo Scorpio, Laidback Luke, Papercha$er and Sandro Silva, accompanied the single's release as part of an extended play (EP). Musically, "How We Do (Party)" is a dance and pop song, sampling the refrain from American rapper Notorious B.I.G.'s single "Party and Bullshit" (1993). Ora's vocals in the song span from a low note of B_{3} to a high note of E_{5}. The song is composed in 4/4 time and the key of G major with a tempo of 116 beats per minute and a chord progression of G–C-Em-C. Singing over an acoustic guitar, its lyrics explore the story of Ora warding off her hangover by falling in love with her love interest, who is passed out on the floor. Lyrics include: "Cause when the sun sets, baby/ On the avenue/ I get that drunk sex feeling/ Yeah, when I'm with you/ So put your arms around me, baby/ We're tearing up the town/ Cause that's just how we do".

== Reception ==
"How We Do (Party)" was met with moderate responses from music critics upon release. In reviewing Ora, Fred Thomas from AllMusic deemed the song, along with "R.I.P." (2012) and "Shine Ya Light" (2012), as "meticulously constructed anthems of partying, empowerment, and romance". For MTV, Sam Lansky described the song as an "irresponsibly infectious celebratory anthem", while Rebecca Thomas from the same website opined that "the infectious tune dares you [...] to dance along". Mary H.K. Choi of GQ commended the song's appeal as "ear-wormy, clubby, and girl-power anthemic". For Digital Spy, Robert Copsey declared the song a "global-reaching party tune" and went on to praise it for getting better with every listen. He further viewed the song as somewhere between "the carefree nature of Lady Gaga's 'Just Dance' [2008] and the addictiveness of Katy Perry's 'Last Friday Night' [2011]". On a similar note, Laurence Green from MusicOMH further compared it to "Last Friday Night" as well as to Jessie J's "Domino" (2011), stating that it is "so similar you'd be forgiven for thinking a computer managed to subsume and replicate the two songs into this". Chris Richards for The Washington Post felt that "it's sweetly disorienting – like a Kesha lyric trapped in a Miley Cyrus melody".

"How We Do (Party)" debuted at number one on the UK Singles Chart issue dated 25 August 2012. The song became Ora's third chart-topping single in the United Kingdom and spent a total of 19 weeks on the chart. In 2014, it received a platinum certification from the British Phonographic Industry (BPI) for sales and streams of 600,000 units in the country. The song further reached number one on the Irish and Scottish Singles Charts in August 2012, respectively. In Australia, "How We Do (Party)" entered the ARIA Singles Chart at number 41 and reached its summit at number 9 on the chart dated 24 June 2012. The song performed better in New Zealand and reached number five on the New Zealand Singles Chart issue dated 21 May 2012. It received a gold certification from the Recorded Music New Zealand (RMNZ) in New Zealand and a double platinum award from the Australian Recording Industry Association (ARIA) in Australia for selling 7,500 and 140,000 units, respectively. In the United States, "How We Do (Party)" spent three weeks on the Billboard Bubbling Under Hot 100 chart, before entering the Hot 100 at number 96 and reaching its summit at number 62 on the chart dated 7 July 2012. The song also peaked atop the Dance Club Songs chart and reached number 22 on the Mainstream Top 40 and number 28 on the Rhythmic rankings. In Canada, "How We Do (Party)" reached number 68 on the Canadian Singles Chart issue dated 28 July 2012, after debuting on the chart in June. Elsewhere, the song reached number 5 in Japan, number 31 in the Netherlands, number 35 in Austria, number 40 in Denmark and Germany, respectively, number 41 in Switzerland and number 62 in Romania.

== Promotion ==
A prominent scene from the music video of "How We Do (Party)", portraying Rita Ora in a dark-lighted setting with her signature-described appearance, including platinum blonde hair and red lipstick.

The official music video for "How We Do (Party)" was uploaded to Ora's YouTube channel on 17 April 2012, preceded by the release of a teaser, approximately a week before. Behind-the-scenes footage from the song's video was published on the singer's channel on 10 August. Directed by American director Marc Klasfeld, Ora stated that the music video was a big party with "no judgment" along with a bunch of people in there, saying "It's definitely about embracing anyone who wants to come to a party." The video commences with a group of partying people, dancing in a dark-coloured setting and sporting bright clothes. In the following scene, Ora enters the setting and begins to sing the song. Further interspersed shots show the singer partying on several other settings, alternating between a "lush" garden at twilight, a foil-wrapped bedroom and a white-cube space filled with guests, where she uses their torsos as "paint brushes".

Thomas from MTV labelled the video as "effervescent" and compared Ora's appearance throughout the video to that of American singers Faith Evans and Gwen Stefani, writing that "with a red knit cap pulled down over platinum-blond curls, [Ora] called to mind a cross between [...] Evans and Stefani". For the aforementioned website's Lansky, the video has everything, ranging from Viking hats and American flag-embroidered leather jackets to "ferocious" purple suede heels and dip-dyed coloured bathing suits, including Ora in her "signature" red lipstick and "platinum" blonde hair.

On 1 May 2012, Ora performed an acoustic version of the song on Billboard's The Juice episode. At another occasion, the singer presented the song at BBC Radio 1's Hackney Weekend at the Hackney Marshes, London, on 23 June 2012. On 18 August 2012, she gave a performance of it on The Jonathan Ross Show. Another performance took place at the Jingle Bell Ball concert in London on 9 December 2012, closing her performance with the song. Further footage of Ora performing "How We Do (Party)" was broadcast during MTV's Unplugged series on 17 September 2012 as well as on the 11th edition of the Isle of MTV in Floriana, Malta, on 23 June 2013.

== Copyright lawsuit ==
In 2016, American writer Abiodun Oyewole, a founding member of the Last Poets, filed a copyright infringement suit against Ora, rapper Christopher Wallace known as the Notorious B.I.G. and several other songwriters and producers over their use of the phrase "party and bullshit". The phrase appeared on Wallace's single "Party and Bullshit", which Ora sampled on "How We Do (Party)". Oyewole alleged that "[they] publish[ed] and distribute[d] [...] the crescendo, hook, text, lyrics and sound" of his single "When the Revolution Comes" (1968) without his permission. He further stated that the phrase is meant to "challenge[] and encourage[] people to NOT waste time with 'party and bullshit', but to move towards success". On 4 September 2019, the United States District Court for the Southern District of New York judge Robert Katzmann ruled that the artist's use of the line did not constitute copyright infringement and that Ora and Wallace were well within their rights to use it in their songs. The court further stated that "Party and Bullshit" and "How We Do (Party)" "sufficiently transformed the purpose of [the line] from something to be condemned or shunned 'to something glorified', and one embracing and enjoying the 'party and bullshit' culture".

== Track listing ==
- Digital download and streaming
1. "How We Do (Party)" – 4:06
- Digital download and streaming – Extended play (EP)
1. "How We Do (Party)" – 4:06
2. "How We Do (Party)" (Gustavo Scorpio Club Mix) – 7:33
3. "How We Do (Party)" (Papercha$er Club Remix) – 6:11
4. "How We Do (Party)" (Sandro Silva Extended Club Mix) – 5:36
5. "How We Do (Party)" (Laidback Luke Club Remix) – 5:12

== Charts ==
=== Weekly charts ===
Weekly chart performance
Chart (2012)	Peak position
Australia (ARIA)	9
Austria (Ö3 Austria Top 40)	35
Belgium (Ultratip Bubbling Under Flanders)	18
Canada Hot 100 (Billboard)	68
Canada CHR/Top 40 (Billboard)	40
Czech Republic Airplay (ČNS IFPI)	83
Denmark (Tracklisten)	40
Euro Digital Song Sales (Billboard)	1
Germany (GfK)	40
Global Dance Songs (Billboard)	12
Ireland (IRMA)	1
Japan Hot 100 (Billboard)	5
Netherlands (Dutch Top 40)	28
Netherlands (Single Top 100)	31
New Zealand (Recorded Music NZ)	5
Romania (Airplay 100)	62
Scottish Singles Sales (Official Charts)	1
Switzerland (Schweizer Hitparade)	41
UK Singles (Official Charts)	1
US Billboard Hot 100	62
US Dance Club Songs (Billboard)	1
US Pop Airplay (Billboard)	22
US Rhythmic Airplay (Billboard)	28

=== Year-end charts ===
Year-end chart performance
Chart (2012)	Position
Australia (ARIA)	84
UK Singles (OCC)	50
US Dance Club Songs (Billboard)	2

Chart (2013)	Position
Japan (Japan Hot 100)	98

== Certifications ==
Certifications and sales
Region	Certification	Certified units/sales
Australia (ARIA)	2× Platinum	140,000^{^}
New Zealand (RMNZ)	Gold	7,500^{*}
United Kingdom (BPI)	Platinum	600,000^{‡}
^{*} Sales figures based on certification alone.^{^} Shipments figures based on certification alone.^{‡} Sales+streaming figures based on certification alone.

== Release history ==
Release dates and formats for "How We Do (Party)"
Region	Date	Format(s)	Label(s)	Ref.
Various	20 March 2012	Digital download; streaming	Columbia; Roc Nation	
United States	24 April 2012	Contemporary hit radio	Columbia; Roc Nation	

== See also ==
- List of Billboard Dance Club Songs number ones of 2012
- List of number-one singles of 2012 (Ireland)
- List of songs subject to plagiarism disputes
- List of UK Singles Chart number ones of the 2010s
