= Rita Ora =

British singer-songwriter (born 1990)

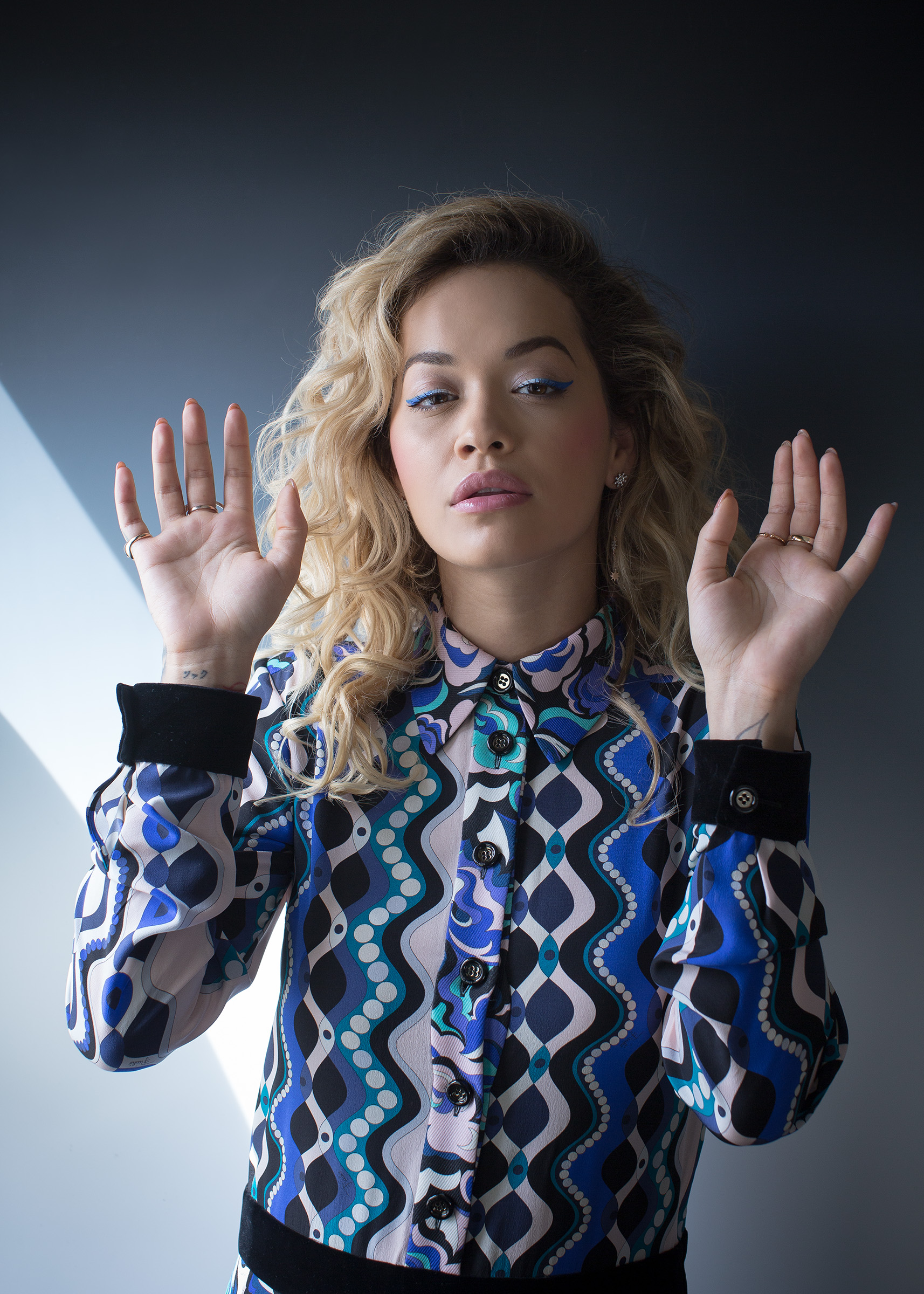
- Ora in Berlin, by Oliver Mark, 2018
- Born: Rita Sahatçiu; 26 November 1990 (age 35); Pristina, SFR Yugoslavia (now Kosovo)
- Citizenship: United Kingdom; Kosovo
- Education: Sylvia Young Theatre School
- Occupations: Singer; songwriter; television personality; actress
- Years active: 2004–present
- Works: Discography
- Spouse: Taika Waititi (m. 2022)
- Relatives: Besim Sahatçiu (grandfather)
- Musical career
- Genre: Pop
- Instruments: Vocals
- Labels: BMG; Atlantic; Roc Nation; Columbia
- Website: ritaora.com

Rita Sahatçiu Ora (Albanian: [ˈɾita sahatˈtʃiu ˈɔɾa]; née Sahatçiu; born 26 November 1990) is a British singer, songwriter, television personality, and actress. Born in Pristina, modern-day Kosovo, she rose to prominence when she featured on DJ Fresh's 2012 single "Hot Right Now", which topped the UK singles chart. In 2008, she signed with American rapper Jay-Z's label Roc Nation. Ora released her debut studio album, Ora (2012), which debuted atop the UK Albums Chart and produced the UK number-one singles "R.I.P." and "How We Do (Party)".

In 2014, Ora featured on Australian rapper Iggy Azalea's single, "Black Widow", which peaked at number three on the US Billboard Hot 100. The following year, she was named an honorary ambassador of Kosovo. After parting ways with Roc Nation, Ora signed with Atlantic Records to release her second studio album, Phoenix (2018). It produced the singles "Your Song", "Anywhere", and "Let You Love Me"; the latter made Ora the first British female solo artist to have thirteen top-ten songs in the UK. Her third studio album, You & I (2023), debuted at number six in the UK.

Ora has been a judge on television talent shows including The X Factor UK (2015), The Masked Singer UK (2020–2024), and The Masked Singer US (2024–present), as well as a coach on The Voice UK (2015) and The Voice Australia (2021–2023). She played Mia Grey in the Fifty Shades film series (2015–2018).

== Early life ==
Rita Sahatçiu was born on 26 November 1990 in Pristina, SFR Yugoslavia (modern-day Kosovo), to Albanian parents. Her mother, Vera (née Bajraktari), is a psychiatrist and her father, Besnik Sahatçiu, is a pub owner; he studied economics. Ora's mother is Catholic and her father is a nominal Muslim. Ora has an older sister, Elena, and a younger brother, Don. Her maternal grandfather, Osman Bajraktari, was the Albanian consul to Russia (then part of the Soviet Union). Ora's paternal grandfather, Besim Sahatçiu, was a film and theatre director. The surname Sahatçiu is derived from saatçi (Turkish for 'watchmaker'); her parents later added Ora (Albanian for 'time') to the family surname so it could be easily pronounced.

Her family left Kosovo for political reasons, due to the persecution of Albanians initiated with the disintegration of Yugoslavia. They moved to London in 1991, when Ora was a baby. She grew up in Notting Hill in West London and attended the Sylvia Young Theatre School.

== Career ==
=== 2004–2011: Career beginnings ===
Ora's first acting role at 13 was in an episode of the British drama series, The Brief; she later appeared in the British film, Spivs (2004). She also began performing at open mic sessions around London and, occasionally, in her father's pub. In 2008, she auditioned for Eurovision: Your Country Needs You on BBC One to be the British contestant for the Eurovision Song Contest 2009 and qualified, but later withdrew from the competition after a few episodes as she "did not feel ready" and thought "that challenge wasn't for her." Her manager, Sarah Stennett (who also worked with Ellie Goulding, Jessie J and Conor Maynard), later told HitQuarters that she reassured Ora that performing in Eurovision would hinder, rather than help her chances to make it as a solo artist.

Shortly after, Ora's management got in touch with the American label, Roc Nation, and told them about her. Ora signed a recording deal and a publishing deal with Roc Nation in December 2008, and was one of their first signees. She made a cameo appearance in Jay Z's video for "Young Forever" (2009). After being signed, Ora recorded an album and wanted to release it, but her label advised against it and she started to work on other material for her debut album.

=== 2012–2013: Musical breakthrough and Ora ===
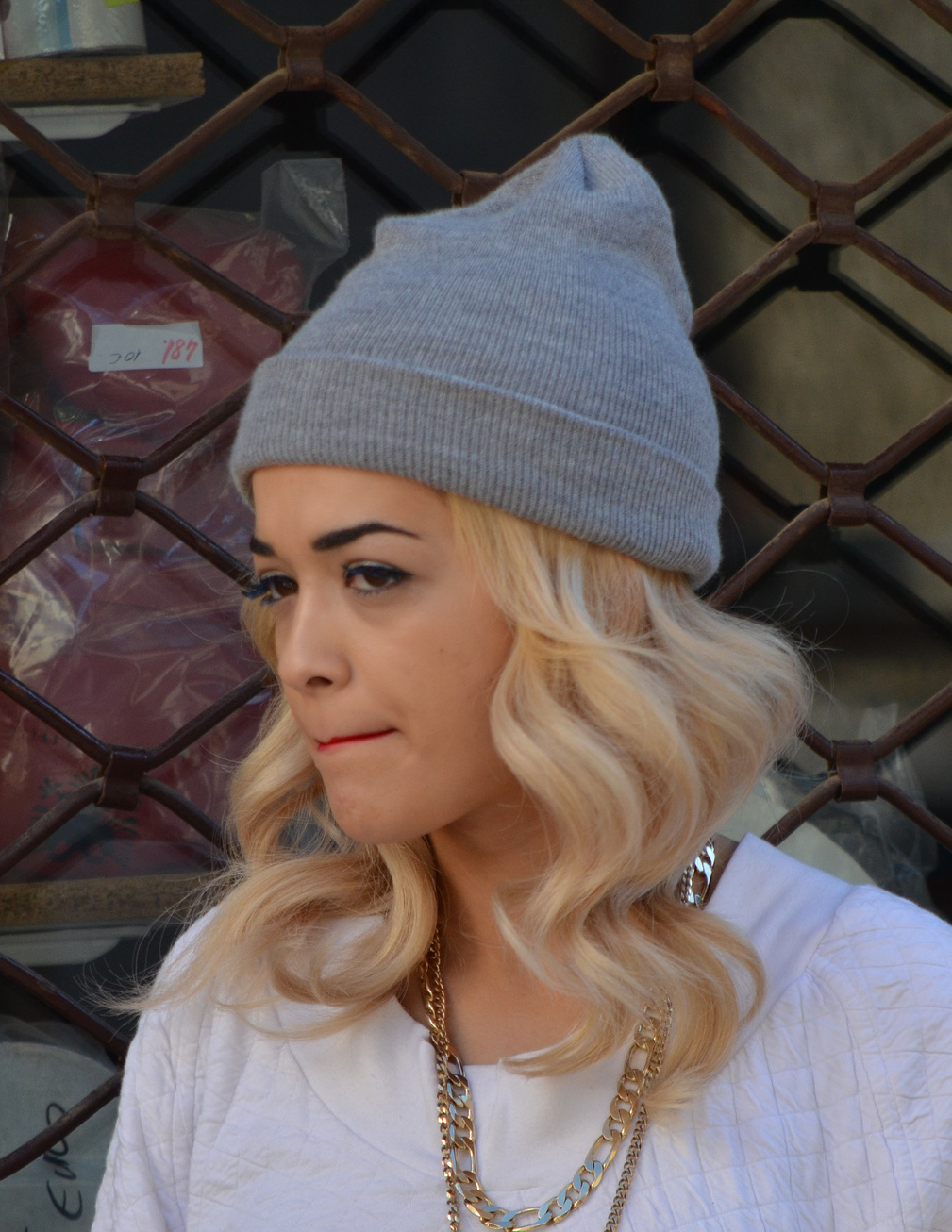
Ora in Pristina, Kosovo during the filming of "Shine Ya Light", a music video, September 2012

Throughout 2011, Ora released covers and videos about working on her debut album on YouTube. The videos caught the attention of DJ Fresh, who at that time was looking for a female vocalist for his song, "Hot Right Now". She was featured on the single that was released on 12 February 2012, debuting at number one on the UK Singles Chart. During February 2012, Ora was also the opening act at UK concerts on Drake's Club Paradise Tour. The first UK single from her debut album, "R.I.P." (featuring Tinie Tempah), was released on 6 May 2012. Produced by Chase & Status, the song debuted at the top of the UK Singles Chart, becoming her first solo UK number one. On 12 August, "How We Do (Party)" was released as a single, and it reached number one in the UK and Ireland. It was Ora's second UK number one as a solo artist, and third overall in 2012.

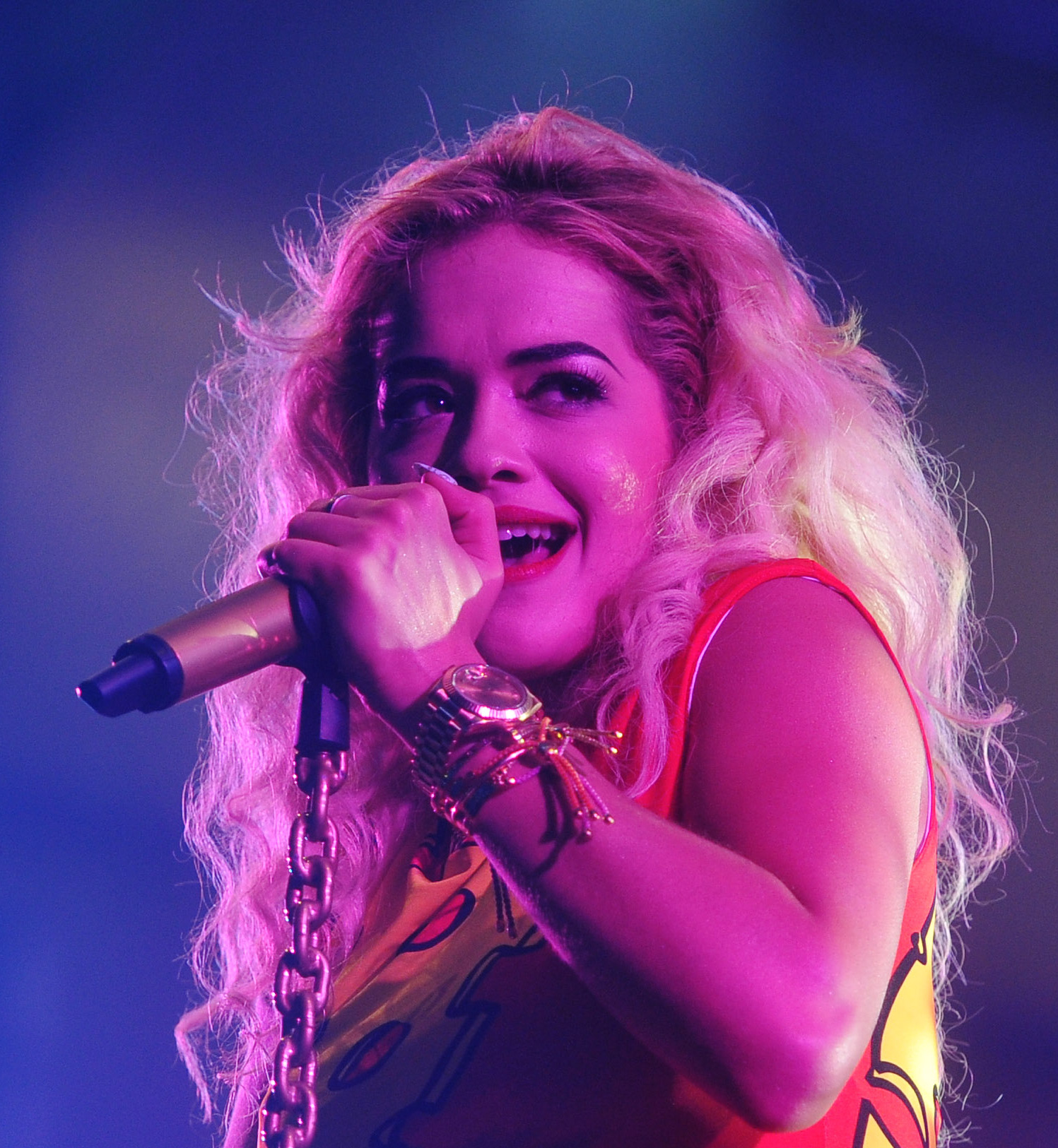
Ora at Future Music Festival Asia, September 2013

Whilst supporting Coldplay on their Mylo Xyloto Tour, she later announced that her debut album would be titled Ora. The album was released on 27 August 2012 in Europe and Oceania, and debuted at the top of the UK Albums Chart. Ora was nominated for Best New Artist, Push Artist and Best UK/Ireland Act at the 2012 MTV Europe Music Awards. In September 2012, it was announced that Ora would be the opening act on the UK concerts from Usher's Euphoria Tour set to start in January 2013. However, the tour was postponed due to Usher's "professional and personal commitments". "Shine Ya Light", released on 4 November, became Ora's fourth consecutive UK top ten single in 2012 (the only artist to do so in 2012), peaking at number ten. On 28 November 2012, Ora performed as a special guest at the concert held in Tirana, Albania, for the 100th Anniversary of the Independence of Albania.

In January 2013, Ora embarked on her first UK tour, Radioactive Tour, to support her debut album. She was nominated for three awards at the 2013 Brit Awards, including the Brit Award for British Breakthrough Act. Also in January 2013, Ora revealed that her second album would be clearer and have more direction than the first one. On 26 February 2013, she revealed to Digital Spy that her second album shows a different angle to a "party girl". On 24 May 2013, Ora was the headline act on the In New Music We Trust stage at BBC Radio 1's Big Weekend. On 28 June 2013, she performed on the Pyramid Stage at Glastonbury.

=== 2014–2016: Split from Roc Nation and films ===
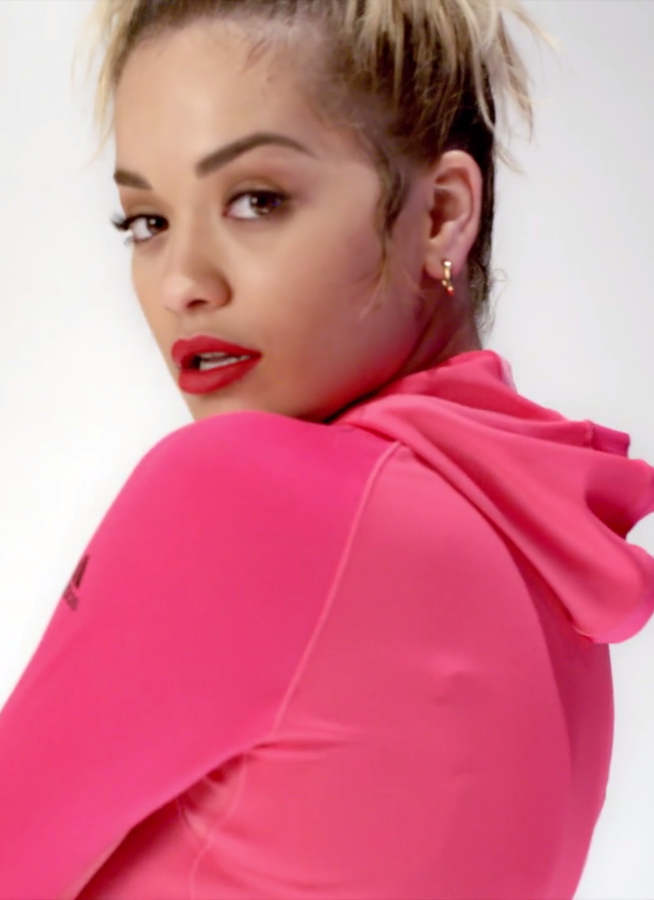
Ora in an Adidas interview in 2016

In 2014, she had two top-five UK singles; the song "I Will Never Let You Down" which debuted at number one, and she featured on Iggy Azalea's "Black Widow" which peaked at number four in the UK, and the latter became Ora's first top ten song on the US Billboard Hot 100 chart, peaking at number three. The music video for the song was directed by Director X and inspired by Quentin Tarantino's epic martial arts films Kill Bill and Kill Bill 2. Actors Michael Madsen, Paul Sorvino, and rapper T.I. also appear in the video. It remains Ora's highest debut on Billboard Top 100 and the most viewed music video of hers with over 690 million views. On 14 December 2014, Ora performed at the 2014 telecast of Christmas in Washington, filmed at the National Building Museum. In February 2015, Ora featured on Charli XCX song, "Doing It", which debuted at number eight in the UK. In April 2014, Ora appeared alongside Korean popstar, Hyuna, in an episode of Funny or Die called "Girl, You Better Walk".

In 2015, she played Christian Grey's sister, Mia, in the film adaptation of the best-selling novel Fifty Shades of Grey, a role she later reprised in the film's two sequels. Ora originally approached the production hoping to contribute to the film's soundtrack and instead was asked to audition for the role of Mia Grey by the director of the film, Sam Taylor-Johnson. On 22 February 2015, at the 87th Academy Awards, she performed the song "Grateful", which appears in Gina Prince-Bythewood's film, Beyond the Lights (2014). In December 2015, Ora filed a lawsuit against Roc Nation, seeking release from the label and citing that the contract she signed in 2008 is "unenforceable", due to California's "seven-year rule". The complaint stated that she's "only been permitted to release one album despite creating multiple additional records for release" and that her relationship with Roc Nation is "irrevocably damaged". In 2015, she was a coach on the fourth series of The Voice UK on BBC One, replacing Kylie Minogue. The same year, it was confirmed that Ora and BBC Radio 1 presenter, Nick Grimshaw, signed as judges for the twelfth series of The X Factor on the rival TV network, ITV, after a bidding war between The X Factor and The Voice UK. She hosted the BBC Radio 1's Teen Awards, alongside Grimshaw, five times (from 2013 to 2017).

In January 2016, Roc Nation filed a counter-lawsuit against Ora for breaking her recording contract, in New York. They reached a settlement in May 2016. In June 2016, it was reported that she signed a new record deal with Atlantic Records. In July 2016, Tyra Banks, the creator of America's Next Top Model, announced that Ora would replace her as host of the revamped show which aired on VH1. On 3 September 2016, she performed in a concert at the Basilica of St. Paul Outside the Walls, in Rome, at the vigil for Mother Teresa's canonisation, alongside other Albanian artists, accompanied by the Kosovo Philharmonic Orchestra.

=== 2017–2019: Phoenix ===
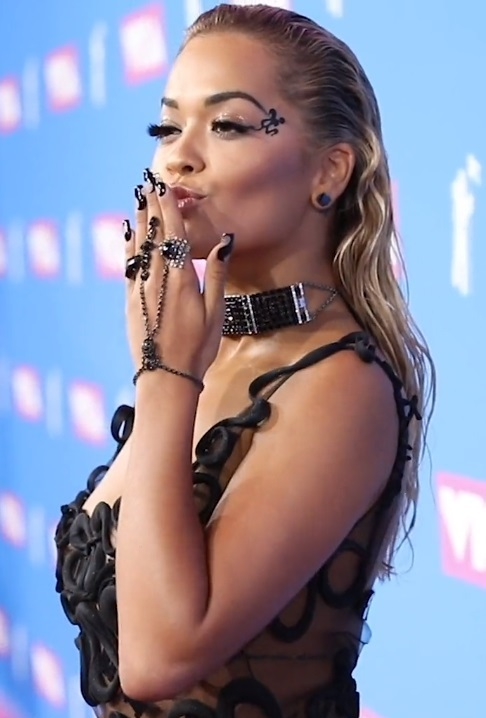
Ora in 2018 at the VMA Red Carpet

On 26 May 2017, Ora released her first solo single in almost two years, titled "Your Song", which peaked at number seven in the UK. The song served as the lead single from Ora's second studio album, after previous attempts at her second record were lost in her lawsuit against her former label, Roc Nation. The second single, "Anywhere", became her eleventh top ten song in the UK, peaking at number two. Ora hosted the 2017 MTV Europe Music Awards on 12 November in London, at Wembley Arena.

In January 2018, Ora released the song "For You" (with Liam Payne), from the soundtrack of the film Fifty Shades Freed. On 18 September 2018, Ora revealed the title of her second studio album, Phoenix, and its release date, 23 November. On 21 September, she released the album's fourth single, "Let You Love Me". The song reached number four in the UK, marking Ora's 13th top-ten song, thus breaking a 30-year-old record for most top ten songs by a British female solo artist (previously jointly held by Shirley Bassey and Petula Clark).

From 1 March to April 2019, she went on the Phoenix World Tour in Europe, Asia and Oceania. In April 2019, Ora released the song "Carry On" with Norwegian producer Kygo, as a standalone single for Pokémon: Detective Pikachu, a film in which she also briefly appears. On 31 May, she released the song "Ritual", with Tiësto and Jonas Blue. In September 2019, Ora confirmed to Marie Claire that she had begun working on her third studio album. She provided further details regarding the music with NME, stating that "people have been coming to studio sessions from all over the world. I've been working on this now for the past two years, on and off. I have plans for this third album to be something I've never done before."

=== 2020–present: You & I ===
From January 2020, Ora was a judge on the UK version of the music game show The Masked Singer. From 2021 to 2023, she was a coach on The Voice Australia to replace Delta Goodrem. In the January 2021 film Twist, an adaptation of Charles Dickens' Oliver Twist, Ora played the Artful Dodger. On 12 February 2021, Ora released the collaborative extended play, Bang, with Kazakh producer Imanbek. In February 2022, Ora signed a record deal with Berlin-based music label, BMG Rights Management (BMG).

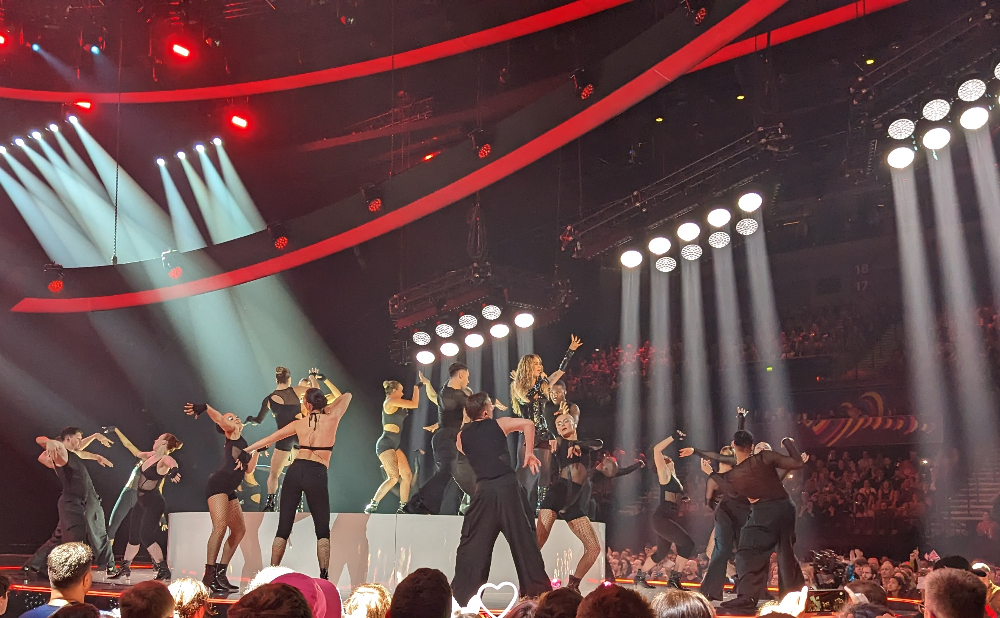
Ora performing on Eurovision 2023

Ora hosted the 2022 MTV Europe Music Awards, with Taika Waititi, on 13 November in Düsseldorf, Germany. In February 2022, she was announced to act in the Disney+ prequel–an eight-episode limited series–to the 2017 film, Beauty and The Beast, in a role described as a "fugitive with surprising abilities who carries with her a secret that could potentially affect an entire kingdom", but the project got put on hold indefinitely.

On 27 January 2023, she released the song, "You Only Love Me", as the lead single from her third studio album,You & I. On 19 April 2023, she released the song, "Praising You", in collaboration with Fatboy Slim, and announced that the album would be released on 14 July. You & I debuted at number six in the United Kingdom. In September 2023, Fox announced that Ora would join the American version of The Masked Singer as a judge.

In 2024, Ora starred on the Disney+ musical film Descendants: The Rise of Red, in which she played the Queen of Hearts—based on the character from Alice in Wonderland—and performed the song "Love Ain't It" with co-stars Kylie Cantrall, Brandy and Malia Baker. She reprised the role in the 2026 sequel Descendants: Wicked Wonderland, in which she performed the songs "Mad", with Leonardo Nam; and "The Girl I Used to Be", with Brandy.

On 11 October 2024, Australian singer Kylie Minogue announced Ora would be the supporting act to her U.S leg of the Tension Tour alongside Romy Madley Croft.

== Other activities ==
=== Design ===
In January 2014, Adidas announced a multi-year designer collaboration with Ora for their brand of casual sports clothing, Adidas Originals. Ora designed her own apparel collections for the brand, including footwear and accessories. In 2016, she collaborated with Italian fashion brand, Tezenis, on a capsule lingerie collection. In 2018, Ora co-designed a shoe collection with the Italian footwear designer, Giuseppe Zanotti. After appearing as the face of Escada, Ora co-designed a capsule collection with the brand in 2019. In September 2023, the Dublin-based retailer, Primark, announced a multi-season fashion collaboration with Ora. The first collection, co-designed by Ora, consisted of 169 pieces across knitwear, denim, tailoring and outerwear, along with shoes and accessories.

=== Endorsements ===
In 2010, Ora featured in a commercial for Skullcandy headphones. In 2011, she appeared in Calvin Klein's CK One campaign. In 2013, she was the face of Italian sneaker brand, Superga, and the face of Material Girl, a clothing line designed by Madonna. In September 2013, cosmetics brand, Rimmel, announced their collaboration with Ora for makeup collections. She was the face of two Donna Karan 2014 collections, Resort collection, and Autumn/Winter collection. She was also the face of the label's fragrance, DKNY My NY, inspired by New York City. In March 2014, Ora was one of the cast members of Marks & Spencer's "Leading Ladies" campaign. Later in 2014, she appeared as the face of Roberto Cavalli Autumn/Winter campaign. In 2015, she appeared in Coca-Cola and Samsung Galaxy S6 advertising campaigns. In 2019, she was the face of several German brands; luxury fashion label, Escada, jewellery company, Thomas Sabo, and footwear retailer, Deichmann. Ora appeared in "London After Hours" campaign for Pepe Jeans in 2023.

=== Philanthropy ===
On 23 March 2013, Ora performed at Bal de la Rose du Rocher in Monte Carlo in aid of the Princess Grace Foundation. On 1 June 2013, Ora performed at the "Chime for Change" charity concert at Twickenham Stadium in London, which raised funds and awareness for girls' and women's issues around the world. On 15 November 2014, Ora joined the charity group Band Aid 30 to record a version of the track, "Do They Know It's Christmas?", to raise money for the 2014 Ebola crisis in West Africa. On 9 March 2016, she gave a speech on immigration and the Syrian refugee crisis at the We Day UK event in London, organised by Free the Children. In April 2019, she became one of UNICEF UK's ambassadors.

== Personal life ==
Ora considers herself spiritual but not religious. She speaks Albanian. She has nine tattoos, including a dove on her neck, a bow and arrow behind her ear, her sister’s name, and her best friend’s birthday, featuring personal tributes in Hindi and Hebrew. Ora is a fan of English football club Manchester City.

On 10 July 2015, Ora was named an Honorary Ambassador of Kosovo by then-president Atifete Jahjaga at the Embassy of Kosovo in London. Ora, who was joined at the ceremony by her parents, and former British Prime Minister and his wife, Tony and Cherie Blair, said that she was "overwhelmed" by the honour.

Ora dated Scottish DJ Calvin Harris from 2013 until June 2014. In 2016, Ora and American musician Andrew Watt started dating. They were together for two years until September 2018; they got back together in January 2019, but broke up again in October 2019. Since 2021, she has been in a relationship with New Zealand filmmaker Taika Waititi. They married in August 2022 and live in Los Angeles.

In November 2020, Ora broke the COVID-19 restrictions by having her birthday party at a West London restaurant during a period of national lockdown. Ora had recently returned from Egypt and was supposed to be isolating for 14 days, upon her return to London, as a result. According to the police, her security offered to pay the venue £5,000 to break guidelines and asked for CCTV cameras to be switched off. The restaurant's representative denied that such payment was made. Ora apologised for the breach and was fined £10,000.

== Discography ==
- Ora (2012)
- Phoenix (2018)
- You & I (2023)

== Tours ==
Headlining

- Ora Tour (2012)
- Radioactive Tour (2013)
- The Girls Tour (2018)
- Phoenix World Tour (2019)

Supporting

- DJ Fresh – DJ Fresh Tour (2012)
- Drake – Club Paradise Tour (2012)
- Coldplay – Mylo Xyloto Tour (2012)
- Kylie Minogue – Tension Tour (2025)

== Filmography ==
=== Film ===
Year	Title	Role	Notes
2004	Harry Potter and the Prisoner of Azkaban	Extra	Uncredited
2004	Spivs	Rosanna	
2013	Fast & Furious 6	Race Caller	Uncredited
2015	Fifty Shades of Grey	Mia Grey	
2015	Southpaw	Maria Escobar	
2017	Fifty Shades Darker	Mia Grey	
2018	Fifty Shades Freed	Mia Grey	
2019	Pokémon Detective Pikachu	Dr. Ann Laurent	
2021	Twist	Dodger	
2023	Wonderwell	Yana	
2024	Descendants: The Rise of Red	Queen of Hearts	
2025	Tin Soldier	Mama Suki	
2026	He Bled Neon	TBA	
2026	Descendants: Wicked Wonderland	Queen of Hearts	
2027	Voltron	Witch Haggar	Post-production
2027	Honeymoon with Harry	TBA	Filming

=== Television ===
Year	Title	Role	Notes
2004	The Brief	Jaclyn Livermore	Episode: "Children"; Credited as Rita Sahatçiu Ora
2006	Bombshell	Leylah	Episode: "Episode 2"
2015	The Voice UK	Coach	Series 4
2015	Empire	Herself	Episode: "Who I Am"
2015	The X Factor	Judge	Series 12
2016–2017	America's Next Top Model	Host	Cycle 23
2017	Boy Band	Host	
2017, 2022, 2024	MTV Europe Music Awards	Host	
2019	RuPaul's Drag Race All Stars	Guest Judge	Season 4
2020–2024	The Masked Singer (UK)	Panelist	Series 1–present
2021–2023	The Voice Australia	Coach	Series 10–12
2022–2023	Kung Fu Panda: The Dragon Knight	Luthera / Wandering Blade (voice)	Season 1–3
2024–present	The Masked Singer (US)	Panelist	Season 11–present
2025	Too Much	Herself	2 episodes
2025	It's Florida, Man	Doctor Jasonville	Episode: "Crushed"

== See also ==
- List of UK singles chart number ones of the 2010s
- List of UK Albums Chart number ones of the 2010s
- List of people from the Royal Borough of Kensington and Chelsea
- List of people from Pristina
- Albanian diaspora
