= FLCL: Shoegaze =

- Season 5
- Key visual for FLCL: Shoegaze
- No. of episodes: 3

Release
- Original network: Adult Swim
- Original release: October 1 – October 15, 2023

Season chronology
- ← Previous; Season 4: Grunge

The fifth season of the FLCL anime series, titled FLCL: Shoegaze, is produced by Production I.G and Adult Swim's production arm Williams Street. Shoegaze was animated by NUT, with direction by Yutaka Uemura and screenplay by Kenta Ihara. It premiered on October 1, 2023, in the United States on Adult Swim's Toonami programming block. In addition to contributing to the soundtrack of the season, the Pillows performed the ending theme song "About A Rock'n'Roll Band". Shoegaze takes place 10 years after the events of FLCL Alternative and before the remaining seasons. Shoegaze is the only season of FLCL to not feature the series main protagonist, Haruko Haruhara.

== Episodes ==
No. overall	No. in season	Title	Directed by	Written by	Storyboarded by	Original release date
22	1	"Furu-Bari (Full Barricade)" (Japanese: フルバリ)	Yutaka Uemura	Kenta Ihara	Naoto Uchida	October 1, 2023
A 15-year-old boy named Masaki has felt like a loner throughout his childhood. Ever since smoke arose from a giant clothes-iron shaped building on the outskirts of town, Masaki started to see glowing, green ghosts everywhere he went, in addition to a strange giant purple bird-like ghost on top of Tsuganei Tower. However, no one else can see them and he becomes estranged from his peers due to their distrust of him. After transferring into high school, he meets an eccentric girl named Harumi who gets entertained by his sketches of the ghosts. Some time later, Masaki gets sick of his situation and decides to make a bomb with supplies from the school's chemistry lab. Although Harumi catches him in the act, she decides to help him with making it and they go to a local hardware store to continue gathering bomb supplies. In the present day, the two of them trespass into the tower with plans of detonating the bomb at the top floor, with Masaki hoping to find the truth behind the giant bird that only he can see. The two tower intruders get the attention of not only the police, but also Bureau of Interstellar Immigration chief Kanda and Kana Koumoto (who now works for Bureau as Kanda's second in command). When Masaki and Harumi reach the top of the tower, they find a completely empty room, making their efforts seemingly pointless. Harumi decides to prepare to light the fuse for the bomb anyways, but Masaki gets upset with her, setting off an N.O. reaction inside his head that lights the fuse by itself. Afraid they might be killed by the explosion, Masaki throws the bomb out the tower's windows and it ends up blowing apart much of the floor's windows and roof, revealing a portal into imaginary space.
23	2	"Gene-Bato (Generational Battle)" (Japanese: ジェネバト)	Yutaka Uemura	Kenta Ihara	Fumie Muroi	October 8, 2023
Harumi demands Kana buy her multiple types of candy, threatening to blow up another part of the tower in 15 minutes if her demands are not met. As Kana drives around town to buy candy, she flashes back to her post-graduate life: being afraid to meet up with Pets and her other friends again despite their time together as teenagers, being recruited by Kanda to join the Bureau, and serving as their test subject for user of her N.O. channel, however the results were found to be underwhelming by Kanda and the Bureau. Meanwhile, Kanda tries to sow mistrust inside Masaki by texting to him that Harumi is a Medical Mechanica sympathizer simply using him as a tool for her own goals. Masaki has further doubts when he tries to get Harumi to open up about herself and her motivations in helping him, but she continues to play coy. As the two walk up the stairwell and touch the portal, they transform the top of the tower into a giant brain-like structure, but are unsure of what to do with it once they arrive at the control center. Kanda orders a police sniper on the helicopter flying to the top of the tower to take aim and fire at Harumi, hoping to use Masaki's shock and despair to spark an even greater N.O. reaction than before, though the sniper is reluctant to pull the trigger. Also on the helicopter is Kana who has returned with a bag of candy, and she throws it all out while arguing with Harumi about the prospect of growing up. As the brain structure reacts to Masaki's N.O. channel, the green ghosts he had been seeing suddenly become visible to everyone in town, including the sniper aiming at Harumi. Startled by the ghost, he fires a bullet meant for the ghost and it passes through and instead hits Harumi.
24	3	"Far-Fre (Far Friend)" (Japanese: ファーフレ)	Yutaka Uemura	Kenta Ihara	Taku Kimura	October 15, 2023
Kana jumps from the helicopter onto the top of the tower and tries desperately to stop Harumi from bleeding to death as the various ghosts become visible across town. Harumi becomes a purple ghost and hovers above her lifeless body before being absorbed by the bird ghost atop the tower, seeing past visions of herself as a boy riding on a space shuttle with a long-lost friend and arriving on a colony on Mars. At the same time this is happening, 17-year-old Kana had activated her N.O. to stop Medical Mechanica's irons from destroying Earth and as an indirect result Mars and the colony become displaced in an alternate universe. It is revealed that Harumi had become displaced as a result of the universal N.O. split and is now in the body of a girl back on Earth. Ghost Harumi regains consciousness back inside her body on Earth and Masaki loses control of his N.O. channel as the world begins to merge back into one, however the power of his N.O. threatens to grow out of control. After confessing his feelings to Harumi and kissing her, a giant flying snake-like creature bursts out of his forehead and swallows the power source of the tower, forcing an emergency shutdown and cancellation of the remerging of both universes. Masaki asks about the whereabouts of Harumi, only to discover she has vanished and that everyone in the world seem to have forgotten about her existence. In the end, Masaki can still see the ghosts everywhere, as they have once again become invisible to everyone but him. Kana and Kanda converse during a baseball catching session about the failure of the Bureau's 10 year project to remerge the universes once again, with Kanda expressing disappointment about not being able to ever see Haruko again, who was sent to the other universe during the split. Kana reassures him that the memories of the people they held close to them in the past are what really matter. Some time later, Masaki finds himself able to cross over into the alternate universe where the original Harumi exists as a boy on Mars and shows them his sketchbook as proof of their history together. Harumi asks how he was able to cross over into their universe and Masaki reveals that it was thanks to a miniature version of the snake from before, a being named Atomsk.
