= FLCL: Grunge =

- Season 4
- Key visual for FLCL: Grunge
- No. of episodes: 3

Release
- Original network: Adult Swim
- Original release: September 10 – September 24, 2023

Season chronology
- ← Previous; Season 3: Alternative Next → Season 5: Shoegaze

The fourth season of the FLCL anime series, titled FLCL: Grunge, is produced by Production I.G and Adult Swim's production arm Williams Street. Grunge was animated by MontBlanc Pictures, with direction by Hitoshi Takekiyo and screenplay by Tetsuhiro Ikeda. It aired from September 10 to September 24, 2023, in the United States on Adult Swim's Toonami programming block. In addition to contributing towards the soundtrack of the season, the Pillows performed the ending theme song "Vivid Venus". Grunge is a prequel to the original FLCL series from 2000.

== Episodes ==
No. overall	No. in season	Title	Directed by	Written by	Storyboarded by	Original release date
19	1	"Shinpachi" (Japanese: シンパチ)	Hitoshi Takekiyo	Tetsuhiro Ideka	Hitoshi Takekiyo	September 10, 2023
Shinpachi, also known by his nickname Shin, is a boy working at his father's sushi restaurant in the town of Okura. Before the local high school closed, the final class was down to only three students: himself, Shonari, and Orinoko. This is a direct result of the town's dwindling population thanks to the local Medical Mechanica plant that's gradually destroying the atmosphere, with wealthy citizens leaving the planet in interstellar rocket shuttles. Shin and his father are visited one night by the local mayor and his mistress Haruko, who awakens Shin's N.O. portal after kissing him behind the restaurant. Just before this occurred, Shin had received a kitchen knife made by Orinoko and her father, the only local blacksmith remaining. The next evening, the mayor and Haruko return to the restaurant to meet up with a high-ranking robot official from Medical Mechanica to discuss the arrival of Extragalactic Bureau of Investigation (EBI) agent Amarao on the planet. During this conversation, Haruko slips a thumb drive disguised as sushi into the robot, infecting it with a computer virus that forces it to execute a countdown activation of the plant. As the robot blasts off back towards the plant, Haruko swipes the mayor's interstellar shuttle tickets and gives all but one to her co-workers back at the escort agency she was working under. After the mayor confronts Haruko outside the agency, a large brawl breaks out between his police force and yakuza associates against another non-affiliated yakuza clan. Shin arrives to try to save Haruko but is quickly captured by the mayor's henchmen and is about to be executed when Shonari appears with a katana to rescue him, killing the mayor in the process. At the same time these events are occurring, Haruko escapes the scene on her Vespa. The two boys clear a path around the chaos that Shonari has created as they follow Haruko onto the highway towards the Medical Mechanica plant.
20	2	"Shonari" (Japanese: ショウナリ)	Hitoshi Takekiyo	Tetsuhiro Ideka	Hitoshi Takekiyo	September 17, 2023
Shonari is a rockian, an alien literally composed of strong rocks. His parents died five years ago when he was 10 years old and ever since he was looked after by his older brother Dainari, who accepted a job in a yakuza clan as their enforcer and cleaner. Facing intense stress from the work, Dainari becomes an extreme alcoholic and receives brain damage from all the drinking. After the clan's boss is assassinated by a rival yakuza group, Haruko takes over mostly as result of being his mistress. While driving home, Shonari and Dainari pick up Orinoko off the side of the road, who expresses frustration as she could not find iron ore to be used for forging. Shonari hands her a magnetic speaker to improve her search, and he later receives a katana made by Orinoko and her father that's composed of meteoric ore she found with the magnet. She tells Shonari to use it to protect the ones he love. Meanwhile, Haruko's plan commences as a mob war erupts between the two yakuza clans. During the battle, Shonari witnesses the death of Dainari and another rockian working for the rival clan from live dynamite planted into his brother's body. Haruko tells Shonari that his brother's killer was under the mayor's payroll, as means of distracting the general public from Medical Mechanica. Accidentally slicing up Amarao's eyebrows while en-route towards the battle, Shonari uses his blade to execute the mayor and save Shin. But he becomes confused upon discovering Haruko was also pretending to be the mayor's mistress as both of them follow her to the plant.
21	3	"Orinoko" (Japanese: オリノコ)	Hitoshi Takekiyo	Tetsuhiro Ideka	Hitoshi Takekiyo	September 24, 2023
Orinoko works at her father's blacksmith forge, along with an assistant robot who he treats as her late mother. After digging through a junk-filled crater to find usable metal, she meets Haruko who is attempting to repair her Vespa. Orinoko helps her out by giving her parts she found and in exchange Haruko later finds and gives her a whetstone for blade sharpening. Some time later, Orinoko manages to craft an ugly but solid knife for Shinpachi, who gives her 5,000 yen in payment. After receiving the magnet from Shonari, Orinoko finds enough meteoric ore to forge an actual sword. She, her father, and the robot all work hard to finish it, but her dad perishes shortly after completing the blade. Orinoko hands the katana over to Shonari as a gift for helping her just as the mob war erupts in Okura. She returns home just as the Medical Mechanica plant begins making its move towards the forge. The assistant robot begins to shut down and Orinoko learns it actually houses her mother's memories. Orinoko takes a backup disc from the robot and escapes before the forge collapses due to the plant's arrival. As Orinoko meets up with Shin and Shonari, Haruko makes use of Shin's N.O. portal and Shonari's katana to pull out a Rickenbacker 4001 guitar to take out Medical Mechanica's giant robot. Haruko gives the last of the tickets she stole from the mayor to the trio as thanks. When the plant arrives at the junk-filled crater, it awakens the dormant Atomsk inside and he leaves the planet, destroying much of what remained of the planet's atmosphere. Haruko attempts to chase after him on her Vespa, running over Amarao as he attempts to stop her in an alley. Haruko ends up on the top of the Medical Mechanica plant as it defies the planet's weak gravity and travels into outer space. Shin and Shonari decide to stay behind and allow Orinoko to use the ticket on the last interstellar rocket shuttle off the planet.
