= List of Mashle episodes =

Key visual for the series

Mashle: Magic and Muscles is an anime television series based on Hajime Kōmoto's manga series of the same name. The anime series adaptation was announced in July 2022. It is produced by A-1 Pictures and directed by Tomoya Tanaka, with scripts written by Yōsuke Kuroda, character designs by Hisashi Toshima, and music composed by Masaru Yokoyama. The first season aired from April 8 to July 1, 2023, on Tokyo MX and other networks. (Note: Tokyo MX listed the season's timeslot as Friday at 24:00 JST, which is effectively Saturday at midnight.) For this season, the opening theme song is "Knock Out" performed by Taiiku Okazaki, while the ending theme song is "Cream Puff Funk" (シュークリーム・ファンク, "Shūkurīmu Fanku") performed by The Dance for Philosophy. According to the official website for the series, it will be a "complete" anime adaptation.

A second season was announced after the airing of the twelfth episode. Titled Mashle: Magic and Muscles – The Divine Visionary Candidate Exam Arc (マッシュル-MASHLE- 神覚者候補選抜試験編, Masshuru: Shinkakusha Kōho Senbatsu Shiken-hen), it was broadcast from January 6 to March 30, 2024. For this season, the opening theme song is "Bling-Bang-Bang-Born" performed by Creepy Nuts, while the ending theme song is "Tokyo's Way!" (トーキョーズ・ウェイ！, "Tōkyōzu Wei!") performed by Shiritsu Ebisu Chugaku.

In May 2024, a sequel to the television series was announced. It was later confirmed to be a third season, adapting the "Tri-Magicathalon Divine Visionary Final Exam" arc. The season is set to premiere on January 10, 2027. (Note: Tokyo MX listed the season's timeslot as Saturday at 24:00 JST, which is effectively Sunday at midnight)

Aniplex of America revealed an English version of the announcement video at their Anime Expo panel on July 3, 2022. On February 21, 2023, Crunchyroll announced that they would stream the series; an English dub premiered on May 26 of the same year. Medialink licensed the series in Asia-Pacific and streamed it on Amazon Prime Video. In October 2024 at its New York Comic Con panel, Aniplex of America announced that the English dub would broadcast on Adult Swim's Toonami programming block beginning on November 10 of the same year. The second season premiered on the same block on November 9, 2025. In October 2026, Anime Limited announced that it would release the first season of the series in a Collector's Edition Blu-ray set in the United Kingdom in 2027.

== Series overview ==
Season	Episodes	Originally released	
Season	Episodes	First released	Last released
1	12	April 8, 2023	July 1, 2023
2	12	January 6, 2024	March 30, 2024
3	TBA	January 10, 2027	TBA

== Episodes ==
=== Season 1 (2023) ===
No. overall	No. in season	Title	Directed by	Chief animation directed by	Original release date	English air date
1	1	"Mash Burnedead and the Body of the Gods"; Transliteration: "Masshu Bāndeddo to Kitae Nukareta Kinniku" (Japanese: マッシュ・バーンデッドと鍛えぬかれた筋肉)	Directed by : Aika Ikeda; Storyboarded by : Tomoya Tanaka	Hisashi Higashijima	April 8, 2023	November 10, 2024
In the Magic Realm all humans can use magic, possessing black marks on their faces as proof of God's gift. Regro Burnedead lives in a forest with his airheaded, magic-less teenage son Mash. Regro raises Mash in isolation because Mash would be hated if people knew, so instead he trained Mash's physical abilities, giving him superhuman strength and athleticism. Against Regro's instructions, Mash visits the city to buy cream puffs, causing many to notice he is Unmarked. Due to his unfamiliarity with people, Mash insults police-officers Terry and his boss Brad, who try to arrest Mash since the Unmarked are hated by God and should be executed as threats to magical society. Regro, who found Mash abandoned as a baby, refuses to give him up. Mash defeats Brad, using his ridiculous strength to simply slap away spells cast at him. Brad offers Mash a deal; enter magic academy and graduate as the top ranked student, earning the title Divine Visionary, to prove God accepts him, or Brad will report Mash to the government who will hunt them their entire lives. To keep Regro safe, Mash agrees to attend the academy.
2	2	"Mash Burnedead and the Mysterious Maze"; Transliteration: "Masshu Bāndeddo to Fushigina Meiro" (Japanese: マッシュ・バーンデッドと不思議な迷路)	Masakazu Obara	Tomomi Ishikawa	April 15, 2023	November 17, 2024
Brad provides Mash a fake Mark so he can attend Easton Academy's entrance exam. Examiner Claude dislikes Mash, mistaking his airheadedness for laziness. Mash passes the magical demonstrations, confusing Claude that Mash can somehow lift boulders and run on water without using spells. For the last test the applicants must escape a trap filled maze. Mash encounters Lemon, a shy girl who sabotages Mash on purpose. Lemon is confronted by a monster but Mash saves her, reassures her, then escapes the maze by simply smashing through the walls. Lemon, having mistaken Mash's reassurance and kindness as a marriage proposal, reveals Claude took advantage of her poverty to force her to sabotage Mash. Claude is disciplined by Headmaster Wahlberg who gives Mash a test of resolve; falsely suggesting Regro would die if he failed. Mash allows himself to be injured to save Regro, passing the exam. Mash meets his roommate Finn, who is wary of someone as odd as Mash, but does helpfully explain that to become a Divine Visionary Mash must collect the most reward coins among their year group by consistently scoring the highest on exams, research projects, club activities and even popularity with classmates.
3	3	"Mash Burnedead and the Baleful Bully"; Transliteration: "Masshu Bāndeddo to Okorase Chaikenai Hito" (Japanese: マッシュ・バーンデッドと怒らせちゃいけない人)	Tsuyoshi Tobita	Saki Hisamatsu	April 22, 2023	November 24, 2024
Mash draws attention from Lloyd, a bully who openly tortures his classmates due to his father's position in the Bureau of Magic, and his friendship with Easton's vice-principal Farman. Mash's belongings are secretly vandalised while Lloyd continues bullying him, though Mash does not get upset, angering Lloyd further. Finn, forced to vandalise Mash's belongings by Lloyd, refuses to vandalise anything else, so Lloyd beats him. Mash protects Finn by slamming Lloyd's head into the floor and is expelled by Farman. Reasoning it cannot get worse Mash buries Farman in a hole, pointing out he can turn up any time and bury him again as often as he wants and no magic can stop him. The Bureau of Magic insist on Mash's expulsion but he is protected by Wahlberg who is increasingly tired of people like Lloyd corrupting the government and society. Instead he offers Mash his full support in legitimately gaining the title of Divine Visionary. Mash's defeat of Lloyd makes him popular so overbearing student Tom insists he join the Duelo team, a popular sport played on flying broomsticks that rewards coins for winning matches. Mash is unsure what to do since he cannot use magic to fly.
4	4	"Mash Burnedead and the Challenging Magic User"; Transliteration: "Masshu Bāndeddo to Tsuyome no Mahōtsukai" (Japanese: マッシュ・バーンデッドと強めの魔法使い)	Atsushi Usui	Hisashi Higashijima	April 29, 2023	December 1, 2024
Tom is fouled by the opposing captain. Angered, Mash fakes flight by kicking the air so fast his legs act like helicopter blades, along with the bizarre ability to throw such a powerful curve ball it returns to Mash like a boomerang, allowing him to score a record breaking 999 points. Mash is rewarded with a silver coin and quits the team. Classmate Lance Crown traps Finn, Tom and Lemon in a small bottle to force Mash to duel him, wagering silver coins on the victor. Lance possesses two Marks signifying his superior magical strength. Mash is crushed by Lance's gravity magic but smashes the ground beneath their feet, causing Lance to stumble and drop a picture of his sister Anna. Lance believes Mash is foolish for prioritizing friends over coins. Flashbacks show Anna has a disease eating her magic; once it is gone the Bureau will execute her as an Unmarked, so Lance's goal is to become divine visionary and protect her, even if he has to take other people's coins. Mash steals the bottle with super speed, causing Lance to realize Mash values friends like he values Anna. Lance admits defeat and rewards Mash a silver coin. Mash is unsure if he could have beaten Lance in a real fight.
5	5	"Mash Burnedead and the Unpopular Classmate"; Transliteration: "Masshu Bāndeddo to Motenai Dōkyūsei" (Japanese: マッシュ・バーンデッドとモテない同級生)	Yuki Watanabe	Saki Hisamatsu	May 6, 2023	December 8, 2024
The academy splits students into three dormitories based on personality; Adler for bravery, Orca for intelligence, Lang for ambition. Mash, Finn and Lance are all Adler. Lance finds Mash and Finn have not done their Potions homework and, unwilling to let them embarrass Adler, decides to help. First they pacify screaming mandrake plants with sleep magic, except Mash who slaps his unconscious. Somehow Mash's potions always produce cream puffs. Lang dormitory decide to steal Adler members coins during off-campus forest class. Dot, a powerful but idiotic Adler student, is jealous when Lemon ignores him for Mash. Students are asked to exterminate forest scorpions for coins. A Lang student named Silva tries to provoke Mash. Dot saves a girl named Lauren from a boy attacking her, but she turns out to be a manipulative student who can enchant any man into her slave if he is even slightly attracted to her. She is furious when Mash is immune due to his total disinterest in her. She nonetheless sends Dot to fight Silva. Lance, who has gotten stuck with the useless Finn and Lemon, wonders how Mash is doing. Silva badly beats Dot, gloating about his victory, only to accidentally make Mash drop his precious creampuff.
6	6	"Mash Burnedead and the Magic of Iron"; Transliteration: "Masshu Bāndeddo to Tetsu no Mahō" (Japanese: マッシュ・バーンデッドと鉄の魔法)	Aika Ikeda	Saki Hisamatsu	May 13, 2023	December 15, 2024
Silva wagers that if Dot survives ten hits from his Iron Magic he will leave Lauren alone. Dot somehow withstands all ten but Lauren reveals she was Silva's partner all along. Mash steps in to take on the ten hit challenge and avenge his ruined cream puff. Silva obliges but Mash crushes his iron into powder and delivers two devastating punches to Silva, then calmly informs Silva under the ten hits rule he will punch him a further eight times. Silva panics until a forest scorpion appears he hopes will kill Mash, but he simply swats it away. Silva surrenders so Lauren attempts a final seduction, but Mash gives her a bridging German suplex into the floor. Dot grudgingly thanks Mash then resumes their one-sided rivalry. Lance tells Mash about Lang's secret leaders, Magia Lupus, seven noble students obsessed with stealing coins to prevent commoners getting government jobs or becoming Divine Visionaries. With a coin from Silva and two from the scorpion Mash's five silvers merge into one gold, so Lance advises him to avoid Lang. Abel, leader of Magia Lupus, punishes Silva by turning him into a doll. Mash, failing to heed Lance's warning, blunders right into Magia Lupus headquarters and bluntly asks why Abel is talking to a doll.
7	7	"Mash Burnedead and the Puppet Master"; Transliteration: "Masshu Bāndeddo to Ningyō no Mahōtsukai" (Japanese: マッシュ・バーンデッドと人形の魔法使い)	Directed by : Naoaki Shibuta; Storyboarded by : Takeshi Furuta	Hisashi Higashijima	May 27, 2023	January 12, 2025
Abel wants to return the world to a "survival of the fittest" mentality, as "equality for all" means no opportunity for strong people to advance. He uses his dolls to steal Mash's gold coin. Mash discovers cutting their strings returns the dolls to humans, freeing Silva. Abel realises Mash used super fast sleight of hand to swap the coin he stole with a button, surprising him. Silva is confused that Mash saved him just because it was the right thing to do. Lemon reveals Mash has Adler's only gold coin, but Lang has fifteen. Mash and Lance are later attacked by Magia Lupus members Sixth Magic Fang Olore, who transforms into a shark, and Seventh Magic Fang Anser, who controls a magical shuriken, wagering gold coins on who wins. Mash is sent to Olore's underwater pocket dimension to fight Olore. Lance crushes Anser and his shuriken with gravity magic. Mash swims at over 10 kilometres an hour and knocks Olore unconscious. Lance claims their gold coin before they are retrieved by Second Magic Fang Abyss, a masked Magia Lupus who can negate people's spells and moves faster than Mash can punch. After leaving he realizes Mash did manage to crack his mask and wonders if Mash is as unique as him.
8	8	"Mash Burnedead and the Wolves of Magic"; Transliteration: "Masshu Bāndeddo to Ōkami no Mahōtsukai-tachi" (Japanese: マッシュ・バーンデッドと狼の魔法使いたち)	Ryo Nakano	Saki Hisamatsu	June 3, 2023	January 19, 2025
Lance decides they should attack Lang at their dorm, even though dorm locations are strict secrets. Tom and a dozen other students experience a nightmare of being trapped and awaken almost totally drained of magic. Lemon gives Mash a cream puff plush toy she made as a lucky charm. Lance is certain Magia Lupus are responsible so he, Mash, Finn and Dot patrol the school overnight and discover Lemon turned into one of Abel's dolls. They follow her to a concealed door and, after Lance and Dot fail to open it magically, Mash simply tears it off its hinges. They find an underground arena where a Lang student, Shuen Getsuku, offers to duel them on the orders of Magia's Third Fang. Dot decides to duel. Headmaster Wahlberg is warned by the Bureau of Magic six death row prisoners recently escaped, assisted by Innocent Zero, Dot defeats his opponent but a spell separates the four to make them easier to defeat. Lance faces Third Fang Wirth. Finn and Dot jointly face Fifth Fang Love and Fourth Fang Milo. Mash faces Abyss who has realised Mash is magic-less but sympathises with him as his power to negate spells is similarly despised by magic society.
9	9	"Mash Burnedead and the Accelerated Battle"; Transliteration: "Masshu Bāndeddo to Kasoku no Mahōtsukai" (Japanese: マッシュ・バーンデッドと加速の魔法使い)	Directed by : Keisuke Watanabe; Storyboarded by : Tomoya Tanaka	Tomomi Ishikawa	June 10, 2023	January 26, 2025
Mud Magic user Wirth invites Lance to join Magia Lupus, claiming it will make Lance stronger than Adler could. Lance refuses, believing Wirth is weak for relying on others for strength. Wirth summons mud demon Mudero. Lance, having figured out the damage absorbing properties of Wirth's mud, manipulates gravity to pull Mudero apart. Wirth is defeated but Lance sympathises with him and respects the effort he put into training. Abyss cuts Mash several times and reveals a relic is draining Lemon's magic; in 30 minutes she will become magicless permanently. Abyss impales Mash, but by tensing his stomach muscles he prevents the sword being pulled out and head-butts Abyss, breaking his mask, revealing his Evil-Eye which is despised by magic society for its magic nullifying power. Abyss casts a spell that makes Mash move slower. Mash smashes the ground, limiting the places Abyss can move, and defeats him with a German Suplex. Abyss despises his Evil-Eye which his parents tried to kill him for, and now all he has is his loyalty to Abel. Mash offers to be his friend since to him the Evil-eye is not scary so there is no possibility he would ever hate him. Abyss is certain even Mash would come to hate him one day but warns Mash he has not seen Abel's true power yet. Mash decides to beat up Abel anyway then get cream puffs with Abyss.
10	10	"Mash Burnedead and the Divine Visionary"; Transliteration: "Masshu Bāndeddo to Kami Satorusha no Otoko" (Japanese: マッシュ・バーンデッドと神覚者の男)	Masakazu Obara	Hisashi Higashijima	June 17, 2023	February 2, 2025
An Adler dorm prefect follows directions on a note and finds the concealed door. Love, an emotionally unstable Tornado magic user, decides to kill Dot from jealousy when he claims to be engaged to Lemon. Dot creates a smokescreen to try steal her wand but is trapped inside a tornado. Love reveals Milo set a trap on the concealed door; unless they defeat Milo in 30 minutes Mash will turn to stone. Dot remembers his sister telling him it's ok to fight back, especially to protect a friend. He breaks free of the tornado, revealing under his headband is the warding cross Ira Kreuz, meaning he has the innate ability to increase his magic power based on his emotional state. Love is so scared of his raging power she surrenders. Milo, a Stone magic prodigy, is instantly defeated by the Adler prefect, Divine Visionary Rayne Ames, a Sword magic user and Finn's older brother. Love escapes while Rayne encounters Mash and realises he is the student Wahlberg told him he could trust. He too warns Mash about Abel but also informs him if he defeats Abel and wins all his stolen coins Mash will instantly be a candidate to be the newest Divine Visionary. Rayne continues with his own mission while Mash finally reaches Abel.
11	11	"Mash Burnedead and the Survival of the Fittest"; Transliteration: "Masshu Bāndeddo to Jakuniku Kyōshoku" (Japanese: マッシュ・バーンデッドと弱肉強食)	Directed by : Harume Kosaka; Storyboarded by : Kazuki Ohashi	Saki Hisamatsu & Hisashi Higashijima	June 24, 2023	February 9, 2025
Abel takes control of Mash to make him kill himself, but he just snaps the magic strings. Abel instead summons doll-Finn, reasoning Mash will not hurt a friend, but Mash snaps his strings by throwing his gold coin at them using his curveball technique. Mash succeeds in kicking Abel in the face, but Abel manages to fully turn Mash into a doll. He tries to take his coin but finds only a cream-puff, followed by doll-Mash punching him from self-preservation instinct overriding the magic, returning him to normal. Infuriated Abel summons Harm-Puppet, his strongest doll, but again Mash smashes the doll, destroys its strings and smashes Abel's head into the floor. Abel recalls his mother was a kind woman who tried to help the less fortunate, until a commoner killed her just for being a noble, leading to Abel's absolute belief that the weak deserve to be used. He nonetheless admits Mash defeated him, surrenders his coins and frees every student he turned into dolls including Finn, Lemon and Dot but Lance remains missing. Elsewhere, Rayne finds Lance is actually a disguised member of Innocent Zero searching the school for something, but since Abel has failed to find it he rushes off to kill Abel, leaving Rayne to fight cannibalistic serial killer Jon Pierre.
12	12	"Mash Burnedead and the Magic Mirror"; Transliteration: "Masshu Bāndeddo to Mahō no Kagami" (Japanese: マッシュ・バーンデッドと魔法の鏡)	Directed by : Tsuyoshi Tobita; Storyboarded by : Takeshi Furuta	Hisashi Higashijima	July 1, 2023	February 16, 2025
The Innocent Zero mage arrives to kill Abel. Mash obliviously covers him in cream due to a poorly timed sneeze, bewildering everybody. The mage realises with some disgust that Mash is who he is looking for. Abyss is almost killed saving Abel, with the mage realising he only missed a fatal blow with his Carbon magic because Mash threw a perfectly aimed rock at his wand. Abel is confused why Abyss tried to save him. Mash points out Abyss was probably grateful Abel accepted him when nobody else did. Abel remembers his mother telling him the importance of empathy and distracts the mage, allowing Mash to punch him only to find his skin protected by indestructible carbon. Refusing to believe Mash is using physical strength only, the mage gloatingly uses a Spell-flection Mirror to reflect Mash's spells back at him, but Mash simply smashes it. This unintentionally reveals to everyone that Mash has only used physical strength since joining the academy because he is Magic-less. The mage reveals his name is Cell War before teleporting away. Abel takes Abyss to the infirmary. Mash's friends decide to keep his secret, until they remember Abel's 100 freed dolls are human again and heard everything, meaning Mash's secret is exposed. Cell reports to his father he has finally located Mash.

=== Season 2: The Divine Visionary Candidate Exam Arc (2024) ===
No. overall	No. in season	Title	Directed by	Chief animation directed by	Original release date	English air date	Ref.
13	1	"Mash Burnedead and the Divine Visionaries"; Transliteration: "Masshu Bāndeddo to Shinkakusha-tachi" (Japanese: マッシュ・バーンデッドと神覚者たち)	Directed by : Keisuke Shiraishi; Storyboarded by : Tomoya Tanaka	Hisashi Higashijima	January 6, 2024	November 9, 2025	
Mash's status as a Magic-less spreads around the academy. So far, Mash's bizarre semi-friendship with the defeated Magia Lupus members has made students too scared to tell the instructors. Abyss informs Mash that Innocent Zero have taken a dangerous interest in him. He also reveals Abel is not a genuine three line mage; his third line was given to him artificially by Innocent Zero who will want to punish Abel for his recent failures. Mash is abruptly summoned by the Bureau of Magic to prove he is a Magic-less. Many Divine Visionaries call for his execution, except Divine Visionary Ryoh Grantz, who believes lack of magic is meaningless if the same results can be achieved by hard work, which Mash has proven repeatedly. The judge, Mr. Bless, is revealed to be implanted with a Magiparasite that feeds on mana until the victim dies. Via the parasite, Innocent Zero threaten a full scale war if their property is harmed; i.e. Mash. As no one with mana can touch it, Mash simply rips the parasite out, saving Bless's life. The Divine Visionaries argue over whether to obey the law and execute Mash or let him live to avoid war. Headmaster Wahlberg interrupts to give his opinion.
14	2	"Mash Burnedead and the Home Visit"; Transliteration: "Masshu Bāndeddo to Jikka" (Japanese: マッシュ・バーンデッドと実家)	Directed by : Yukihiro Miyamoto; Storyboarded by : Takeshi Furuta	Saki Hisamatsu	January 13, 2024	November 16, 2025	
Wahlberg suggests Mash could be vital in understanding Innocent Zero. Mr. Bless requests the execution be delayed so Visionary Orter Madl decides Mash may live as a weapon against Innocent Zero, but must prove his value as a weapon by legitimately becoming the newest Visionary. Dot insists they celebrate Mash's survival by going into town for some fun. There, Lance reveals the visionary exam will be held sooner than usual, but he still intends to beat Mash to it for his sister's sake. While shopping, Lance and Finn look for new wands. Mash notices a metal wand the shopkeeper claims has been there over 1000 years as it is so heavy no one has been able to move it. Mash picks it up straight away, flooding the shop as the wand was also blocking a spring of magic Elf Water. The shopkeeper is so amazed he gives Mash the wand for free. Orter secretly sends Orca prefect Margarette to ensure Mash misses the exam. Mash takes his friends to visit Regro who is amazed Mash has friends and, according to Lemon, a future wife. Margarette is stopped from approaching Regro's house by Rayne who suspected Orter would try to sabotage Mash before the exam.
15	3	"Rayne Ames and God's Gift"; Transliteration: "Rein Eimuzu to Kami ni Erabareta Chikara" (Japanese: レイン・エイムズと神に選ばれた力)	Directed by : Tsuyoshi Tobita; Storyboarded by : Toshinori Narita	Tomomi Ishikawa	January 20, 2024	November 23, 2025	
Margarette Macaron is heading towards Mash's house in order to make Mash unable to take the Divine Visionary Election Exam when they encounter Rayne Ames who stands in their way. A few years ago, Macaron had participated in a hands-on magic battle experiment, where the subjects compete against each other, and came out on top, so as they battle Rayne Ames, Margarette underestimates Rayne. Meanwhile back at Mash's house, he and his dormitory mates are playing games. Mash loses badly and leaves the house. His friends think that he is leaving because he lost in the game, when in reality he is just trying to eat his extra-large Choux Cream. He lands in the place where Rayne and Margarette are battling and overhears Rayne defending Mash. While this is happening, Wahlberg is having a talk with a student and explains that the difference between two-lined magicians and three-lined magicians is that the three-lined magicians are those chosen by god and that Rayne Ames is the first magician to become a three-lined magician at such a young age. When a three-lined magician takes up their wand it shows its true self. As Wahlberg is explaining, Margarette Macaron – who had been convinced of their win in the battle against Rayne Ames – is taken aback when they learn that Rayne is a three-lined magician, but after receiving his attack, Margarette flees with their comrades and this time Mash comes out and thanks Rayne for defending him. A few days later, before the start of the Divine Visionary Selection Exam, Mash is confronted by Orter Maddle. The Exam supervisor explains what the exam is going to be about and begins the exam.
16	4	"Mash Burnedead and the Brawny Balloon"; Transliteration: "Masshu Bāndeddo to Kyōko na Fūsen" (Japanese: マッシュ・バーンデッドと強固な風船)	Yuki Watanabe	Kento Toya	January 27, 2024	November 30, 2025	
The 12 entrants compete for 9 keys while avoiding three axe-wielding minotaurs that are immune to magic. Their injuries also heal instantly, making them impossible to take down. Mash is asked to team up by Max, who can alter the size of objects. They locate the key inside a balloon-like bag made-up of the bladder of a Troll Swim-fish. They must inflate until it pops, but touching it causes an alarm that alerts and attracts the minotaur. Max enlarges the air hole while Mash, by breakdancing beneath it, creates a tornado powerful enough to force air inside and pop it. Elsewhere, the keys are obtained by Lance, Dot, Margarette and three others. Dot also assists Finn in obtaining the key. Mash offers Max the key since his magic earned it, but Max insists Mash have it as he is an honourable man. After Mash leaves, Max is attacked by Carpaccio of Orca dorm, despite already having the ninth key. Carpaccio provokes Mash but a fight is avoided by the examiner announcing stage 2 of the exam. Three teams of three members must battle to smash each other's crystals until only one team remains. Unfortunately, Lance is on another team, and Mash and Dot are both so clumsy they smash their own crystals, meaning to win they must somehow keep Finn's crystal safe at all costs. However, first they have to meet up because just like in the first stage their starting points are separate.
17	5	"Finn Ames and the Friend"; Transliteration: "Fin Eimzu to Tomodachi" (Japanese: フィン・エイムズと友達)	Ryo Nakano	Hisashi Higashijima	February 3, 2024	December 7, 2025	
There exist 13 ancient wands known as Master Canes that bestow blessings on those who can wield them. Carpaccio captures Finn, but when Finn tries to resist Carpaccio's magic causes stab wounds all over his body; Margarette reveals Carpaccio possesses a Master Cane that transfers damage Carpaccio receives to his opponent via a Goddess statue. Finn refuses to surrender his crystal as Mash's life depends on it. Carpaccio prepares to make a fatal wound but Mash appears and slams Carpaccio's head through a wall, though it is Mash who receives the injury. Carpaccio reveals the Master Cane chose him the moment he was born so he has never once experienced pain. Mash unleashes a volley of rapid punches that only bore Carpaccio. However, he is shocked when his statue starts to crack as it cannot keep up. In response the statue attacks Mash directly, so Mash uses his finger strength to mould his metal wand into a tennis racket, firing rocks repeatedly at the cracked statue until she shatters completely. Utterly defenceless without his Master Wand, Mash knocks Carpaccio unconscious with a single, very painful, blow from his racket. The audience cannot believe a magic-less beat a Master Cane. Mash thanks Finn for fighting to protect his life. Experiencing pain for the first time, Carpaccio realises that, in terms of sheer willpower, even Finn possesses more strength than he does.
18	6	"Mash Burnedead and You Look, You Lose Your Life"; Transliteration: "Masshu Bāndeddo to Abunai Atchi Muite Hoi" (Japanese: マッシュ・バーンデッドと危ないアッチ向いてホイ)	Directed by : Harume Kosaka; Storyboarded by : Marr	Yū Saitō	February 17, 2024	December 14, 2025	
Margarette defeats both Carpaccio's teammates so stage 2 ends with Mash, Finn, Dot, Lance, Margarette and another student named Leblanc Russel having passed. Margarette receives implied permission from Divine Visionary Orter Madl to destroy Mash in stage 3. Mash meets Divine Visionary Kaldo Gehenna, who offers to grant Mash an immediate pass on the exam if he beats him in 3 games of "You Look, You Lose". Mash wins if he avoids looking where Kaldo points and Kaldo wins if his magic attacks force Mash to look where he is pointing. Mash dodges the first attack, punches away the second, then explosively jumps over the third which would have been fatal if it touched him. He then loses by accident when a passing owl steals his cream puff, so Kaldo declares it a draw but is puzzled why Mash is trying so hard to become Divine Visionary when it is clear Margarette is going to win. The third stage is announced as 1 versus 1 duels until only one remains. The first duel is Mash versus Margarette with Kaldo and Orter both watching very closely. Mash barely dodges Margarette's first spell, manages to grab them and performs his biggest, most explosive suplex yet on them, yet when the dust clears, Margarette is not only unharmed, they are enjoying themselves.
19	7	"Mash Burnedead and the Magical Maestro"; Transliteration: "Masshu Bāndeddo to Oto no Mahōtsukai" (Japanese: マッシュ・バーンデッドと音の魔法使い)	Directed by : Jun Takahashi; Storyboarded by : Susumu Nishizawa	Saki Hisamatsu	February 24, 2024	December 21, 2025	
A dark mage approaches the academy with dragons, seeking Mash. Sensing Mash is holding back to protect something in his pocket, Margarette allows him to set it aside safely so he can fully focus; another cream puff. During their next clash Margarette sends a sound wave Mash cannot punch away, bursting his ear drums. Bored by the lack of a real challenge, Margarette causes a musical explosion with Mash at the centre, though Mash avoids damage by tunnelling underground so the earth absorbs the sound waves. Margarette decides to reveal their true form and transforms into a petite person able to move faster than sound, causing Mash to collapse simply by whispering in his ear. The Bureau of Magic prepares for battle as they learn Innocent Zero himself is approaching. Mash learns to counter their speed so Margarette summons their Funeral Bell, which will kill the whole audience in one minute unless Mash surpasses their speed and steals their wand. Mash catches them with seconds to spare and breaks the wand, saving the audience. Margarette admits defeat just as Innocent Zero arrives to claim Mash, his son, to absorb his body into his own and obtain his ultimate, complete body. Wahlberg steps in to save Mash.
20	8	"Mash Burnedead and the Tall Tower"; Transliteration: "Masshu Bāndeddo to Ōkina Tō" (Japanese: マッシュ・バーンデッドと大きな塔)	Directed by : Keisuke Shiraishi; Storyboarded by : Takeshi Furuta	Kento Toya	March 2, 2024	January 4, 2026	
Innocent freezes everyone with his Time magic, though Wahlberg is somehow unaffected. Innocent then summons demons to attack the frozen audience so Wahlberg unfreezes Mash, his friends, Kaldo and Orter to fight them while he teleports away with Innocent to battle at a safe distance. The demons suspiciously avoid Mash so instead he races away to battle Cell War, who has summoned a black carbon tower to attack the audience from above. After Mash topples his tower, Cell is delighted at the opportunity to fight Mash after their previous encounter, yet he is shocked to find Mash does not even remember him. Dot and Lance are turned into infants by Sitter Baby, leaving them defenceless until Sitter brags his spell has reduced their magic by 90%. Lance concentrates his remaining 10% into a 1 inch spot on Sitter's back and crushes him, returning himself and Dot to normal. It's revealed that Innocent and Wahlberg were both students to Adam, the strongest dark mage in history, so their magic is equal in power. Innocent uses a forbidden spell; Living Dead, while Cell threatens to kill Mash's friends. Mash easily avoids Cell's carbon spears and punches him, revealing he finally remembered him and his attack patterns, making beating him even easier this time. Cell cannot believe Mash is even stronger than the last time.
21	9	"Wahlberg Baigan and the Magic of Darkness"; Transliteration: "Wōrubāgu Baigan to Yami no Mahō" (Japanese: ウォールバーグ・バイガンと闇の魔法)	Directed by : Tazumi Mukaiyama; Storyboarded by : Takayuki Mochimaru	Takuya Sunayama	March 9, 2024	January 11, 2026	
During his lifetime of several centuries, Adam revolutionized modern magical theory and founded both the academy and the bureau of magic to support those without magic, the Magic-less, as he believed the strong had a responsibility to protect the weak. Innocent's spell resurrects Adam's mindless body controlled by puppet master Necrosse Mance to attack Wahlberg with Adam's Dark Magic, which sends all it touches into an infinite void for eternity. However, having been trained by Adam and with his magic to control three-dimensional space, Wahlberg splits Necrosse' body into pieces then teleports him and Adam away. Cell reveals to Mash that Innocent is attempting black magic called Forbidden Magical Body Construction, which will give Innocent an immortal heart in exchange for the hearts of his six sons, of whom Mash is the youngest who went missing as a baby. As a clone created from a corpse, Cell is furious Mash is not interested in dying to make Innocent immortal and summons his strongest weapons, four diamond edged discs, intending to cut Mash apart and harvest his heart. However, with his super speed Mash dodges the discs, gets behind Cell and strangles him unconscious so the discs and black carbon tower all vanish.
22	10	"Wahlberg Baigan and the Greatest Danger"; Transliteration: "Wōrubāgu Baigan to Saidai no Kiki" (Japanese: ウォールバーグ・バイガンと最大の危機)	Directed by : Tsuyoshi Tobita; Storyboarded by : Toshinori Narita	Hisashi Higashijima	March 16, 2024	January 18, 2026	
Divine Visionary Ryoh Grantz and student Nerey Shawn approach the academy but after getting too close, Nerey is frozen by Innocent's time spell. Being powerful enough, Ryoh is unaffected and rushes to help but finds everyone safe, having defeated the demons and Innocent's men. Mash rushes off to find Wahlberg shortly before the unconscious Cell is teleported away, causing Orter to realize another of Innocent's servants is hiding nearby. Innocent manages to severely age half of Wahlberg's body so his left arm crumbles to dust. Wahlberg recalls as a boy he was very fearful and avoided making friends until Adam befriended him and convinced him to start going to school. For betraying Adam's teachings Wahlberg prepares to use a most powerful spell against Innocent; Uranus Inclination, which unlocks the God magic in Wahlberg's wand of Uranus, God of the Skies. The God Uranus prepares to delete Innocent from existence, and even though Innocent freezes time and injures Wahlberg, Uranus delivers a blast of spatial magic that briefly illuminates the entire country. Barely alive, Wahlberg is astounded when Innocent simply reverses time on Uranus so the blast never happened. Innocent prepares to kill the defenceless Wahlberg, until Mash appears from nowhere and kicks Innocent in the face.
23	11	"Mash Burnedead and the Origin of the Greatest Magic User"; Transliteration: "Masshu Bāndeddo to Saikyō no Mahō Tsukai no Hajimari" (Japanese: マッシュ・バーンデッドと最強の魔法使いの始まり)	Directed by : Keimi Kō; Storyboarded by : Yutaka Yamamoto	Yū Saitō	March 23, 2024	January 25, 2026	
Innocent steals Wahlberg's spatial magic and even fights hand to hand with Mash. However, overusing Wahlbergs's vast magical power starts to affect his body. Wahlberg realises Innocent is seeking an immortal body that can withstand multiple stolen powers without breaking down. Mash can only vaguely understand that Innocent wants to become the strongest human, increasing his desire to fight him. Unable to fully control his body, Innocent teleports away to recover, but before leaving he casts a spell to fuse the bodies of his dead demons into one giant monster to flatten the arena. With Innocent gone, the students in the arena are unfrozen and start to panic. The monster is protected by the same concealed Innocent Zero member who saved Cell, whom Orter is still searching for. Despite its titanic size, Mash not only stops the monster attacking, he starts to drag it backwards away from the arena. With the entire academy watching Mash fight to save them, many students start to wonder if it matters that Mash is magic-less, and soon are all cheering in support of him. Mash succeeds in throwing the monster all the way to the mountains where it explodes. Everyone celebrates, including Lemon who offers Mash a kiss, but he had already started eating another cream puff. Wahlberg considers that Mash might be the one most suited to carry on Adam's dream.
24	12	"Mash Burnedead and His Good Friends"; Transliteration: "Masshu Bāndeddo to Yoi Tomodachi" (Japanese: マッシュ・バーンデッドと良い友達)	Tomoya Tanaka	Hisashi Higashijima & Tomomi Ishikawa	March 30, 2024	February 1, 2026	
Orter is disappointed Kaldo is sympathetic to Mash. To hide Mash's involvement, the Bureau tells the world the Divine Visionaries drove Innocent away. Wahlberg worries now Innocent can control both Time and Space he might be the most powerful magician alive, and hopes Mash can somehow stop him. Lance reminds Mash they still have exams and if Mash fails even one he will be expelled then executed. Unfortunately, Mash's brain overheats when studying and he makes a mad dash to escape. Finn finds him preparing to bury himself before the Bureau can execute him, but Finn convinces him to try so they can graduate together. After days of effort, Mash just barely passes his exams. A civilian mob led by an ambitious priest invades the academy, having learned a magic-less is a candidate to become Divine Visionary. Outraged, Lemon expresses her support of Mash, but the mob hurl stones at her. Mash saves her, traps the priest in his own iron cage, and announces to the shocked mob he will become Divine Visionary and prove them all wrong. Wahlberg further appeases the mob until they leave. After, he warns Mash that now his identity is public his friends may be labelled criminals too if he is executed, so becoming Divine Visionary is no longer just about saving himself, but his friends' lives as well.

== Recap special ==
No.	Title	Original release date
6.5	"Mash Burnedead and the Mysterious Letter"; Transliteration: "Masshu Bāndeddo to Fushigi na Tegami" (Japanese: マッシュ・バーンデッドと不思議な手紙)	May 20, 2023
Mash sends a letter home to his father narrating his experiences at the academy so far, serving as a recap of the first six episodes.
