= FLCL Progressive =

- Season 2
- Cover for the Blu-ray release of FLCL Progressive in Japan
- No. of episodes: 6

Release
- Original network: Adult Swim
- Original release: June 3 – July 7, 2018

Season chronology
- ← Previous; Season 1 Next → Season 3: Alternative

The second season of the FLCL anime series, titled FLCL Progressive, (Note: Also typed as FLCL: Progressive, with the colon being used on an inconsistent basis since the announcement of 2 new seasons in March 2022.) is produced by Production I.G, Toho, and Adult Swim's production arm Williams Street. Progressive was chief directed by Katsuyuki Motohiro, with screenplay by Hideto Iwai. It originally aired from June 3 to July 7, 2018, in the United States on Adult Swim's Toonami programming block. In Japan, Progressive received a theatrical screening as a compilation film, with it opening on September 28, 2018. In addition to providing several tracks for the season, the Pillows performed the ending theme song "Spiky Seeds".

In this season, Haruko returns to Earth years later after a failed attempt to contain Atomsk, although she did manage to absorb him. Placing herself as a middle school homeroom teacher, Haruko targets a 14-year-old girl named Hidomi Hibajiri through her classmate and eventual love interest Ko Ide.

== Episodes ==
No. overall	No. in season	Title	Animated by	Directed by	Written by	Storyboarded by	Original release date
7	1	"Re:Start"; Transliteration: "Saisuta" (Japanese: サイスタ)	Production I.G	Kazuto Arai	Hideto Iwai	Kazuto Arai	June 3, 2018
Hidomi Hibajiri, a middle school student living in Ohzu City, has a dream about rotting away in a destroyed world, turning into a robot at the gaze of a large eye, and fighting giant irons. She heads to her class with barely any emotion as a white-haired woman with a Fender Jazzmaster guitar watches her from afar. Meanwhile, Ko Ide brags to his friends about his relationship with the homeroom teacher, but leaves the details vague. After their homeroom teacher performs a strange lesson, Hidomi later returns to help her mother with their family's cafe. As Hidomi's mother talks about her missing father and possibly "moving on," the white-haired woman from before smashes a vintage Chevy Bel-Air into Hidomi's head, which "unfortunately" leaves her alive. The woman remarks that Hidomi keeps her unique cat ear-shaped headphones on to drown out the world, warning Hidomi that her body will rot as a result, and telling her to be careful of "the woman on the Vespa." That night, as Hidomi ponders what she meant, a large mechanical creature tries to attack her in her room. As Hidomi runs from the creature, it suddenly throws Ide at her. As the two run away from the creature, Ide explains that it came from his head. The two then run into a junkyard and are cornered by the creature. As Hidomi begins to "overflow," the white-haired woman appears again in her Chevy and destroys the creature before carrying off a wounded Ide; an orange-haired Haruko Haruhara secretly watches from afar. The next morning, the white-haired woman introduces herself as Julia Jinyu, a new worker at the cafe. At school, the homeroom teacher goes on a rant about "being adults" and "having only two wheels" that seems to brainwash the whole class, save for Hidomi and Ide, revealing herself as Haruko.
8	2	"Freebie Honey"; Transliteration: "Furihani" (Japanese: フリハニ)	Production GoodBook	Toshihisa Kaiya	Hideto Iwai	Toshihisa Kaiya	June 10, 2018
Hidomi wakes up from a nightmare about being in a gory zombie movie and heads to school, where Haruko delivers a cult-like speech over the flawed nature of adults while giving the class their yearbooks: revealed from Hidomi's perspective to be crude stick-figure drawings despite the rest of the class being deluded in fabricated memories of events that never occurred. Later, Haruko asks Hidomi to give Ide, who was absent, his classwork. Hidomi heads to a slum on the outskirts of town, where Goro reveals that Ide has been hard at work making and selling machinery and getting beaten in the process. Watching Ko being beaten by some shady customers causes Hidomi to get a nosebleed, and she starts to overflow, but she faints before anything happens. She later wakes up in Ide's room; after an awkward moment, Haruko appears with a video camera, and Jinyu crashes the scene with her Chevy Bel-Air, which has transformed into a humanoid mech. Haruko counters by attaching a leash to Ko and summoning the same mechanical creature from the first episode through Hidomi's N.O. portal. As the two women fight each other, Jinyu revealing herself to be an off-shoot of Haruko while attempting to convince her to stop chasing Atomsk down after the first attempt which created her, Hidomi overcomes her inhibitor and transforms into a tiny mechanical doll, blowing Haruko away with tremendous force before returning to human form. Jinyu then converts her Chevy into a medical device and places both Hidomi and Ide into it, Haruko now knowing Hidomi is her target. Hidomi comes to and, finally remembering to give Ide his classwork, the two begin to laugh together.
9	3	"Stone Skipping"; Transliteration: "Mizukiri" (Japanese: ミズキリ)	Production I.G	Yuki Ogawa	Hideto Iwai	Yuki Ogawa	June 17, 2018
About three months after the last incident, Haruko takes some of her class to the beach. Hidomi finds herself dragged along with Jinyu, who insists on keeping her from Haruko. Meanwhile, calling Goro's bluff of having a girlfriend, Ide and Marco meet a shy girl with flowerpot named Aiko. As Jinyu and Haruko talk about their goals, the kids enjoy their time on the beach, playing volleyball and building a sandcastle. Despite agreeing to a momentarily ceasefire with Jinyu, Haruko buries her under sand and cement before abducting Hidomi before anyone can notice they are missing. As Marco uncovers that Goro is actually paying Aiko and is given her potted plant, Ide, having realized Hidomi is gone, finds her in a crumbling, dilapidated Medical Mechanica factory on an operating table, where Haruko is trying to make her overflow. Seeing Hidomi's half-naked body causes Ide to overflow instead, and a giant blob monster erupts from his forehead. During the ensuing battle, Hidomi accidentally kisses Ide's chest, causing a large floating junk pile to emerge from her body. With Jinyu's help, Ide frees Hidomi, but Haruko convinces him to try to remove Hidomi's headphones. When he touches them, the headphones' security protocol activates, screwing them into the sides of Hidomi's head as the pile of junk falls back to Earth. Reluctantly, Haruko opts to team up with Jinyu to take the fight to the headphones' creators: Medical Mechanica.
10	4	"LooPQR"; Transliteration: "Rarirure" (Japanese: ラリルレ)	Production I.G	Yoshihide Ibata	Hideto Iwai	Yoshihide Ibata	June 24, 2018
Following her headphones locking on her head, Hidomi's personality completely flips, her upbeat yet eccentric subconsciousness manifesting itself, which concerns most of the people around her. Jinyu formulates a plan to attack the active Medical Mechanica plant in town to destroy the signal keeping the headphones in security mode. Meanwhile, Eye Patch and Masurao are shown to possess the remains of an inactive Canti which they have been using to develop N.O.-powered technology. They attempt to find the missing flowerpot that Masurao's daughter Aiko gave to Goro, revealed to have the ability to reverse N.O. Channel polarity. Jinyu, Haruko, and Ide snatch Hidomi off the street in Jinyu's car and fly her to the top of the Medical Mechanica plant, only to reach a dead end when they realize they have no way to enter the plant. While Haruko and Jinyu argue, Hidomi begins playing with Aiko's flowerpot and accidentally drops it on Ide's head, reversing his portal's polarity and sucking Jinyu and Haruko into the factory's interior. Inside the plant, Jinyu, wanting nothing more than to allow Atomsk to remain free, attempts to reason with Haruko before unintentionally provoking her, sparking a fight. The damage they cause to the factory's interior deactivates the headphones, allow them to use Hidomi's N.O. Channel to continue their fight outside. Meanwhile, having manifested a N.O. Channel from an earlier encounter with Hidomi, Marco is testing a Viking Cruise ship ride at a nearby theme park when it suddenly launches him at the plant; a giant bamboo shoot sprouts from his portal, and a small robot puppet climbs up it, getting involved in the fight against Haruko. Ide tries to rescue Hidomi as the car begins rolling off the side of the plant, and Jinyu catches them, only to be fatally wounded by Haruko. Haruko destroys the bamboo shoot and then devours Jinyu, the latter act restoring Haruko to her original pink-haired self. She then asks for Hidomi's help in absorbing Atomsk once more, but Hidomi, having caught glimpses of Haruko's previous attempt and understanding her intentions with regard to Atomsk's power, puts her headphones back on and refuses.
11	5	"Fool on the Planet"; Transliteration: "Furupura" (Japanese: フルプラ)	Signal.MD	Kei Suezawa	Hideto Iwai	Kei Suezawa	June 30, 2018
A smiling Hidomi awakens from a dream of a colorless, devastated world overrun by Medical Mechanica factories that ended with her running down a beach. However, in a flashback shown in manga style, Hidomi becomes upset when she learns her mother intends to close the café. Meanwhile, Eye Patch and Masurao travel to the outskirts of Ohzu City so they can use the Interstellar Immigration Department Space Elevator to dispose of Canti's remains. Later at school, a seemingly pregnant Haruko (actually full from eating Jinyu) announces her retirement from teaching to marry her beloved. After giving the class a false anecdote about how she met Atomsk, she sends them off to the amusement park to find love. Only Ide and Hidomi remain, with the former using Jinyu's guitar to confront Haruko in the school's empty swimming pool while demanding that she stop dragging Hidomi into her plans. Haruko easily overpowers Ide in the duel, expressing disappointment that he has failed to learn anything. As she tries to seduce him, he retorts that she doesn't satisfy him. When Hidomi finds Haruko on top of Ide, she overflows with her power reducing Ide to a featureless husk while Haruko halfheartedly apologizes and leaves. At the husk's gasping request, Hidomi takes it in her arms and stands under the pool shower with it before it inflates like a balloon and floats up into the stratosphere. In orbit, Ide's husk is picked up by the Interstellar Immigration Department's Lost-and-found satellite and grounded before an elderly woman who feeds it to Canti's head after it suddenly whirls to life. At the theme park, revealed to be a front for the Interstellar Immigration Department, Tonkichi begins the operation of collecting N.O. energy from the high concentration of adolescents present while combining the park's rides into a large mecha to attack the Medical Mechanica factory. Meanwhile, having regained her figure once she finished absorbing Jinyu, Haruko finds herself being attacked by a furious Hidomi after she used her power to augment herself into a cyborg. As they duel, Hidomi asserts that Haruko's obsession with Atomsk makes her "no different from the rest of them" and that she is "just a girl in love". Their fight is interrupted by a bright red light in the sky, as Haruko whispers that Atomsk has arrived on Earth.
12	6	"Our Running"; Transliteration: "Awaran" (Japanese: アワラン)	Production I.G	Hiroshi Ikehata	Hideto Iwai	Hiroshi Ikehata	July 7, 2018
The battle between the Interstellar Immigration Bureau and Medical Mechanica reaches its climax while Haruko baits Hidomi into using her N.O. energy to trap Atomsk, only for them to be sucked into the being's own N.O. channel with Haruko regaining her original guitar. The Medical Mechanica factory makes it attempts to capture Atomsk by firing mochi-like projectiles across Ohzu, trapping most of the populace in a petrified state. Eye Patch and Masurao are hit by one of the mochi projectiles, and Masurao tells Aiko that he doesn't intend to activate her since he knew she was gathering money to buy her own freedom from the Immigration Bureau and pleads for her to flee. A guilt-ridden Aiko recruits Goro and Hidomi's mother to recover the flowerpot, which activates her hidden functions and opens up a direct line of communication to Hidomi through Canti's head. Hidomi takes the opportunity to make amends with her mother, telling her that they don't have to keep the cafe open to wait for her father, but simply so they can continue living together. As Aiko proceeds to take out the Medical Mechanica factory while returning Goro's feelings, Hidomi hesitates in removing her limiter before a fully restored Canti removes the earphones for her. This causes Hidomi to turn into the Canti-like robot from her dream as she, Haruko, and Canti return to Earth where the robot is revealed to have both Ide and Atomsk inside him. Both Hidomi and Haruko battle to reach Canti, culminating in them kissing the robot at the same time to suck out their respective quarry from him. Hidomi is able to rescue a fully restored Ide while Haruko has seemingly absorbed Atomsk, only for the entity for force himself out and fly back into space, leaving Jinyu in its place to console Haruko. As Haruko and Jinyu part ways, Haruko quickly recovers from her setback and resumes her hunt for Atomsk, while the restored citizens proceed to rebuild Ohzu. Hidomi, having finally shed her insecurity, begins a relationship with Ide.

== Home media release ==
=== Japanese ===
Toho Animation (Japan – Region 2/A)
Title	Disc	Runtime	Release date	Ref.
FLCL Progressive: The Movie	Blu-ray	136 minutes	October 31, 2018	

=== English ===
Warner Bros. Television (North America – Region 1/A)
Edition	Disc	Episodes	Release date	Ref.
Progressive: Complete Series	DVD	1–6	October 1, 2019	
FLCL 2 Series Collection	Blu-ray	1–6	February 4, 2020	
