= Housing Complex C =

Japanese anime television series

- Teaser visual featuring Kimi Shirokado (left) and Yuri Koshide (right)

C団地 (C Danchi)
- Genre: Supernatural horror
- Anime television series
- Directed by: Yūji Nara
- Written by: Amphibian
- Music by: Toshifumi Kawamura
- Studio: Akatsuki
- Licensed by: The Cartoon Network, Inc.
- English network: CA: Adult Swim; US: Adult Swim (Toonami)
- Original run: October 2, 2022 – October 23, 2022
- Episodes: 4

Housing Complex C (Japanese: C団地, Hepburn: C Danchi) is an anime television miniseries that aired in October 2022 in the United States on Adult Swim's Toonami programming block and in Canada on Adult Swim Canada.

== Plot ==
Kimi Shirokado is an eccentric little girl who lives at a low-cost housing complex called Housing Complex C in the fictional seaside town of Kurosaki. During the summer, she befriends city girl Yuri Koshide when her family moves in from Tokyo along with Middle Eastern fishing interns. A series of strange events soon occurs, from dead animals appearing on the property to tenants mysteriously disappearing with moss growing inside their apartments.

== Characters ==
Kimi Shirokado
Voiced by: Ayahi Takagaki (Japanese); Xanthe Huynh (English)
A happy-go-lucky 9-year-old girl who resides within the complex who the elderly residents dote on as her "mother" is never seen outside of her apartment. She hints that she knows more about the strange events than she lets on.
Yuri Koshide
Voiced by: Haruka Tomatsu (Japanese); Kayli Mills (English)
A 10-year-old girl from Tokyo who moves into the complex with her parents and befriends Kimi, acting like a big sister figure to her.
Seichi Koshide
Voiced by: Wataru Hatano (Japanese); Sean Chiplock (English)
Yuri's father who works as a supervisor and consultant for the foreign workers who have arrived in Kurosaki to work at the fisheries. He and his family have ulterior motives for coming to the complex.
Keiko Koshide
Voiced by: Sayaka Ohara (Japanese); Suzie Yeung (English)
Yuri's mother and Seichi's wife who moves into the complex with his foreign workers.
Takashi Takamura
Voiced by: Kazuhiro Yamaji (Japanese); Jake Eberle (English)
An elderly professor and resident of the complex whose investigation into the strange occurrences at the complex leads to his eventual death once he pieced it all together at the cost of his sanity, leaving behind his journal with a detail of his findings, which Kimi gives to Kobayashi.
Kisou Kobayashi
Voiced by: Yusaku Yara (Japanese); Doug Stone (English)
An elderly inhabitant of the complex and a friend of Takashi. He is a handyman by trade.
Kentaro Yoshii
Voiced by: Nobuo Tobita (Japanese); Michael Sorich (English)
An elderly inhabitant of the complex. He is a retired security guard and military soldier who is a friend of Takashi and Kisou.
Mitsuko Momochi
Voiced by: Ai Orikasa (Japanese); Caitlin Glass (English)
A middle-aged inhabitant of the complex who is the mother of Hideo.
Hideo Momochi
The son of Mitsuko who is a hikikomori.
Toshi Wada
Voiced by: Kujira (Japanese); Janis Carroll (English)
A cantankerous elderly woman at the complex who serves as the building manager and has prejudiced views towards the Middle Eastern interns due to them disrespecting the housing complex.
Kanchan Mia
Voiced by: Takaya Kuroda (Japanese); Bob Carter (English)
One of the Middle Eastern interns under Mr. Koshide. He is a brutish man who seems protective of Kimi and Yuri, is the largest of the interns, and is said to be easily manipulated.
Rubel Hossen
Voiced by: Takeshi Nishimura (Japanese); Ryan Colt Levy (English)
One of the Middle Eastern interns under Mr. Koshide, representing the group as he translates for them. He later left the complex as tensions between his group and the residents worsened, and after discovering a link to an ancient god.

== Production and release ==
The series was directed by Yūji Nara, with script and original concept by amphibian, and animated by Akatsuki. The series was produced by Williams Street with Jason DeMarco serving as executive producer; the English dub was produced by Production I.G USA. The series aired on Adult Swim's Toonami programming block from October 2 to October 23, 2022. (Note: Adult Swim listed the series premiere on October 1, 2022, at 12:00 a.m. (24:00) EDT/PDT, which is effectively October 2 at midnight) A potential televised run of the series in Japan itself currently remains in question, despite the original Japanese language version being available to stream on Max. In June 2022, Corus Entertainment confirmed through a press release that the series would also be broadcast on Adult Swim in Canada.

The opening theme song for the series is "Make Believe" performed by Ivan Kwong (AG), while the ending theme song is "Secret of the Day" performed by De Tesla.

== Episodes ==
No.	Title	Directed by (Note: Production staff information is taken from the ending credits of each episode)	Storyboarded by	Animation directed by	Original release date	U.S. viewers (millions)
1	"Optical Illusion"; Transliteration: "Me no Sakkaku" (Japanese: めのさっかく)	Tatsuya Sasaki	Yūji Nara	Kanae Komatsu, Masaaki Sakurai, Toshiaki Yamamura & Hsieh Wan Chien	October 2, 2022	0.247
In the seaside town of Kurosaki, Kimi Shirokado is an eccentric girl whose complaint about the heatwave leads to her and the senior residents of Housing Complex C finding strange things while getting an ice machine in a secret storage cellar. Over the course of the next few days, Kimi befriends a girl named Yuri Koshide, whose family moved into the housing complex, along with Middle Eastern interns. One intern named Kanchan Mia catches Kimi when she does an unexplained jump from the top of Housing Complex C. Later, Kimi brings Yuri to the storage cellar, where they find disturbing drawings belonging to a Hikikomori named Hideo. They return Hideo's pen to him, and he draws a cute picture of the two. Kimi comes to invite Hideo the next day for shaved ice and accidentally steps on his anime figurine upon noticing his bedroom door open, finding a large pile of moss inside.
2	"Mismatched Buttons"; Transliteration: "Botan no Kakechigae" (Japanese: ボタンのかけちがえ)	Akihiko Ota	Masashi Abe	Foo Shih Ming & Hsieh Wan Chien	October 9, 2022	0.146
As Hideo's disappearance is unofficially shrugged off by the local police, Kimi tries to ease tensions between the tenants and Mr. Koshide's interns with a shaved ice party. But as preparations are made, the senior tenants decide to investigate the strange piles of dead fish on the property and assume one of the interns is responsible, only for the mystery to deepen as one of them decides to stand guard. The party commences with Kentaro Yoshii realizing something is wrong when the shaved ice syrup tastes strange, finding his fellow tenant's apartment growing moss while the syrup is revealed to be contaminated with a dog's severed head.
3	"The Wheel Comes Full Circle"; Transliteration: "Moto no Mokuami" (Japanese: もとのもくあみ)	Yoshihisa Matsumoto	Yoshihisa Matsumoto	Hiroyuki Shimizu, Isamu Utsuki, Jōji Yanase & Konomi Sakurai	October 16, 2022	0.183
Takashi helps briefly defuse the housing residents and the interns, lamenting that the wheel came full circle and that watch groups would incite further mistrust, as even Kanchan is sold out by his fellow interns to Rubel's disgust. Takashi realizes the strange events are tied to the lyrics of an ancient song, but reaches a dead end until seeing Rubel off, discovering the actual Kurodo Shrine is located behind Housing Complex C, and making a horrific discovery. As the day passes on, Kimi, Yuri, and Kanchan realize Takashi is missing and try to look for him. Their search takes them to the storage cellar, where they find Hideo's drawings ripped to pieces and a back chamber, which Kimi enters, finding a pile of moss and a mural of the fish people praying to the mountain god as Yuri attempts to decipher it before Kimi pleads for her not to. The two take their leave, Kimi revealing the moss to be what remains of Takashi. Later, returning to her apartment, Kimi questions the growing embryo that she calls her "mother" if everything will go full circle.
4	"The End of the Line"; Transliteration: "Ikkan no Owari" (Japanese: いっかんの終わり)	Tatsuya Sasaki	Tatsuya Sasaki & Yūji Nara	Junko Matsushita, Kazuya Saitō, Kyoko Kotani, Noriyoshi Yamazaki, Hsieh Wan Chien & Pui Ki Pang	October 23, 2022	0.178
After Kimi gives Kobayashi Takashi's journal, he learns that his friend discovered the fish people are worshipers of the fallen god Kuzululu. They commit human sacrifices to earn the favor of the reality-warping god Iyoyoloki Soyohosu. That deity assumed the identity of Kimi, who kept the complex stuck in a year-long time loop of 2000. However, her task is made difficult by the Koshide family, who are descendants of the fish people. Kobayashi tries to reach Kimi, only to be killed by Mr. Koshide, as he and Mrs. Koshide have slaughtered almost all the residents. After retreating into the cellar with Kimi, Yuri tries to kill her. Kimi reveals her true nature as Iyoyoloki Soyohosu and summons the mutilated parts of Yuri's parents. Having grown tired of her time amongst humans, a disillusioned Kimi kills Yuri and proceeds to undo the loop. Having received the stone from Kimi earlier with instructions, Kanchan is forced to go against his faith and recites a protection spell to survive. Kanchan awakens in a renamed town of Shirosaki as it should be in the present year, as a white-haired Kimi watches him leave the ruins of Housing Complex C while blowing bubbles on the rooftop.
