= Toonami =

US television animation programming block

- Logo used since July 26, 2025
- Network: Cartoon Network (1997–2008); Kids' WB (2001–2002); Adult Swim (2012–present)
- Launched: March 17, 1997; 29 years ago (Cartoon Network); July 30, 2001; 25 years ago (Kids' WB); May 26, 2012; 14 years ago (Adult Swim)
- Closed: June 28, 2002; 24 years ago (Kids' WB); September 20, 2008; 18 years ago (Cartoon Network)
- Country of origin: United States
- Owner: Williams Street (The Cartoon Network, Inc.)
- Headquarters: 1065 Williams Street NW, Atlanta, Georgia, U.S.
- Format: Anime and action animation
- Running time: 4 hours
- Voices of: C. Martin Croker; Sonny Strait; Steve Blum; Sally Timms; Samantha Robson; Dave Wittenberg; Tom Kenny; Dana Swanson; Beau Billingslea
- Official website: www.adultswim.com/videos/toonami/

Toonami (/tuːˈnɑːmi/ too-NAH-mee) is an American late-night television programming block that broadcasts Japanese anime and action-oriented American animation on Cartoon Network's nighttime programming block, Adult Swim. (Note: Effectively, a block within another block) It was co-created by producers Sean Akins and Jason DeMarco under the supervision of Cartoon Network executive Mike Lazzo, and programmed by Williams Street (formerly Cartoon Network Productions), a subsidiary of The Cartoon Network, Inc. The name is a portmanteau of the words "cartoon" and "tsunami". The block currently airs every Saturday night from 12:00 to 4:00 a.m. ET/PT. (Note: Effectively, every Sunday morning)

Toonami was launched on March 17, 1997, by Cartoon Network as a weekday afternoon block targeting children and teens, debuting with the series ThunderCats, Voltron, and The Real Adventures of Jonny Quest; it soon incorporated anime such as Dragon Ball Z and Sailor Moon. The block is distinguished by a science fiction-themed presentation featuring an animated host navigating a spaceship. The block's format includes interstital segments with the host delivering intros, video game reviews, and music videos amid the programming. Toonami was initially hosted by Space Ghost Coast to Coast character Moltar (voiced by C. Martin Croker), and later by the robot T.O.M. (voiced by Sonny Strait and Steve Blum).

After transitioning to a Saturday night block in 2004, Toonami was discontinued on September 20, 2008, due to low ratings. It briefly returned as an April Fools' Day prank on April 1, 2012, before being revived on May 26, 2012, as a late-night block on Adult Swim. This iteration rebranded Adult Swim's Saturday night action block (originally inherited from Toonami's Midnight Run block), which primarily features anime deemed too mature for daytime programming. On May 31, 2024, a new Friday afternoon block called Toonami Rewind debuted. It aired from 5:00 to 7:00 p.m. ET/PT and showcased classic anime series. Toonami Rewind complemented Checkered Past, a Monday–Thursday block featuring older Cartoon Network series. Toonami Rewind ceased broadcasting on December 27, 2024.

== Broadcast history ==
=== Cartoon Network (1997–2008) ===
==== 1997–99: Moltar era ====
Toonami's first logo used from March 17, 1997 to January 22, 1999

Logo used from January 25, 1999 to July 9, 1999

Toonami was Cartoon Network's primary action-animation block. The block premiered on March 17, 1997, with ThunderCats, Cartoon Roulette, Voltron, another episode of Roulette, and The Real Adventures of Jonny Quest respectively as its first programs. It first took the place of Power Zone, the Super Adventures block's most recent iteration on Cartoon Network, which had been a mainstay of the network since its introduction on October 1, 1992. The block was originally hosted by Space Ghost Coast to Coast character Moltar (voiced by C. Martin Croker) at the Ghost Planet Industries building from March 17, 1997, to July 9, 1999.

==== 1999–2000: T.O.M. 1 era ====
Logo used from July 10, 1999 to February 18, 2000

On July 10, 1999, Cartoon Network retired previous host Moltar and relaunched Toonami with a new environment, the Ghost Planet Spaceship Absolution, and a new host, a robot named T.O.M. (voiced by Sonny Strait), which introduced viewers to him with this speech:

So it's a brand new Toonami, but the mission objectives remain the same. My name is TOM. I'm the new Moltar. Welcome aboard the Ghost Planet Spaceship Absolution, Cartoon Network's first and only interstellar broadcast and exploration vehicle. I'll give you the tour later. From this day forward she is completely responsible for all Toonami transmissions. I'm taking you guys into the new millennium! No big changes now, same show, same attitude; new place to do it, new guy to do it with. I'm not going to waste any more time, let's get back into it. Later.

Soon afterwards, the first program of the T.O.M. era, the Sailor Moon episode "The Cosmetics Caper", premiered. It introduced The Powerpuff Girls on Toonami, becoming the first Cartoon Network original series on the block. Also introduced that day was the Midnight Run, a late night block. It was originally a five-hour Saturday night block (technically Sunday) at midnight EST until March 2000, when it moved to weeknights in an hour-long format until January 2003. It consisted of anime such as Dragon Ball Z, Sailor Moon, Voltron, Robotech, Mobile Suit Gundam Wing, The Big O, and Outlaw Star. Midnight Run tended to have more blood and violence than its daytime counterpart, even running an uncut version of Gundam Wing between March and November 2000. One special edition that started on Friday, August 31, 2001, featured music videos such as "Clint Eastwood" by Gorillaz, and songs by Daft Punk from their 2001 album Discovery, the music videos of which constitute the 2003 Japanese-French musical Interstella 5555, and Kenna's "Hellbent". Another event was Dragon Ball Z taking over the Midnight Run for a week starting on March 26–30, 2001.

A Saturday morning incarnation, Toonami Rising Sun, ran from 2000 to 2001 at 9:00 am to noon. It later ran from 10:00 am to 1:00 pm, then 11:00 am to 1:00 pm. This block was somewhat hampered to avoid competing with sister network Kids' WB.

Starting in September 2000, Toonami presented special interactive events known as Total Immersion Events (TIEs). These TIEs took place both on-air during Toonami and online at the official site, Toonami.com, and always occurred the week that the block's most popular series, Dragon Ball Z, returned for a new season. The first TIE was The Intruder, which introduced T.O.M.'s companion, an AI matrix known as SARA (voiced by Sally Timms, singer for the British band The Mekons) The Intruder was an eight episode mini-series that aired during Toonami from September 18 to September 22, 2000—November 6, 2000, to November 24, 2000. It involved the Absolution being attacked by an alien blob known only as "the Intruder", which ultimately devoured T.O.M.

==== 2000–03: T.O.M. 2 era ====
Toonami logo used from February 21, 2000, to March 14, 2003; temporarily revived on March 18, 2017, until April 15, 2017, for its 20th anniversary

Though The Intruder resulted in the destruction of T.O.M., he was soon after upgraded by S.A.R.A. from a short Bomberman-esque character to a taller, sleeker, deeper-voiced incarnation dubbed T.O.M. 2 (voiced by Steve Blum, who has since been the voice of all subsequent incarnations of the character).

On May 15, 2001, Cartoon Network released Toonami: Deep Space Bass, the official soundtrack album to the TV block.

From July 30, 2001, until June 28, 2002, Kids' WB (also owned by Time Warner) aired a Toonami block that was, more or less, the Kids' WB lineup with the Toonami name. Although Toonami on Kids' WB brought over shows such as Sailor Moon, Dragon Ball Z, and The Powerpuff Girls to broadcast television, it was critically panned by industry observers, who noticed that the action branding of the block - which had added shows such as Generation O!, Scooby-Doo, and The Nightmare Room, a live-action series created by Goosebumps author R. L. Stine - did not translate content-wise. And while the cross promotion between Cartoon Network and Kids' WB did allow for series to be shared between the networks, most of these only lasted a short period of time. This included Dragon Ball Z and Sailor Moon appearing on Toonami on Kids' WB for only two weeks, and Cardcaptors appearing on the main Toonami block on Cartoon Network for only two weeks. In spring 2002, Kids' WB announced that they would drop the Toonami name from their weekday lineup, once again making the Toonami brand exclusive to Cartoon Network.

The TIE, Lockdown, aired between September 17–21, 2001, and included the introduction of CartoonNetwork.com's first MMORPG, called "Toonami Lockdown", as well as a record-breaking amount of page views and ratings for the network. In Lockdown T.O.M. fights to save the Absolution from an attack by a giant trash compactor. Trapped in Hyperspace, the next TIE, ran the week of September 16–20, 2002. SARA gets taken offline by a computer virus named Swayzak, and TOM is trapped in hyperspace. He manages to defeat Swayzak before the Absolution hits Earth. The game tie-in for this event is lost.

During the week of February 24–28, 2003, Cartoon Network aired on Toonami "Giant Robot Week," a five-day special based on mecha series, which were licensed by A.D. Vision. The series shown were Neon Genesis Evangelion, Gigantor, Robotech, Martian Successor Nadesico, and Dai-Guard.

==== 2003–07, 2012: T.O.M. 3 era ====
Logo used from March 17, 2003 to April 16, 2004

In March 2003, TOM was revamped into a more muscular figure. This was explained in-universe as him being rebuilt after fighting a space pirate named Orcelot Rex in the comic Endgame. His voice also became more humanlike.

In September 2003, a miniseries premiered introducing a new, 2D universe. Immortal Grand Prix (IGPX), created by Toonami producers Sean Akins and Jason DeMarco, and produced by anime studio Production I.G, aired in five short installments, serving as a pilot for the second Toonami original series, which premiered in November 2005.

Toonami logo from April 18, 2004 to March 10, 2007 and from its relaunch on April 1, 2012 to April 26, 2013

On April 17, 2004, Toonami was moved from weekday afternoons to a Saturday evening slot, where it aired regularly for four hours starting at 7:00 pm EST. A new lighter-toned action block, Miguzi, premiered two weekdays in its place. Toonami also replaced the block known as Saturday Video Entertainment System (SVES). The reason behind the changes were that the network thought Toonami's audience had gotten older than what was desired for weekday afternoon programming. The new Toonami lineup showcased anime such as Naruto, Rave Master, Duel Masters, Mobile Suit Gundam SEED, One Piece, Bobobo-bo Bo-bobo, Zatch Bell!, and Pokémon Chronicles, as well as premiered North American productions including Teen Titans, Megas XLR, The Batman, Justice League Unlimited, and IGPX, Toonami's first and only original production co-produced by Production I.G and Bandai Entertainment. SARA got a full body during this period, and became more anime-esque, along with her voice actress being changed to British actress and Red Dwarf star Samantha Robson.

In 2006, the block decided to celebrate their anniversary and Hayao Miyazaki's 65th birthday by having a four-week celebration called "A Month of Miyazaki" in which they aired a Studio Ghibli film each week. The parent company of Cartoon Network had already done so earlier in the year on a sister channel, Turner Classic Movies and wanted to repeat it again. The promotion also included original CG animation created for the block.

- March 18 – Spirited Away
- March 25 – Princess Mononoke
- April 1 – Castle in the Sky
- April 8 – Nausicaä of the Valley of the Wind

Although Megas XLR was the first original American-made franchise to actually debut on the block, it was initially a Cartoon Network original that was planned to air on Friday nights. Other Cartoon Network action properties, namely Samurai Jack, Teen Titans, and Justice League, aired on Toonami, but were not exclusive to the block until their final seasons.

==== 2007–08: T.O.M. 4 era and cancellation ====
Toonami logo used from March 17, 2007, to September 20, 2008, its initial shutdown

On January 27, 2007, a teaser commercial aired during the Xiaolin Showdown marathon on Cartoon Network, featuring closeup shots of larger Clydes (the remote robot explorers that have been a fixture of Toonami since the beginning) and two new robot A.I's along with the date "3/17/07" and T.O.M.'s chest emblem glowing blue. On March 17, Toonami celebrated its 10th anniversary with a new packaging and numerous montages celebrating the block. T.O.M. was revamped into a shorter robot with more humanoid facial features who was a commander of a jungle control room and aided by two new robots, Flash (Tom Kenny) and D (Dave Wittenberg). The montages included a look at past hosts, former logos, and a decade's worth of clips and voice-overs from shows that aired on Toonami. There were a total of four montages, each with different clips, and three were one minute long.

As part of the anniversary (and to coincide with Cartoon Network's March Movie Madness event), Toonami planned another month of movies:

- March 3 – The Invincible Iron Man
- March 10 – Mosaic
- March 17 – Hellboy: Blood and Iron
- March 24 – Stan Lee Presents: The Condor
- March 31 – Spirited Away and Teen Titans: Trouble in Tokyo

On September 20, 2008, at the Anime Weekend Atlanta convention in Atlanta, Georgia, Cartoon Network announced that they had cancelled the Toonami block due to low ratings. Toonami then aired its final broadcast later that same evening. The final show to air on the block was a rerun of Samurai Jack at 10:30 PM. Employees who worked on the block moved to other parts of the channel, except for Dennis Moloney, who left Turner to work for Disney. Toonami Jetstream remained with the Toonami name until January 30, 2009. At the end of Toonami's final airing, T.O.M. 4 ended the block with a brief, final monologue, backed by the song "Cascade" by Tycho:

Well, this is the end, beautiful friends. After more than 11 years, this is Toonami's final broadcast. It's been a lot of fun, and we'd like to thank each and every one of you who made this journey with us. Toonami wouldn't have been anything without you. Hopefully, we've left you with some good memories. So, until we meet again, stay gold. Bang.

After Toonami's final episode on TV, Toonami Jetstream's subsequent shutdown in 2009 marked the end of this incarnation until the brand's revival in 2012.

=== Adult Swim (2012–present) ===
==== 2012–13: T.O.M. 3.5 era ====
On April 1, 2012, Adult Swim aired the Toonami block for their annual April Fools' Day prank, in which would be the annual airing of The Room. After airing that week's scheduled episode of Bleach, the Toonami-related programming continued throughout the night, featuring shows such as Dragon Ball Z, Mobile Suit Gundam Wing, Tenchi Muyo!, Outlaw Star, The Big O, YuYu Hakusho, Blue Submarine No. 6, Trigun, Astro Boy (1963), and Gigantor. The following day, Adult Swim posted a message to their Twitter page, simply stating, "Want it back? Let us know. #BringBackToonami". On April 4, Adult Swim followed up this tweet with one stating, "#BringBackToonami We've heard you. Thank you for your passion and interest - stay tuned." On April 8, Adult Swim aired two bumpers about the Toonami tweets and answered with "[we're listening]" and "[we're looking into it]".

On May 16, Adult Swim posted a message on Facebook announcing that Toonami would return on May 26. The network issued a press release later that day confirming the block's revival as a Saturday late-night action block. Toonami made its return on May 26, with an initial lineup consisting of current Adult Swim Action programs, along with premieres of Deadman Wonderland and Casshern Sins. On August 18, Samurai 7 and Eureka Seven replaced Deadman Wonderland and Cowboy Bebop. In essence, the revived block is very similar to the Midnight Run of the original, airing uncut programming as well as having more mature themes.

On October 6, Toonami expanded to a full six hours; Sym-Bionic Titan and ThunderCats were added to the block. Tenchi Muyo! GXP was announced as the next premiere on November 3, as was the return of Inuyasha. On November 22, Toonami announced they would air uncut episodes of Naruto, and confirmed that Bleach would enter reruns for eight weeks, beginning on December 1.

On January 6, 2013, Toonami introduced a new blue color scheme, after using a similar scheme to introduce Inuyasha on November 3 of the previous year. New episodes of Bleach began on January 26. On February 16, Soul Eater began airing on Toonami, replacing Samurai 7. During MomoCon, new designs for both T.O.M and the Absolution were unveiled, along with the announcement that overall design of the block would be changed.

==== 2013–19: T.O.M. 5 era ====
Logo used from April 27, 2013 to March 30, 2014

On April 27, 2013, Toonami premiered its new look, featuring the return of supporting host SARA (now voiced by Adult Swim staff member Dana Swanson.) In December 2013, Toonami aired various films for the whole month similar to "A Month of Miyazaki" which aired years prior. The programming was called "Toonami Month of Movies". The first film included in the lineup was Akira, which marked the first R-rated film to be aired on Toonami. All of the films shown were new for the network.

- December 7 – Akira
- December 14 – Summer Wars
- December 21 – Fullmetal Alchemist: The Conqueror of Shamballa
- December 28 – Trigun: Badlands Rumble

To kick off 2014, Toonami premiered the anime Space Dandy on January 4, even before Japan. The anime ran for two seasons and 26 episodes before ending that September. The block introduced a new aesthetic on April 6. This new look also featured the return of the Ninja Tune record label to Toonami. In December 2014, Toonami celebrated a second "Toonami Month of Movies". This time, they aired two films each week instead of one. The airing not only included new, extended versions, and old films previously aired on Toonami but also the final episodes of Hellsing Ultimate.

- December 6 – Hellsing Ultimate: Hellsing IX and Summer Wars
- December 13 – Hellsing Ultimate: Hellsing X and Fullmetal Alchemist: The Sacred Star of Milos
- December 20 – Dragon Ball Z: Broly – The Legendary Super Saiyan and Akira
- December 27 – Evangelion: 1.11 You Are (Not) Alone and Evangelion: 2.22 You Can (Not) Advance

Logo used from April 5, 2014 to December 13, 2015

Intruder II, the first Total Immersion Event since Toonami's 2012 revival, began on November 7 and concluded on December 20, 2015, with Sonny Strait reprising his role as The Intruder with Steve Blum, who also is The Intruder and TOM 5. On December 2, 2015, Adult Swim announced that a new season of Samurai Jack was being produced. It ended up premiering on Toonami in March 2017. The conclusion of Intruder III in 2016 led to another new look to Toonami.

Logo used from December 20, 2015 to November 19, 2016

On December 31, 2016, Toonami aired its first subtitled anime broadcast with the music video of Porter Robinson and Madeon's "Shelter", produced in collaboration with A-1 Pictures and Crunchyroll. However, the subtitled parts in both the start and end of the music video have been removed due to an unknown error. As of right now, it is unknown that the full version of the music video could air in the future, besides being available on Crunchyroll and Robinson's YouTube channel.

A fifth T.I.E. titled Countdown was released from November 4 through November 25, 2017. It centers T.O.M. being sent into the future where SARA takes over the Vindication after passing through an unknown nebula while his future counterpart travels to the present to destroy the ship to prevent her from becoming evil. The event concluded with T.O.M. having scratches and minimal damage on his body.

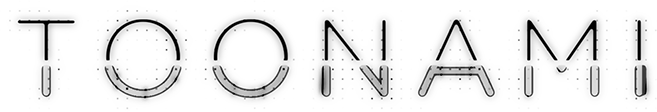
Logo used from November 26, 2016 to May 26, 2018

Logo used from June 2, 2018 to December 14, 2019

On March 20, 2018, Production I.G. and Adult Swim announced that two new seasons of FLCL, FLCL Progressive, and FLCL Alternative would premiere on Toonami in 2018, with the date set for June 2 at 11:30 pm. On April Fools' Day 2018, Toonami was entirely dubbed in Japanese and kicked the prank off by airing a preview of the first episode of FLCL Alternative in Japanese with English subtitles. The Toonami logo was also changed to Japanese (stylized as トゥナミ). Toonami followed the sneak preview by airing the film Mind Game and aired programming after that was originally scheduled after Black Clover, except Iron-Blooded Orphans, in original Japanese with English subtitles. The English dubbed version of all of the programs that have aired on that week, including a review of Nier Automata, except for the sneak preview of FLCL Alternative, as well as Mind Game and Scavengers, would air a week later. TOM was voiced by Masa Kanome, a Japanese stunt actor who had been in a Wolverine movie, and Sara was voiced by Fusako Shiotani. Sentai Studios was responsible for producing English subtitles for TOM and SARA's dialogue.

On September 29, Toonami expanded to seven full hours from 9 PM to 4 AM with Boruto: Naruto Next Generations as the marquee addition. On December 13, it was announced that Toonami would remove Dragon Ball Z Kai and Samurai Jack from its lineup, cutting the block down to 6 hours. Also, the block would be moved back and would air from 11 PM-5 AM, starting on January 5, 2019, because of Adult Swim taking back the 8 PM hour from Cartoon Network.

On January 24, it was announced that Toonami would remove Pop Team Epic and Iron-Blooded Orphans from its lineup, cutting the block down to 5 hours.

On May 13, 2019, Adult Swim announced that Toonami would be shifting its whole block thirty minutes earlier, starting at 10:30 PM and ending at 3:30 AM, cutting a half-hour rerun of Family Guy. The changes began on May 25, 2019.

On May 24, 2019, MomoCon announced that a new T.I.E., The Forge, would begin airing on November 9.

On June 27, 2019, it was announced that Toonami would be shifting its whole block back at 11:00 pm and ending at 4:00 am, in addition to premiering Food Wars!: Shokugeki no Soma at 1:00 am. The changes began on July 6, 2019. On July 4 at Anime Expo and on Facebook, it was announced that Demon Slayer: Kimetsu no Yaiba would be joining the block this Fall. On July 20, it was revealed that Fire Force would be joining the block at 1:00 AM. On July 7 at RTX 2019, it was announced that Gen:Lock would be joining the block on August 3. On August 16, it was announced that Toonami would expand 30 minutes and reshuffling its block with Dr. Stone at 12:00 AM.

==== 2019–present: T.O.M. 6 era ====
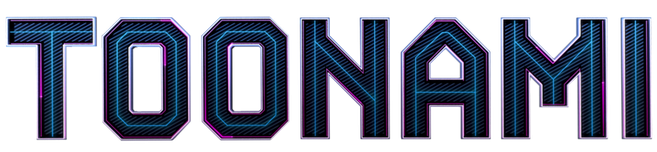
Logo used from December 21, 2019, to March 13, 2021

During the Total Immersion Event in November 2019, T.O.M. 5 was killed by the Forge Commander, in which T.O.M. called him "Booger", in episode 4 of The Forge. This signaled the ending of TOM 5's service as the host of Toonami's programming block, which began back in 2013. This iteration of T.O.M. was the longest running host in Toonami history. In episode 5, SARA revived TOM by using the Forge to create a new body, therefore, occurring the birth of T.O.M. 6.

On January 8, 2020, it was announced that Sword Art Online: Alicization – War of Underworld would premiere on the network on January 18. On January 23, it was announced that Toonami would be reducing the block to five hours, as Fire Force was ending its run; the new block aired from 11:00 PM to 4:00 AM. On February 6, it was announced that the block would lose another one and a half hours, as Dr. Stone was ending its run, while reruns of The Promised Neverland and Attack on Titan would also cease. This reduced the length of the block to three and a half hours, which aired from 11:30 PM to 3:00 AM. On April 8, it was announced that Toonami would be reduced to a three-hour block, as Sword Art Online: Alicization - War of Underworld was ending its run. On April 15, it was announced that Paranoia Agent would premiere on April 25 and that Food Wars: Shokugeki no Soma would be removed from the block until a new agreement was struck for the next season. On June 3, it was announced that the run of JoJo's Bizarre Adventure: Golden Wind would be put on hold due to dubbing production problems associated with the COVID-19 pandemic, with the Adult Swim original series Ballmastrz: 9009 temporarily replacing it on Toonami starting on June 6.

On July 26, it was announced that JoJo's Bizarre Adventure: Golden Wind would be returning on August 1, starting with episode 29. That same day, block runner Jason DeMarco tweeted that Toonami had six original projects in total in the works, including three that were unannounced at the time. On July 28, the second season of Fire Force was confirmed with an expected air date of October 24, however it was later rescheduled to November 7. On August 4, it was announced that Toonami: Dark Knights was confirmed for DC FanDome has 4 Batman movies in two weeks, including Batman: Year One, Batman: The Dark Knight Returns Part 1, Batman: Gotham Knight, and Batman: The Dark Knight Returns Part 2 with an expected air date of August 15, however it was later again on August 22. On August 22, it was announced that Assassination Classroom would premiere on August 29. On October 20, Toonami announced the return of Sword Art Online: Alicization - War of Underworld and premiere of Gēmusetto: Death Beat(s) on November 7, starting with episode 39. On November 16, it was announced that Primal was confirmed as the marathon on November 28 for the entire season. On December 11, it was announced again that Toonami Wonder Woman night was confirmed for DC FanDome has the entire regularly scheduled lineup was pre-empted by back-to-back movie presentations, including Wonder Woman: Bloodlines and Justice League: The New Frontier on December 19. On December 24, 2020, it was announced that SSSS.Gridman would premiere in January 2021. On December 28, 2020, it was announced that Toonami would be increasing the block back to four hours as Attack on Titan would return on January 9, 2021.

Logo from March 20, 2021, to March 19, 2022

On February 1, 2021, it was announced that Black Clover would be returning to February 13, starting with episode 137. On February 10, 2021, it was announced that Food Wars!: The Third Plate would be returning on February 27, to replace Assassination Classroom. On March 17, 2021, it was announced that The Promised Neverland would be returning as the season two premiere on April 10. On June 8, 2021, it was announced that Yashahime: Princess Half-Demon would premiere on June 26. On July 13, 2021, it was announced that Harley Quinn was confirmed as the marathon on August 7 for the entire season. However, the final episode of the season was not aired that night due to an unknown error. On November 10, 2021, it was announced that for one night only, Toonami would receive an extra night of programming on November 26, 2021. The lineup featured Shinichiro Watanabe's Blade Runner Black Out 2022 short, the live-action Blade Runner 2049 film, and the first three episodes of Blade Runner: Black Lotus. However, the block's on-air branding package was not used that night due to the runtime of the film.

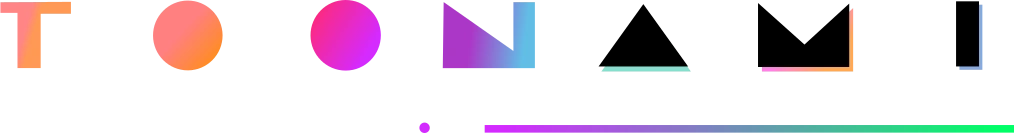
Logo from March 26, 2022, to July 19, 2025

On January 8, 2022, Toonami announced that they would be airing a new show every week "for the next month or so" beginning with the second season of Assassination Classroom. They later announced the arrival of Made in Abyss, return of One Piece, premiere date of Shenmue: The Animation, and arrival of the second part of the fourth season of Attack on Titan. On February 19, 2022, a second round of Cosmo Samurai episodes began premiering to celebrate the block's 25th anniversary, with Sentai Studios producing the English subtitles. On March 13, 2022, it was announced that a new T.I.E., The Return, would air in two parts to celebrate the block's 25th anniversary. Running for two minutes each, the event saw TOM 6 and SARA v4 going to the GPS Absolution Mk. XIV, an upgraded version of the Absolution that was sent back in time from 250 years in the future, for the next graphical rebrand, and the Forge is now abandoned. On March 17, 2022, a new original series, Housing Complex C, was announced for a 2022 release and two new seasons of FLCL for 2023. On April 7, 2022, it was announced that Lupin the 3rd Part 6 would premiere on the block, replacing Made in Abyss on April 16. On May 18, 2022, it was announced that an original anime series directed by Sunghoo Park, titled Ninja Kamui, would premiere on Toonami.

On March 29, 2023, during Adult Swim's initial press release for its expansion to 7:00 PM, it was announced that encore episodes of Unicorn: Warriors Eternal and My Adventures with Superman would run inside the block. On July 20, 2023, it was announced that a new original series directed by Shinichirō Watanabe and animated by MAPPA, titled Lazarus would premiere on the Toonami block. On October 28, 2023, it was announced that the Mugen Train Arc of Demon Slayer: Kimetsu no Yaiba would premiere on November 11 alongside cour 2 of Dr. Stone: New World and HD remastered episodes of IGPX by Discotek Media to promote their Blu-Ray release in 2024 on November 5, 18 years to the day the show originally first broadcast on the original Toonami block, as part of its DST bonus hour. (Note: IGPX was moved to November 12, 2023 due to the Toonami block ended pre-maturely at that time the previous week, with the first two episodes being aired commercial-free without the block's on-air branding package.) On November 17, 2023, it was announced at Anime NYC that the Demon Slayer: Kimetsu No Yaiba: Entertainment District Arc would air on January 13, 2024, while Aniplex of America also announced that Lycoris Recoil would debut the following week on January 20, 2024.

On March 16, 2024, Toonami ran a special 4-hour Dragon Ball Z Kai marathon from 2 to 6 AM in honor of the original manga author Akira Toriyama who died two weeks prior. The marathon included the first 8 episodes of the Saiyan Saga alongside an opening tribute from TOM and SARA. On May 17, 2024, it was announced that a new Friday afternoon block titled Toonami Rewind would begin airing on May 31 from 5 to 7 PM. Initial programming includes the 2014 Viz Media redub for Sailor Moon, Dragon Ball Z Kai and the original Naruto series. On August 17, 2024, Rick and Morty: The Anime was premiered on the block during the summer of 2024, with its English dub airing on Adult Swim, while the Toonami encores were shown in Japanese with English subtitles. On September 28, five years after it was announced, Uzumaki made its debut on the line-up. Like Rick and Morty: The Anime, the show also aired in Japanese with English subtitles on Toonami while its English dub aired on Adult Swim, but in a dissimilar fashion, the subbed episodes were the linear premiere episodes while the Thursday episodes on Adult Swim were dubbed encores of the premieres. On October 8, 2024, was announced that Invincible Fight Girl is making a premiere on Toonami on November 2. On October 18, 2024, it was announced at New York Comic Con that Mashle: Magic and Muscles would premiere on November 9 of the same year, along with the return of the Blue Exorcist rebroadcasting season 1, starting November 2. On December 14, 2024, Adult Swim announced that the Toonami Rewind program block would end at the end of the year and be replaced by a re-expansion of its Checkered Past block on January 3, 2025.

Some of the shows that recently aired on Toonami Rewind, such as Sailor Moon and Naruto, now carried over to Toonami on Saturday nights starting January 11 and 25, respectively. On February 27, it was announced that Lazarus would premiere on April 5 at midnight on the block and, hours later, on TV Tokyo in Japan. On April 11, 2025, it was announced that Toonami would broadcast a music video film titled Ginger Root's Shinbangumi on April 26, with Sailor Moon being pre-empted for one week due to the program. On April 25, 2025, it was announced that Bleach: Thousand-Year Blood War and Blue Exorcist: Kyoto Saga would debut on the block beginning on May 17, 2025. On June 5, 2025, it was announced that Dragon Ball Daima would be premiering on the block on June 14, 2025, at 12:30 AM. On July 11, 2025, it was announced that Dandadan would be premiering on the block on July 26 at 12:30 AM. On that day, a new Toonami logo debuted, with no tie-in T.I.E. On August 8, 2025, it was announced that Blue Exorcist: Shimane Illuminati Saga would premiere on the block beginning on August 23, 2025. On October 25, 2025, it was announced that Blue Exorcist: Beyond the Snow Saga and Mashle: Magic and Muscles - The Divine Visionary Candidate Exam Arc would premiere on the block beginning on November 8, 2025.

On January 9, 2026, it was announced Primal would rejoin the block on January 17 at midnight with encore airings of the third season, nearly a week after the initial premiere run on Adult Swim. On January 23, 2026, it was announced that Blue Lock and Tokyo Revengers would both premiere on the block on February 7, 2026. On February 4, 2026, it was announced that Rooster Fighter would premiere on the block on March 14, 2026, at midnight. On March 7, 2026, it was announced via an on-air promo that the second season of Dandadan would officially premiere on the block on March 28, 2026. This follows up on a sneak peek broadcast of its first episode while hosting a marathon of the first season back on December 28, 2025.

== Online video services ==
=== Toonami Reactor ===
On March 26, 2001, Cartoon Network launched Toonami Reactor, their first online streaming video service. The three-month service featured streaming episodes from Dragon Ball Z and Star Blazers, the latter of which was an online-exclusive series. Editorial content was provided by the now-defunct Animerica Magazine, published by Viz Media. After the three-month "trial run" was over, Cartoon Network took it offline and completely revamped it.

On November 14, 2001, Cartoon Network relaunched Toonami Reactor with all online-exclusive programs such as Star Blazers, Patlabor: The TV Series, Harlock Saga, and Record of Lodoss War, as well as videos from Daft Punk and Toonami-themed games. In the summer of 2002, Toonami Reactor was revamped again under the Adult Swim aegis and, in a joint venture with Viz's Weekly Shonen Jump, programmed it as "Adult Swim Pipeline." It featured episodes and/or manga chapters from One Piece, Naruto, Shaman King, YuYu Hakusho, and Sand Land.

=== Toonami Jetstream ===
On April 25, 2006, Cartoon Network and VIZ Media announced plans to launch Toonami Jetstream, a new ad-supported streaming video service featuring Toonami series like Naruto, Samurai Jack, Megas XLR, and IGPX, and the Internet webcast premieres of Hikaru no Go, MÄR, Eyeshield 21, The Prince of Tennis, MegaMan Star Force, Kiba, MegaMan NT Warrior, and Zoids: Genesis, the latter two of which were never streamed.

Toonami Jetstream launched on July 17, 2006 (after a brief unofficial sneak preview that began on July 14), and offered episodes of Naruto, Hikaru no Go, MÄR, Zatch Bell!, Pokémon, Blue Dragon, Samurai Jack, Kiba, Storm Hawks and Transformers: Animated.

On January 31, 2009, Toonami Jetstream was discontinued. Since then, many of the shows aired until cancellation aired on Cartoon Network Video on its main website.

In 2012, Adult Swim rebranded their action videos section as "Toonami shows". It initially featured content from Durarara!!, which never aired on the Toonami block but was still available in Adult Swim's syndication library due its airing from the previous year.

=== Toonami: Pre-Flight ===
On February 27, 2015, adultswim.com launched the online show Toonami: Pre-Flight hosted by Toonami producers Jason DeMarco and Gill Austin. The first two episodes premiered on a Friday at 5:00 p.m. Eastern time, and was then moved to Tuesday at 5:00 p.m. Eastern time until September 25, 2015, when the show was moved back to Fridays at 6:30 p.m. Eastern time. Each episode features a series highlight, a weekly topic and other featurettes like sneak peeks at promos and spots, as well as announcements, and segments from voiceover talent Steve Blum and Dana Swanson. Toonami has also done panels from MomoCon, San Diego Comic-Con, Dragon Con, and Anime Expo which they've streamed as part of Pre-Flight either live or on tape delay. On November 14, 2020, Toonami: Pre-Flight aired its final episode.

=== Crunchyroll ===
The anime-oriented streaming service company Crunchyroll became a sibling asset to Adult Swim after AT&T's acquisition of Time Warner, and its subsequent acquisition of the remaining shares in AT&T's existing venture Otter Media. In March 2019, Adult Swim and Otter were briefly placed under Warner Bros. as part of a corporate reorganization. The corresponding announcement stated that there would be synergies between Toonami and the service; the two properties had already announced a collaboration on Blade Runner: Black Lotus, an anime series set within the Blade Runner universe. In July 2020, Adult Swim and Crunchyroll announced a new anime series collaboration, titled Fena: Pirate Princess. At the virtual Crunchyroll Expo in September 2020, the two entities announced yet another collaboration titled Shenmue: The Animation, an anime series based on the video game series by Sega. The collaboration between Toonami and Crunchyroll was ended after Sony Pictures Entertainment / Aniplex acquired Crunchyroll in 2021.

== Current schedule ==
All times shown for each slot are Eastern.

Effective as of the broadcast night of October 17, 2026:

Time	12:00 a.m.	12:30 a.m.	1:00 a.m.	1:30 a.m.	2:00 a.m.	2:30 a.m.	3:00 a.m.	3:30 a.m.
Series	Get Jiro*	Wind Breaker*	Gachiakuta*	One Piece*	IGPX (HD*)	Lazarus (English dub)	Blue Exorcist: Kyoto Saga	Get Jiro

* – Indicates first-run episode premiere for the block

== Programming ==
- **Bold text** indicates shows that had any form of world premiere on the block, excluding English dub-only premieres.

=== Cartoon Network (1997–2008) / Kids' WB (2001–02) ===
1997

- ThunderCats (1985 TV series)
- Cartoon Roulette (Composed of Space Ghost, Birdman and the Galaxy Trio, The Herculoids, Mightor, Shazzan, Teen Force, The Impossibles, and the 1940s Superman cartoons)
- Voltron
- The Real Adventures of Jonny Quest

1998

- Robotech
- Beast Wars: Transformers
- Sailor Moon (DIC / Cloverway dub)
- Dragon Ball Z (Ocean / Funimation dub)
- Super Friends

1999

- ReBoot
- The Powerpuff Girls
- Ronin Warriors

2000

- G-Force: Guardians of Space
- Mobile Suit Gundam Wing
- Batman: The Animated Series
- Tenchi Muyo!
- Tenchi Universe
- Tenchi in Tokyo
- Blue Submarine No. 6
- Superman: The Animated Series

2001

- Outlaw Star
- The Big O
- Cardcaptors
- Mobile Suit Gundam
- Mobile Suit Gundam: The 08th MS Team
- Dragon Ball
- Batman Beyond
- Zoids: New Century
- Mobile Suit Gundam 0080: War in the Pocket

2002

- Hamtaro
- Zoids: Chaotic Century
- Mobile Fighter G Gundam
- **He-Man and the Masters of the Universe**
- **Transformers: Armada**
- G.I. Joe
- Samurai Jack

2003

- .hack//Sign
- YuYu Hakusho
- Rurouni Kenshin
- Justice League
- Cyborg 009: The Cyborg Soldier
- **Superior Defender Gundam Force**
- Dragon Ball GT
- Star Wars: Clone Wars

2004

- **Duel Masters**
- Astro Boy
- Transformers: Energon
- Jackie Chan Adventures
- Mobile Suit Gundam SEED
- **Megas XLR**
- Rave Master
- **Teen Titans**
- **Justice League Unlimited**

2005

- **D.I.C.E.**
- Zatch Bell!
- The Batman
- One Piece
- Transformers: Cybertron
- Yu-Gi-Oh!
- Naruto
- Bobobo-bo Bo-bobo
- Dragon Ball Z (Uncut)
- **IGPX: Immortal Grand Prix** (TV series)

2006

- Wulin Warriors
- Pokémon Chronicles
- Fantastic Four: World's Greatest Heroes
- Pokémon: Battle Frontier
- Yu-Gi-Oh! GX
- MÄR
- The Prince of Tennis

2007

- Mega Man Star Force
- Storm Hawks

2008

- Bakugan Battle Brawlers
- Blue Dragon
- Ben 10: Alien Force

=== Adult Swim (2012–present) ===
2012

- Bleach
- Deadman Wonderland
- Casshern Sins
- Fullmetal Alchemist: Brotherhood
- Ghost in the Shell: S.A.C. 2nd GIG
- Cowboy Bebop
- Ghost in the Shell: Stand Alone Complex
- Samurai 7
- Eureka Seven
- Sym-Bionic Titan
- ThunderCats (2011 TV series)
- Inuyasha
- Tenchi Muyo! GXP
- Naruto (Uncut)

2013

- Soul Eater
- IGPX: Immortal Grand Prix (TV series)
- One Piece (Uncut)
- Sword Art Online
- The Big O II
- Star Wars: The Clone Wars
- FLCL

2014

- **Space Dandy**
- Naruto: Shippuden
- Samurai Jack (Original series)
- Blue Exorcist
- Black Lagoon
- Attack on Titan
- Beware the Batman
- Gurren Lagann
- Hellsing Ultimate
- Dragon Ball Z Kai
- Inuyasha: The Final Act

2015

- Kill la Kill
- Sword Art Online II
- Michiko & Hatchin
- Akame ga Kill!
- Parasyte -the maxim-

2016

- Samurai Champloo
- Dimension W
- Hunter × Hunter (2011 TV series)
- Mobile Suit Gundam: Iron-Blooded Orphans
- One-Punch Man
- JoJo's Bizarre Adventure: The Animation

2017

- Dragon Ball Super
- Dragon Ball Z Kai: The Final Chapters
- Mobile Suit Gundam Unicorn RE:0096
- **Samurai Jack** (Season 5)
- Tokyo Ghoul
- Lupin the 3rd Part IV: The Italian Adventure
- JoJo's Bizarre Adventure: Stardust Crusaders
- Outlaw Star (HD)
- Black Clover

2018

- My Hero Academia
- **FLCL Progressive**
- Pop Team Epic
- JoJo's Bizarre Adventure: Diamond Is Unbreakable
- **FLCL Alternative**
- Boruto: Naruto Next Generations
- Mob Psycho 100
- Megalobox

2019

- Sword Art Online: Alicization
- The Promised Neverland
- Lupin the 3rd Part V: Misadventures in France
- Food Wars!: Shokugeki no Soma
- Mobile Suit Gundam: The Origin – Advent of the Red Comet
- Fire Force
- Gen:Lock
- Dr. Stone
- Demon Slayer: Kimetsu no Yaiba
- JoJo's Bizarre Adventure: Golden Wind

2020

- Sword Art Online: Alicization – War of Underworld
- Paranoia Agent
- Ballmastrz: 9009
- Assassination Classroom
- **Gēmusetto: Death Beat(s)**
- Primal

2021

- SSSS.Gridman
- Yashahime: Princess Half-Demon
- Harley Quinn
- **Fena: Pirate Princess**
- **Blade Runner: Black Lotus**

2022

- Made in Abyss
- **Shenmue: The Animation**
- Lupin the 3rd Part 6
- **Housing Complex C**

2023

- Unicorn: Warriors Eternal
- **My Adventures with Superman**
- **FLCL: Grunge**
- **FLCL: Shoegaze**

2024

- Lycoris Recoil
- **Ninja Kamui**
- Zom 100: Bucket List of the Dead
- Sailor Moon (Viz Media dub)
- Rick and Morty: The Anime
- **Uzumaki**
- **Invincible Fight Girl**
- Mashle: Magic and Muscles

2025

- Common Side Effects
- **Lazarus**
- Bleach: Thousand-Year Blood War
- Dragon Ball Daima
- Dandadan

2026

- Blue Lock
- Tokyo Revengers
- **Rooster Fighter**
- Scavengers Reign
- **Get Jiro**
- Wind Breaker
- Gachiakuta

== Video game reviews ==
Throughout its history, Toonami has aired brief reviews of video games during commercial breaks. The reviews are primarily written by Jason DeMarco and based on his own experiences with the games. Transcripts of the reviews could also be found on Toonami's website, including for games that did not have a corresponding video such as Batman: Dark Tomorrow, Super Smash Bros. Ultimate, Halo 5: Guardians, The Matrix Online, Harry Potter: Quidditch World Cup, Animal Crossing: Wild World, Mega Man Battle Network, Samurai Jack: The Amulet of Time, The Powerpuff Girls: Relish Rampage, Costume Quest 2, The Legend of Zelda: Breath of the Wild, Cartoon Network: Battle Crashers, Spider-Man: Battle for New York, Killer Instinct, Doom Eternal, Shovel Knight, Samurai Jack: Battle Through Time, Rise of the Tomb Raider, Call of Duty: Black Ops III, Need for Speed: Carbon, Resident Evil 7: Biohazard, Injustice: Gods Among Us, Spyro: A Hero's Tail, Splashdown: Rides Gone Wild, Doom 3: Resurrection of Evil, Far Cry 5, Guitar Hero, Gran Turismo 6, Cartoon Network: Block Party, Cartoon Network Racing, Cartoon Network Speedway, Middle-Earth: Shadow of Mordor, Need for Speed: Underground 2, Need for Speed Rivals, Street Fighter V, Ben 10: Protector of Earth, Samurai Jack: The Shadow of Aku, Steven Universe: Save the Light, Teenage Mutant Ninja Turtles: Shredder's Revenge, Codename: Kids Next Door – Operation: V.I.D.E.O.G.A.M.E., Cartoon Network Universe: FusionFall Heroes, The Lego Ninjago Movie Video Game, Indiana Jones and the Emperor's Tomb, Cuphead, Cookie Run: Kingdom, X-Men Legends II: Rise of Apocalypse, Star Wars Trilogy: Apprentice of the Force, Spider-Man 2, Reigns: Game of Thrones, Medal of Honor, Perfect Dark, Front Mission 3, Grandia, and Sonic the Hedgehog. The rating system for games was originally 1–5, until it was increased to a 1-10 scaled in 2000. Beginning in March 2021, games also receive three additional individual ratings for graphics, sound, and gameplay.

Seven games have received ratings not based on the 1-10 scale. Dropship: United Peace Force was given a "?" rating, because TOM could not get past the sixth level. Similarly, Slender: The Eight Pages also received a "?" rating, because TOM was too frightened to continue playing. Assassin's Creed IV: Black Flag was given an "ARRRRRR!" rating to reflect on the game's pirate theme. Assassin's Creed: Valhalla received "a barbaric yawp". 198X received an "Incomplete 7/10" due to the game's short length and hints of a sequel. Ninja Kamui: Shinobi Origins received a "N/A" rating due to being not released at the time of the review. It was also mentioned that it is available for pre-order.

== International ==
Outside the United States, Cartoon Network aired Toonami blocks in most countries in the 2000s, such as in Australia from 2001 to 2006. Toonami was operated as a standalone channel in the United Kingdom from 2003 to 2007, in Asia-Pacific from Christmas 2012 to 2018 and in India from 2015 to 2018. Other channel variants were launched in France in 2016 and twice in Africa; once in 2017 and then re-established in 2020.

=== Australia ===
The programming block was launched in 2001 in Australia as a weekend block on Cartoon Network. It aired on Saturday from 6:00 pm to 8:00 pm and on Sunday from 3:00 pm to 5:00 pm with a repeat on both nights from 11:00 pm to 1:00 am. The programming was then converted to a weekday block shortly thereafter. The programming was dropped from the channel in August 2006.

=== Canada ===
Although the block does not air on Adult Swim, owned by Corus Entertainment, some of its programming on the Toonami block airs on that channel. Historically, anime has been aired on Adult Swim's sister channel YTV from 2004–2010. Through YTV's block, Bionix, it aired anime in Canada such as .hack//Sign, Bleach, Blue Dragon, Case Closed, Death Note, Eureka Seven, Fullmetal Alchemist, Ghost in the Shell: Stand Alone Complex, Inuyasha, MÄR, Mobile Suit Gundam SEED, Mobile Suit Gundam SEED Destiny, Naruto, Witch Hunter Robin, Zatch Bell!, Dragon Ball, Dragon Ball Z, Sailor Moon, Dragon Ball GT.

=== France ===
Toonami was a programming block on Cartoon Network starting from January 2002.

A French version of the Toonami television channel was launched on February 11, 2016. It was operated by Turner Broadcasting System France, in France, and other French-speaking territories in Switzerland, Morocco, Belgium, Africa, Madagascar and Mauritius. It was later rebranded to Warner TV Next on September 4, 2023.

=== India ===
An Indian version of Toonami was first launched as a block in 2001 and was then followed by a stand-alone channel in 2015. It ceased operations on May 15, 2018.

=== Japan ===
The Japanese version of Toonami was first launched as a programming block for Cartoon Network Japan on July 22, 2002. In contrast to its American and international counterparts, the Japanese version of Toonami aired North American action cartoons instead of anime. It ceased operations in 2008.

=== Latin America ===
On December 2, 2002, Cartoon Network premiered the Toonami block, replacing a similarly themed block, Talisman. The weekend block of Toonami was then replaced by the premiere of Adult Swim in Latin America on October 7, 2005. In 2007, Cartoon Network cut the Toonami block completely from the channel.

In its substitution, in January 2010 a very similar block was created, which was known as Animaction, and it was broadcast on Wednesdays at midnight. This block aired both action and anime programming before being phased out in April 2011.

Toonami was revived on Cartoon Network in partnership with Crunchyroll beginning on August 31, 2020. The revived Toonami block runs every weeknight from 12 a.m. to 1 a.m. local time. The block aired for the last time on August 30, 2022, as the partnership has expired after 2 years.

On April 11, 2022, Warner TV premiered a new programming block similar to Toonami, which is known as Wanimé.

On August 22, 2023, it was announced that the block would return again as part of a new 24-hour Adult Swim channel. It was originally set to debut on October 31 of the same year, although that did not happen and instead the channel began airing a similar block akin to Adult Swim Action, the predecessor block of the current Toonami in United States.

=== Pakistan ===
Toonami was launched as a programming block on Cartoon Network in Pakistan and ran from 2004 to 2013.

=== Poland and Central Europe ===
Toonami was launched as a programming block on Cartoon Network in 2002 on CEE feed. It was aired mostly on weeknights from 8pm to 9pm and from 1pm to 2pm on weekends. Broadcasting hours were changed many times. CEE Toonami offered American action cartoons, as well as anime. It was closed in 2006.

=== Southeast Asia ===
A stand-alone Toonami channel was launched in Southeast Asia replacing Boomerang on December 1, 2012. Although it replaced Boomerang, the channel was relaunched in 2015 alongside Toonami. The channel shut down on March 31, 2018, making it the longest running stand alone channel of all of them, lasting six years.

=== Sub-Saharan Africa ===
Toonami first launched in sub-Saharan Africa on the Kwesé satellite television platform on June 1, 2017, but was removed on November 1, 2018, following Kwesé's closure.

Toonami was relaunched a second time on March 27, 2020, as a 6-week pop-up channel on DStv and GOtv. Toonami also launched on StarTimes, but as a permanent 24/7 channel on, channel 306 on satellite on 355 on DTT, on May 27, 2020. It was launched in South Africa in November 2020 on TelkomONE, but it was moved to the new launch of SABC+ on November 17, 2022.

=== UK & Ireland ===
Toonami was launched as a programming block on Cartoon Network in the UK and Ireland in 2001. In October 2002, it then became part of CNX, a new spin-off channel. Almost a year later, CNX was relaunched as Toonami in 2003 turning the block into a stand-alone channel. The channel shut down on May 24, 2007, replaced by a 24-hour Cartoon Network Too.
