= FLCL Alternative =

- Season 3
- Cover for the Blu-ray release of FLCL Alternative in Japan
- No. of episodes: 6

Release
- Original network: Adult Swim
- Original release: September 8 (Note: The first episode of FLCL Alternative premiered unannounced in Japanese audio with English subtitles on April 1, 2018 at midnight ET as part of Adult Swim's April Fools' stunt. The date reflects the proper first run broadcast of the series.) – October 13, 2018

Season chronology
- ← Previous; Season 2: Progressive Next → Season 4: Grunge

The third season of the FLCL anime series, titled FLCL Alternative, (Note: Also typed as FLCL: Alternative, with the colon being used on an inconsistent basis since the announcement of 2 new seasons in March 2022.) is produced by Production I.G, Toho, and Adult Swim's production arm Williams Street. Alternative was chief directed by Katsuyuki Motohiro and co-directed by Yutaka Uemura, with screenplay by Hideto Iwai. It originally aired from September 8 to October 13, 2018, in the United States on Adult Swim's Toonami programming block. However, the first episode of the season aired unannounced in Japanese audio with English subtitles as part of Adult Swim's April Fools' stunt back on April 1, 2018. In Japan, Alternative received a theatrical screening as a compilation film, with it opening on September 7, 2018. In addition to providing several tracks for the season, the Pillows performed the ending theme song "Star overhead".

In this season, Haruko enters into the life of high school student Kana Koumoto and her friends as she becomes a mentor of sorts to Kana in helping the teen's transition into adulthood as Medical Mechanica begins its assault on Earth.

== Episodes ==
No. overall	No. in season	Title	Animated by	Directed by	Written by	Storyboarded by	Original release date
13	1	"Flying Memory"; Transliteration: "Fura Memo" (Japanese: フラメモ)	NUT	Yutaka Uemura	Hideto Iwai	Yutaka Uemura, Hiromi Taniguchi	April 1, 2018 (April Fools, Japanese) September 8, 2018 (English)
Kana Koumoto heads to her high school and meets up with her friends: "Pets," Hijiri, and "Mossan." When their class is instructed to fill out surveys for their potential careers after graduation, Kana admits to the group she has no clue what she wants to do. While at her after-school job at a ramen shop, Kana meets a couple of odd customers: a man named Tsukata Kanda who bravely downs his ramen in one gulp despite accidentally spilling a ton of spice into his bowl, and strange pink-haired woman staring at Kana while eliciting a fearful reaction from Kanda. Kana meets with her friends the next day, their discussion about the news of potentially restricted space travel inspiring Mossan to convince the others they should start building a large bottle rocket out of discarded Dr Pepper bottles. The next day, they take a shopping trip to decorate their new bottle rocket, with Kana remarking that the shops are surprisingly uncrowded ever since a large mall went up in the middle of town and sucked away all the customers. Finally, the girls finish decorating their bottle rocket, when a large pin crashes through the roof of the house and somehow possesses a humanoid model in the house and turns it into a giant monster. The strange woman from before, Haruhara Haruko, suddenly appears and kicks Kana in the head before fighting the monster on her own. As Kana's friends try to revive her, a strange, glowing four-leaf clover grows out of Kana's forehead. Haruko then yanks the object out of Kana to reveal a guitar, and uses it to destroy the beast. After the incident, Haruko convinces Kana to rebuild the bottle rocket, which she does with her friends as they launch it at the beach days later. Tsukata Kanda, revealed to be a member of Department of Interstellar Immigration, later confronts Haruko over her appearance on Earth.
14	2	"Grown-Up Wannabe"; Transliteration: "Tonaburi" (Japanese: トナブリ)	Revoroot	Yutaka Uemura	Hideto Iwai	Kiyotaka Suzuki	September 15, 2018
Hijiri is driven to school in a yellow car after a photo shoot, kissing a college-aged photographer as her friends watch from afar. The rumors about her new boyfriend spread to her highschool, where the boys in class beg her to date one of them instead. Hijiri turns them all down, brushing off their pleas. While Kana tries to look more mature, Hijiri offers to take them with her on her next shoot over the weekend. The photographer, Toshio Shioya, takes some pictures of the girls at the park, but then becomes infatuated after watching Haruko while she works in a kebab truck. Hijiri drags Toshio away while the girls enjoy their lunch, but Toshio breaks up with Hijiri. Later that night, Kana keeps hearing various people talk about growing up, from Tsukata trying again to consume his ramen with a large amount of spice, to her brother talking about his new girlfriend. The next day, Hijiri appears colder and more irritable, even lashing out at her friends while they sing karaoke. While Kana tries to figure out the cause, she spots Haruko in the same car with Toshio. Kana decides to gather Pets and Mossan to confront Toshio in the mall parking lot, but are confused when Toshio asks for a necklace as Hijiri appears. Kana refuses to accept that Toshio broke up with Hijiri. Suddenly, Toshio's car begins transforming into a mech while horns are growing out of Kana's head during her rant. Haruko escapes the car before it transforms and hits Kana in the head with her guitar, drawing out the kebab truck from earlier. Letting Kana steer the truck, Haruko tries to destroy the bipedal car mech. During the fight, Toshiro tries to take pictures, but is nearly crushed by a falling pole. Hijiri risks her life to save Toshio, but is disappointed to see Toshio more concerned about the loss of his camera. Haruko finally manages to destroy the mech with a large kebab skewer. Afterwards, Toshio tries to selfishly restart his relationship with Hijiri, but she declines, realizing she was equally selfish by dating him to improve her own image. Toshio tries to protest, when Haruko smashes his head with her guitar, only to draw out a tiny version of his car. Haruko then gives the girls a free round of sandwiches before leaving in her truck.
15	3	"Freestyle Collection"; Transliteration: "Furikore" (Japanese: フリコレ)	Revoroot	Yutaka Uemura	Hideto Iwai	Nobukage Kimura	September 22, 2018
At school, Kana is reminded by her teacher to turn in her college planning sheet, much to her dismay. However, she realizes Mossan has already turned hers in, and she reveals she dreams of becoming a fashion designer, having already qualified in a design contest. Meanwhile, the government denies rumors that a rocket launch base off the coast is secretly being prepared to evacuate government officials from Earth. At the soba shop, Kana, Pets, and Hijiri are still uncertain about what to do, and Hijiri points out that Mossan is the most motivated and hardest working out of all of them. However, Mossan suffers a sudden eating fit due to stress from her part-time construction job, prompting the girls to take her to the school nurse, who turns out to be Haruko. After inspecting all the girls, Haruko concludes Mossan is overworked and overeating. The girls find out from Mossan's mother that Mossan is working so hard in order to earn the tuition for fashion design school. The girls also take up part-time construction jobs to help Mossan, but this only angers her, as she feels her dream won't be worth anything if she can't achieve it herself. Mossan's outburst leaves Kana depressed uncertain about her own future, but she is cheered up by a rap song from Haruko. Kana approaches Mossan again and convinces her to let her help her for the contest as an assistant. They manage to finish the dress in time for the contest, but Mossan does not end up being the winner. Regardless, Haruko crashes the contest and appears on stage wearing Mossan's dress, stunning the audience. After Haruko evades security, Mossan takes pride in her work and declares she'll become the world's next top model.
16	4	"Pit-a-Pat"; Transliteration: "Pitapato" (Japanese: ピタパト)	NUT	Yutaka Uemura	Hideto Iwai	Jun Shishido, Hiromi Taniguchi, Yutaka Uemura	September 29, 2018
Kanda continues to monitor the pins appearing all over the planet, knowing that they are a part of Medical Mechanica's latest plan. Kana arrives at school to see Haruko, now the school's new basketball coach, flirting with fellow student Sasaki, who Kana has a crush on. Kana immediately becomes jealous of the affection Haruko is showing to Sasaki and grows increasingly frustrated as she is both jealous yet denies her feelings for Sasaki. The Prime Minister secretly meets with Kanda, who warns her that Medical Mechanica may start its plan to flatten the Earth in four weeks. It is also revealed that Kanda was one of the many men Haruko seduced and later dumped in the past. Sasaki meets Kana in the park to assure her he doesn't have feelings for Haruko. Kana can't bring herself to confess her feelings to Sasaki, and the stress triggers a headache and she flees. The next day, Kana confides to her friends that Sasaki suffers from a rare nerve condition that prevents him from playing basketball, and as a child that got sick often, she found herself relating closely to his situation. Haruko then arrives and taunts Kana that she's too immature to have a relationship with Sasaki. Kana meets privately with Sasaki and almost kiss, but Kana realizes she's suddenly lost her passion. Suddenly, a robotic basketball player appears and eats Sasaki. Haruko engages in a basketball match against the robot and destroys it, releasing Sasaki. Later, Kana admits to Sasaki that she isn't ready for a relationship yet, and reflects that Haruko was correct in that she is still too immature for love. That night, the outer skin of the mall is blown away to reveal a Medical Mechanica plant.
17	5	"Shake It Off"; Transliteration: "Furisute" (Japanese: フリステ)	Revoroot	Yutaka Uemura	Hideto Iwai	Keisuke Kojima	October 6, 2018
Sudden global warming and the appearance of Medical Mechanica plants around the world begin to stoke concerns that the Earth will become extinct. The Prime Minister suspects that Medical Mechanica's movements are due to Haruko's presence on Earth, and she orders Kanda to deal with her. Meanwhile, Kana and her friends spend the day in the school pool, but Pets disappears. A classmate deduces that since Pets' father is an important government official, she will be taken to Mars as part of the government's migration plan to escape Earth's destruction. Kanda confronts Haruko and prevents her from attempting to destroy the Medical Mechanica plant, pointing how it is useless to resist Medical Mechanica. Kana is picked up by Pets' mother, who tells her that Pets has apparently run away from home. Kana realizes that Pets' home life has been extremely difficult due to her domineering father and she flees and is subsequently picked up by Haruko. Pets returns to the ruined community center, where she runs into the first machine that appeared. It reactivates and transforms into the Terminal Core, swallowing up Pets in the process as it advances towards the Medical Mechanica plant. Haruko engages the Terminal Core while Kana tries to free Pets. Kanda also arrives with the army to try and slow down the Terminal Core. Kana continues to try and free Pets, but Pets reveals that she never liked Kana and doesn't know why she was friends with her in the first place, considering all her actions to help others being selfish to soothe her own ego. Kana is shocked by these words, but her desire to save Pets regardless triggers her N.O. channel, sucking up the Terminal Core before falling to the ground. Unconscious, Kana has a dream that she's reunited with her friends and Pets decided not to go to Mars. In reality, Pets silently trades her and Kana's hair pins and walks off, leaving Kana behind.
18	6	"Full Flat"; Transliteration: "Furufura" (Japanese: フルフラ)	NUT	Yutaka Uemura	Hideto Iwai	Toshiro Fujii	October 13, 2018
Haruko destroys a dark Canti-like robot as she tries to break into the Medical Mechanica plant, but another Terminal Core arrives and activates the plant. All over the world, Medical Mechanica plants begin activating and Kanda estimates that they will begin flattening the Earth in less than two days. Meanwhile, Kana remains depressed at Pets leaving her. She goes back to work at the soba shop, where she meets Kanda again. She vents her frustration at how she wants to keep things the same as they used to be. Leaving work, she runs into Hijiri and Mossan. The next day, they ditch school and head for the beach, which is the closest they can get to the island space launch base where they say their goodbyes to Pets. Haruko then arrives and picks them up, telling them that she and Kanda have come up with a plan to stop Medical Mechanica as the plants begin to start moving. Kanda tells Kana that only her N.O. channel can stop the plants, and that she must accept that things change. An army of dark Cantis arrive and attack, forcing Haruko, Kanda, Hijiri, and Mossan to fight them off. Kana loudly declares that she loves everybody and admits that she knew things would change but stayed in denial, and that she had a deep seated fear of what others thought of her, which was why she always acted so selfishly to try to appeal to them. She also voices her desire to apologize to Pets and loudly declares her love for her. This triggers a massive N.O. reaction that sucks away the Terminal Core and Medical Mechanica plant and pulls Mars adjacent to Earth. Haruko ends up being sucked into the portal as well and ends up on Mars. Afterwards, life returns to normal, with Kana continuing to live on with Hijiri and Mossan while wearing Pets' hairpin.

== Home media release ==
=== Japanese ===
Toho Animation (Japan – Region 2/A)
Title	Disc	Runtime	Release date	Ref.
FLCL Alternative: The Movie	Blu-ray	135 minutes	October 31, 2018	

=== English ===
Warner Bros. Television (North America – Region 1/A)
Edition	Disc	Episodes	Release date	Ref.
Alternative: Complete Series	DVD	1–6	February 4, 2020	
FLCL 2 Series Collection	Blu-ray	1–6	February 4, 2020	
