= Phoenix World Tour =

2019–21 concert tour by Rita Ora

- Tour by Rita Ora
- Promotional poster for the UK part of the tour
- Location: Asia; Europe; North America; Oceania
- Associated album: Phoenix
- Start date: 1 March 2019
- End date: 6 March 2021
- No. of shows: 51

Rita Ora concert chronology
- The Girls Tour (2018); Phoenix World Tour (2019)

Phoenix World Tour was the fourth concert tour by British singer Rita Ora, in support of her second studio album, Phoenix (2018). The tour began on 1 March 2019 in Melbourne, Australia.

== Background ==
On 29 October 2018, Ora announced tour dates across Europe, Asia and Oceania from 1 March until 29 May 2019. Access to pre-sale tickets of the tour in Europe, which took place on 31 October 2018, was made available through album pre-order. Tickets went on sale to the general public two days later, on 2 November.

This was Ora's first solo tour in Asia and Australia, and her first arena tour in the United Kingdom. Additional tour dates and music festivals appearances were announced later on.

All the scheduled tour events in 2020 were either postponed or cancelled due to the COVID-19 pandemic.

== Set list ==
This set list is representative of the concert on 1 March 2019, in Melbourne, Australia. It is not representative of all concerts for the duration of the tour.

1. "For You"
2. "Your Song"
3. "Doing It"
4. "Let You Love Me"
5. "Summer Love"
6. "New Look"
7. "Girls"
8. "Only Want You"
9. "Hell of a Life"
10. "Soul Survivor"
11. "How Soon Is Now?"
12. "I Will Never Let You Down"
13. "R.I.P."
14. "Keep Talking"
15. "Black Widow"
16. "Hot Right Now"
17. "Coming Home"

Encore

18. "Lonely Together"
19. "Anywhere"

== Tour dates ==
List of concerts, showing date, city, country, venue and opening acts
Date	City	Country	Venue	Opening act(s)
Oceania
1 March 2019	Melbourne	Australia	Palais Theatre	Sammi Constantine
2 March 2019	Sydney	Australia	Big Top Auditorium	Sammi Constantine
5 March 2019	Brisbane	Australia	Eatons Hill	Sammi Constantine; Kim Petras
7 March 2019	Perth	Australia	Metro City	Sammi Constantine
Asia
10 March 2019	Manila	Philippines	New Frontier Theater	4th Impact
14 March 2019	Tokyo	Japan	Zepp DiverCity	—N/a
15 March 2019	Osaka	Japan	Zepp Namba	—N/a
16 March 2019	Taipei	Taiwan	Legacy Taipei	—N/a
23 March 2019 (Note: The concert on 23 March 2019 in Al Sufouh was part of The Assembly: Global Teacher Prize Concert.)	Al Sufouh	United Arab Emirates	Media City Amphitheatre	—N/a
North America
30 March 2019	Dallas	United States	The Statler Ballroom	—N/a
Europe
23 April 2019	Oslo	Norway	Sentrum Scene	Moss Kena
24 April 2019	Stockholm	Sweden	Berns	Moss Kena
26 April 2019	Cologne	Germany	Palladium	Moss Kena
27 April 2019	Munich	Germany	Zenith	Moss Kena
29 April 2019	Zürich	Switzerland	Halle 622	Moss Kena
30 April 2019	Milan	Italy	Fabrique	Moss Kena
2 May 2019	Paris	France	Bataclan	Moss Kena
3 May 2019	Utrecht	Netherlands	TivoliVredenburg	Moss Kena
21 May 2019	Cardiff	Wales	Motorpoint Arena	Moss Kena; Four of Diamonds
22 May 2019	Bournemouth	England	International Centre	Moss Kena; Four of Diamonds
24 May 2019	London	England	The O_{2} Arena	Moss Kena; Four of Diamonds
25 May 2019	Birmingham	England	Arena Birmingham	Moss Kena; Four of Diamonds
26 May 2019 (Note: The concert on 26 May 2019 in Middlesbrough was part of BBC Radio 1's Big Weekend.)	Middlesbrough	England	Stewart Park	—N/a
27 May 2019	Liverpool	England	M&S Bank Arena	Moss Kena; Four of Diamonds
28 May 2019	Leeds	England	First Direct Arena	Moss Kena; Four of Diamonds
29 May 2019	Glasgow	Scotland	SSE Hydro	Moss Kena; Four of Diamonds
31 May 2019 (Note: The concert on 31 May 2019 in Warsaw was part of Orange Warsaw Festival.)	Warsaw	Poland	Służewiec Racetrack	—N/a
8 June 2019 (Note: The concert on 8 June 2019 at Wembley Stadium in London was part of Summertime Ball.)	London	England	Wembley Stadium	—N/a
11 June 2019 (Note: The concert on 11 June 2019 at Hampton Court Palace in London was part of Sentebale Audi Concert, organised in aid of Sentebale.)	London	England	Hampton Court Palace	—N/a
16 June 2019 (Note: The concert on 16 June 2019 at Stamford Bridge in London was part of Soccer Aid, annual charity event organised in aid of UNICEF UK.)	London	England	Stamford Bridge	—N/a
5 July 2019 (Note: The concert on 5 July 2019 in Turku was part of Ruisrock festival.)	Turku	Finland	Ruissalo	—N/a
6 July 2019 (Note: The concert on 6 July 2019 in Frankfurt was part of Wireless Germany.)	Frankfurt	Germany	Alter Rebstockpark	—N/a
8 July 2019 (Note: The concert on 8 July 2019 in Montreux was part of Montreux Jazz Festival.)	Montreux	Switzerland	Montreux Convention Centre	—N/a
10 July 2019 (Note: The concert on 10 July 2019 in London was part of Amazon Prime Day.)	London	England	Village Underground	—N/a
12 July 2019 (Note: The concert on 12 July 2019 in Velence was part of EFOTT Fesztivál.)	Velence	Hungary	Lake Velence	—N/a
10 August 2019 (Note: The concert on 10 August 2019 in Zambujeira do Mar was part of MEO Sudoeste.)	Zambujeira do Mar	Portugal	Herdade da Casa Branca	—N/a
12 August 2019 (Note: The concert on 12 August 2019 in Arzachena was part of UNICEF Summer Gala.)	Arzachena	Italy	Cala di Volpe	—N/a
Asia
15 August 2019 (Note: The concert on 15 August 2019 in Incheon was part of YOURSUMMER Festival.)	Incheon	South Korea	Paradise City	—N/a
16 August 2019 (Note: The concerts on 16 August and 18 August 2019 in Tokyo and Osaka were part of Summer Sonic Festival.)	Tokyo	Japan	Chiba Marine Stadium	—N/a
18 August 2019	Osaka	Japan	Maishima Sonic Park	—N/a
Europe
24 August 2019	Windsor	England	Windsor Racecourse	—N/a
25 August 2019 (Note: The concert on 25 August 2019 in Iași was part of Afterhills Music & Arts Festival.)	Iași	Romania	Dobrovăț	—N/a
30 August 2019	Zadar	Croatia	Krešimir Ćosić Hall	Franka Batelić; Domenica
8 September 2019 (Note: The concert on 8 September 2019 in Berlin was part of Lollapalooza Berlin.)	Berlin	Germany	Olympiapark	—N/a
14 September 2019 (Note: The shows on 14 September and 28 September 2019 in Paris and Stockholm were part of Unibail-Rodamco-Westfield showcase concerts.)	Paris	France	Vélizy 2	—N/a
28 September 2019	Stockholm	Sweden	Arenatorget	—N/a
Asia
11 October 2019 (Note: The concert on 11 October 2019 in Palm Jumeirah was part of Wake Up Call Music Festival.)	Palm Jumeirah	United Arab Emirates	W Dubai – The Palm	—N/a
North America
17 October 2019 (Note: The concert on 17 October 2019 in Mexico City was part of American Express Gold event.)	Mexico City	Mexico	Casino del Bosque	—N/a
Europe
16 November 2019 (Note: The concert on 16 November 2019 in Birmingham was part of Free Radio Hits Live.)	Birmingham	England	Resorts World Arena	—N/a
7 December 2019 (Note: The concert on 7 December 2019 in London was part of Capital's Jingle Bell Ball.)	London	England	The O_{2} Arena	—N/a
Oceania
6 March 2021 (Note: The concert on 6 March 2021 in Sydney was part of Mardi Gras.)	Sydney	Australia	Sydney Cricket Ground	—N/a

== Cancelled shows ==
List of cancelled concerts, showing date, city, country, venue, and reason for cancellation
Date	City	Country	Venue	Reason
11 March 2019	Bangkok	Thailand	Crystal Arena	
21 June 2019 (Note: The cancelled performance on 21 June 2019 in Reykjavík was scheduled to be part of Secret Solstice Festival.)	Reykjavík	Iceland	Laugardalur Park	Illness
2 April 2020	Curitiba	Brazil	Ópera de Arame	COVID-19 pandemic
13 June 2020 (Note: The concert on 13 June 2020 in Moosburg was scheduled to be part of Limestone Festival.)	Moosburg an der Isar	Germany	Moosburg Aquapark	COVID-19 pandemic
4 July 2020 (Note: The concert on 4 July 2020 in London was scheduled to be part of BST Hyde Park.)	London	England	Hyde Park	COVID-19 pandemic
12 July 2020 (Note: The concert on 12 July 2020 in Glasgow was scheduled to be part of TRNSMT.)	Glasgow	Scotland	Glasgow Green	COVID-19 pandemic
17 July 2020 (Note: The concert on 16 July 2020 in Benicàssim was scheduled to be part of Festival Internacional de Benicàssim.)	Benicàssim	Spain	Costa del Azahar	COVID-19 pandemic
18 July 2020 (Note: The concert on 18 July 2020 in Paris was scheduled to be part of Lollapalooza Paris.)	Paris	France	Hippodrome de Longchamp	COVID-19 pandemic
31 July 2020 (Note: The concert on 31 July 2020 in Malmo was scheduled to be part of Big Slap festival.)	Malmö	Sweden	Pildammsparken	COVID-19 pandemic
29 August 2020 (Note: The concert on 29 August 2020 in Zürich was scheduled to be part of Zürich Openair.)	Zürich	Switzerland	Opfikon	COVID-19 pandemic
10 October 2020 (Note: The concert on 10 October 2020 in Singapore, as part of Hydeout Festival, was originally scheduled to take place on 11 April 2020, but was rescheduled and then cancelled due to COVID-19 pandemic.)	Singapore		Gardens by the Bay	COVID-19 pandemic
27 November 2020 (Note: The concert on 27 November 2020 in Buenos Aires, as part of Lollapalooza Argentina, was originally scheduled to take place on 27 March 2020, but was rescheduled and then cancelled due to the COVID-19 pandemic.)	Buenos Aires	Argentina	Hipódromo de San Isidro	COVID-19 pandemic
28 November 2020 (Note: The concert on 28 November 2020 in Santiago, as part of Lollapalooza Chile, was originally scheduled to take place on 28 March 2020, but was rescheduled and then cancelled due to the COVID-19 pandemic.)	Santiago	Chile	O'Higgins Park	COVID-19 pandemic
4 December 2020 (Note: The concert on 4 December 2020 in São Paulo, as part of Lollapalooza Brazil, was originally scheduled to take place on 3 April 2020, but was rescheduled and then cancelled due to the COVID-19 pandemic.)	São Paulo	Brazil	Autódromo de Interlagos	COVID-19 pandemic
5 December 2020 (Note: The concert on 5 December 2020 in Bogota, as part of Estéreo Picnic Festival, was originally scheduled to take place on 5 April 2020, but was rescheduled and then cancelled due to the COVID-19 pandemic.)	Bogotá	Colombia	Campo de Golf Briceño	COVID-19 pandemic
5 September 2021 (Note: The concert on 5 September 2021 in Munich, as part of Superbloom Festival, was postponed until 2022.)	Munich	Germany	Olympiapark	COVID-19 pandemic
