= The Girls Tour =

2018 concert tour by Rita Ora

- Tour by Rita Ora
- Promotional poster for the tour
- Start date: 11 May 2018
- End date: 6 October 2018
- No. of shows: 45 in Europe; 5 in North America; 50 in total

Rita Ora concert chronology
- Radioactive Tour (2013); The Girls Tour (2018); Phoenix World Tour (2019–20)

The Girls Tour was the third concert tour by British singer Rita Ora, which served as a prelude to her, then upcoming, second studio album, Phoenix (2018). The promotional concert tour began on 11 May 2018 in Glasgow, Scotland.

== Background ==
On 30 October 2017, before the release of her second studio album, Ora announced tour dates, consisting of thirteen dates across the United Kingdom and Europe. Several other dates were added later on. Furthermore, Ora's festival appearances were also announced.

== Tour dates ==
Key
Indicates original tour dates
Indicates added tour dates
Indicates festival appearances

List of concerts, showing date, city, country, venue and opening acts
Date	City	Country	Venue	Opening act(s)
Europe
11 May 2018	Glasgow	Scotland	O_{2} Academy	Raye; Kara Marni
12 May 2018	Leeds	England	O_{2} Academy	Raye; Kara Marni
13 May 2018	Newcastle	England	O_{2} Academy	Raye; Kara Marni
15 May 2018	Manchester	England	Manchester Academy	Raye; Kara Marni
16 May 2018	Birmingham	England	O_{2} Academy	Raye; Kara Marni
18 May 2018	London	England	O_{2} Brixton Academy	Raye; Kara Marni
21 May 2018	Amsterdam	Netherlands	Melkweg	Raye; Kara Marni
22 May 2018	Antwerp	Belgium	Muziekcentrum Trix	Raye; Kara Marni
23 May 2018	Paris	France	Élysée Montmartre	Raye; Kara Marni
25 May 2018	Munich	Germany	TonHalle	Kara Marni
26 May 2018	Hamburg	Germany	Große Freiheit 36	Kara Marni
27 May 2018 (Note: The 27 May 2018 concert in Swansea was part of BBC Music's Biggest Weekend.)	Copenhagen	Denmark	Vega	Kara Marni
27 May 2018	Swansea	Wales	Singleton Park	—N/a
29 May 2018 (Note: The concert in Bristol was originally planned to take place on 19 May 2018, but was rescheduled to 29 May.)	Bristol	England	O_{2} Academy	Kara Marni
3 June 2018 (Note: The 3 June 2018 concert in Tirana was part of city's summer events.)	Tirana	Albania	Skanderbeg Square	—N/a
9 June 2018 (Note: The 9 June 2018 concert in London was a part of Summertime Ball.)	London	England	Wembley Stadium	—N/a
North America
13 June 2018 (Note: The 13 June 2018 concerts in Syracuse were part of Hot 107.9's Summer Blast Off and 93Q's Summer Jam.)	Syracuse	United States	Sharkey's	—N/a
13 June 2018	Syracuse	United States	Bud Light Amphitheater	—N/a
16 June 2018 (Note: The 16 June 2018 concert in Bethel was part of K104's KFest.)	Bethel	United States	Bethel Woods Center for the Arts	—N/a
19 June 2018 (Note: The 19 June 2018 concert in Wilkes-Barre was part of WKRZ's Summer Smash.)	Wilkes-Barre	United States	F.M. Kirby Center	—N/a
Europe
22 June 2018 (Note: The 22 June 2018 concert in Newport was part of Isle of Wight Festival.)	Newport	England	Seaclose Park	—N/a
23 June 2018 (Note: The 23 June 2018 concert in Antalya was a solo show, part of Regnum Live in Concert series.)	Antalya	Turkey	Regnum Carya	—N/a
24 June 2018 (Note: The 24 June 2018 concert in Dublin was part of Summer in the City.)	Dublin	Ireland	RDS Arena	—N/a
North America
27 June 2018 (Note: The 27 June 2018 concerts in Charlotte was part of Kiss 95.1's Girls Night.)	Charlotte	United States	Rooftop 210	—N/a
Europe
30 June 2018 (Note: The 30 June 2018 concert in Skellefteå was part of Stadsfesten.)	Skellefteå	Sweden	Stadsfesten	—N/a
5 July 2018 (Note: The 5 July 2018 concert in London was part of House Festival.)	London	England	Kenwood House	—N/a
6 July 2018 (Note: The 6 July 2018 concert in Zamárdi was part of Balaton Sound.)	Zamárdi	Hungary	Lake Balaton	—N/a
7 July 2018 (Note: The 7 July 2018 concert in Poreč was part of Rise Up Festival.)	Poreč	Croatia	Uvala Peškera	—N/a
11 July 2018 (Note: The 11 July 2018 concert in Henley-on-Thames was part of Henley Festival.)	Henley-on-Thames	England	Berkshire bank of the River Thames	—N/a
14 July 2018 (Note: The 14 July 2018 concert in Manchester was part of Hits Radio Live.)	Manchester	England	Manchester Arena	—N/a
17 July 2018 (Note: The 17 July 2018 concert in Locarno was part of Moon&Stars Festival.)	Locarno	Switzerland	Piazza Grande	—N/a
21 July 2018 (Note: The 21 July 2018 concert in Barcelona was part of Share Festival.)	Barcelona	Spain	Poble Espanyol	—N/a
22 July 2018 (Note: The 22 July 2018 concert in Porto was part of Meo Marés Vivas.)	Porto	Portugal	Vila Nova de Gaia	—N/a
28 July 2018	Dundee	Scotland	Slessor Gardens	—N/a
3 August 2018 (Note: The 3 August 2018 concert in Rumšiškės was part of Granatos Live.)	Rumšiškės	Lithuania	Open-Air Museum, Rumšiškės	—N/a
4 August 2018	Sigulda	Latvia	Sigulda Castle	—N/a
7 August 2018 (Note: The 7 August 2018 concert in Monaco was part of Monte-Carlo Sporting Summer Festival.)	Monaco		Salle des Etoiles	—N/a
10 August 2018 (Note: The 10 August 2018 concert in Arzachena was part of UNICEF Summer Gala.)	Arzachena	Italy	Costa Smeralda	—N/a
11 August 2018 (Note: The 11 August 2018 concert in Ascot was part of Shergar Cup.)	Ascot	England	Ascot Racecourse	—N/a
12 August 2018 (Note: The 12 August 2018 concert in Varna was part of MTV Presents: Varna Beach.)	Varna	Bulgaria	Varna Beach	—N/a
14 August 2018 (Note: The 14 August 2018 concert was Attard was part of Summer Daze.)	Attard	Malta	Ta' Qali	—N/a
18 August 2018 (Note: The 18 August 2018 concert in Chelmsford was part of Rize Festival.)	Chelmsford	England	Hylands Park	—N/a
24 August 2018 (Note: The 24 August 2018 concert in Middlesbrough was part of Endeavour Festival.)	Middlesbrough	England	Stewart Park	—N/a
25 August 2018 (Note: The 25 August 2018 concert in Manchester was part of Manchester Pride Festival.)	Manchester	England	Canal Street	—N/a
31 August 2018 (Note: The 31 August and 1 September 2018 concerts in Maidstone and Northampton were held jointly with Craig David.)	Maidstone	England	Kent Event Centre	—N/a
1 September 2018	Northampton	England	Northamptonshire Cricket Club	—N/a
2 September 2018 (Note: The 2 September 2018 concert in La Trinneté was part of Weekender Festival.)	La Trinneté	Channel Islands	Royal Jersey Showground	—N/a
9 September 2018 (Note: The 9 September 2018 concert in London was part of Radio 2 Live in Hyde Park.)	London	England	Hyde Park	—N/a
22 September 2018 (Note: The 22 September 2018 concert in Gibraltar was part of MTV Presents Gibraltar Calling.)	Gibraltar		Victoria Stadium	—N/a
6 October 2018 (Note: The 6 October 2018 concert in Madrid was part of Coca-Cola Music Experience.)	Madrid	Spain	WiZink Center	—N/a
