= Caro Caxi =

English singer and songwriter (born 1996)

- Born: Caroline Lara Alvares; 14 August 1996 (age 29); Lambeth, London, England
- Genres: Latin pop
- Occupations: Singer; songwriter
- Years active: 2016–present
- Label: Diztortion
- Formerly of: Four of Diamonds

Caroline Lara Alvares (born 14 August 1996), known professionally as Caro Caxi, is an English singer and songwriter. She initially gained attention in 2016 as part of the girl group Four of Diamonds, who competed on the thirteenth series of The X Factor UK. The group finished in eighth place and went on to be signed to EMI Records, releasing numerous singles, before ultimately going on an indefinite hiatus in 2020. Since leaving the group, she has written material for various singers and released Latin pop music under the stage name Caro Caxi.

== Life and career ==
Caroline Lara Alvares was born on 14 August 1996 in Lambeth, London. She was born to a Spanish mother and an Indian father and grew up with various cultures present in her upbringing. She grew up predominantly in Brixton, but also spent time in Spain. In her youth, she attended Streatham and Clapham High School and Graveney School's sixth form college, before going on to attain a BA in the study of commercial music at the University of Westminster. In 2016, alongside Yasmin Broom, Sophia Saffarian and Lauren Rammell, she became a member of the girl group Four of Diamonds. Later that year, they auditioned for the thirteenth series of The X Factor UK, initially making it through to the "judges' houses" stage of the series before being eliminated. However, it was later announced that Four of Diamonds would take Brooks Way's place for the remainder of the live shows, starting in week 2. They eventually finished in eighth place. Following the conclusion of the series, the final eight contestants co-headlined The X Factor Live Tour in 2017.

In 2018, Four of Diamonds signed with EMI Records, becoming the first girl group to be signed to EMI since the Spice Girls.. They released a string of singles, including collaborations with Burna Boy, Saweetie and Mr Eazi. They also supported Rita Ora on the Phoenix World Tour across the United Kingdom. The group's debut album was produced by Jonas Blue, but it was ultimately never released, with the group announcing an indefinite hiatus in 2020 due to the COVID-19 pandemic.

Following Four of Diamonds, Alvares began performing under the stage name Caro Caxi. Her friends has always nicknamed her Caro, but she wanted to elongate it, eventually settling on Caxi (pronounced "cash-ee"). She liked that it sounded like "cash" and felt it sounded expensive. She began writing songs for other artists, the first of which was Yendry. She then wrote "Out Out" for Becky G; however, she later reworked the song for Charli XCX, who invited her to be on a remix of the song. Since she was still developing her solo sound, she was unsure whether to feature but ultimately accepted. After continuing to write for other artists, she eventually released her debut single, "Click", in 2021. The song featured Dyce and was produced by Diztortion, who also signed Caro Caxi to his record label. She had met Diztortion through songwriting sessions years prior and accredited him with understanding her musical vision immediately, appreciating that she took risks. She has since released singles including "De Mi Mama" and "Diva", as well as her debut extended play, Tigresa (2026).

== Artistry ==
Caro Caxi's music has been compared to the works of Shakira, Missy Elliott and Daddy Yankee. She has also cited Rosalía, J Balvin and Christina Aguilera as musical inspirations.

== Discography ==
=== Extended plays ===
List of extended plays, with release details
Title	Details
Tigresa	Released: 15 May 2026; Label: Diztortion; Formats: Digital download, streaming

=== Singles ===
==== As lead artist ====
List of singles as lead artist, showing year released and album name
Title	Year	Album
"Click" (featuring Dyce)	2025	Non-album singles
"De Mi Mama"	2025	Non-album singles
"Diva"	2025	Non-album singles
"Linda"	2026	Tigresa
"Escaparelli"	2026	Tigresa
"Mejor"	2026	Tigresa

==== As featured artist ====
List of singles as a featured artist, showing year released and album name
Title	Year	Album
"Out Out" (Joel Corry and Jax Jones featuring Charli XCX and Caro Caxi)	2021	Non-album singles
"Chula" (Puri featuring Caro Caxi)	2024	Non-album singles

=== Songwriting credits ===
List of songwriting credits, with year released and album name
Title	Year	Artist(s)	Album
"Ocean"	2021	Jay1	Non-album singles
"Ki-Ki"	2022	Yendry	Non-album singles
"Bachillerato"	2023	Yakozuki, Andy Paradise, Oscarcito	Non-album singles
"Hererra"	2023	Yendry	Non-album singles
"Put Your Hands Up"	2023	Marvin Humes	Non-album singles
"Tiki Tiki"	2023	Ptazeta, Lola Índigo	Gorgona
"Agua"	2024	Chanel	¡Agua!
"La Familia"	2024	Kevin the Bear, Lea Reyna	Non-album single
"Mata"	2024	Abus, Majin	Queendom
"N'Golo"	2024	Ptazeta, La Pantera	Gorgona
"Layla"	2025	Dyce	Non-album single
