= Phoenix (Rita Ora album) =

Studio album by Rita Ora
- Released: 23 November 2018
- Studios: Chuck's Place; Gold Tooth Music (Beverly Hills); Deep Cuts; Henson; Eastwood; Westlake; MXM (Los Angeles); KBK; Jack & Coke; Linxegatan 82 (Stockholm); Ten87; Kensaltown; RAK; Abbey Road; Rockstone; Metropolis; Sarm; Intergalactic; Major Toms (London); Matzah Ball; Downtown; Sterling Sound (New York City); Larrabee Sound (North Hollywood)
- Genres: Pop; dance-pop; R&B
- Length: 40:54
- Label: Atlantic UK
- Producers: Alesso; Avicii; Louis Bell; Ben Billions; Benny Blanco; Julian Bunetta; Cashmere Cat; Caspar; Jonny Coffer; Digital Farm Animals; Fred Gibson; Jack & Coke; Peter Karlsson; Finn Keane; Steve Mac; Jimmy Napes; Ali Payami; Rudimental; John Ryan; Romans; Sir Nolan; Stargate; Andrew Watt; Yogi

Rita Ora chronology
Ora (2012)	Phoenix (2018)	Bang (2021)

Singles from Phoenix
- 1. "Your Song" Released: 26 May 2017; 2. "Anywhere" Released: 20 October 2017; 3. "Girls" Released: 11 May 2018; 4. "Let You Love Me" Released: 21 September 2018; 5. "Only Want You" Released: 1 March 2019

Phoenix is the second studio album by the British singer Rita Ora. It was released on 23 November 2018 through Atlantic Records UK, marking Ora's first studio release since her previous studio album, Ora, in 2012. Ora announced the album on 18 September, and it was made available for pre-order on the same day.

The album spawned three top ten UK singles including "Your Song", "Anywhere" and "Let You Love Me", as well as a top forty single, "Girls". Phoenix also includes two collaborations from other projects, including "Lonely Together" from Avicii's last release Avīci (01) (2017) and "For You (Fifty Shades Freed)" with Liam Payne, taken from the Fifty Shades Freed: Original Motion Picture Soundtrack (2018).

The album received generally favourable reviews from music critics. Phoenix charted in the top twenty in the UK, Ireland, Australia and New Zealand amongst other countries. Ora supported the album with two concert tours, the Girls Tour (2018) and the Phoenix World Tour (2019–2020).

== Background ==
In December 2015, Ora started legal proceedings against Roc Nation, seeking release from the record label and citing that the contract she signed in 2008 was "unenforceable", due to California's "seven-year rule". The complaint stated that she had "only been permitted to release one album despite creating multiple additional records for release" and that her relationship with Roc Nation was "irrevocably damaged". In January 2016, Roc Nation filed a counter-lawsuit against Ora for breaking her recording contract. They reached a settlement in May 2016.

In June 2016, it was confirmed that Ora had signed a global record deal with Atlantic Records UK. Soon after, she began to work on her second studio album. In an interview with Billboard Radio China, Ora said of the process:

I had a bit of an issue, publicly, with putting out music which got me really, really, kind of devastated, and I was really down, and then I was really angry, and then I was really frustrated, and then I was really happy that it was happening.

Elaborating on what fans could expect from the album, Ora said:

It was all these emotions, so my album is definitely a rollercoaster of emotions. [...] I'm still crazy – like, I still love to go out and party. Everyone who knows me knows that I love to have a good time, but I wanted this album to also be [something] you could put on and vibe with your friends. There's a lot of ups and downs, but I'm very, very proud of it.

== Music and lyrics ==
Phoenix is a pop, dance-pop, and R&B album. It incorporates a mixture of genres including EDM-lite beats as well as electronic anthems like "Lonely Together"—Ora's joint collaboration with Avicii—"Anywhere", and the Rudimental collaboration "Summer Love". The latter also contains elements of drum and bass music. Ora's vocals were described by The Guardian's Tara Joshi as both "wispy" and "powerful", and by NME' Hannah Mylrea as "distinctive". "Anywhere" was produced by Alesso and Sir Nolan, described by The Independent as a "hazy EDM banger" and by Mylrea as a "chunk of electropop". Critics noted that it has several bridges and a gritty drop. Meanwhile, on the mid-tempo track "Let You Love Me", Ora explores emotional barriers with lyrics that include "I wish that I could let you love me/ Say what's the matter with me?".

"Your Song" has a minimalist production largely consisting of drum pads. The song "New Look" takes a different direction; it is a Scandi-pop and tropical song produced by Swedish outfit Jack & Coke. Its production sounds like "it's being played on a radio with intermittent signal". There are several collaborations on the album including "Keep Talking" which features Julia Michaels and was described by Joshi as both "intriguing" and "euphoric". Another collaboration, "Girls", features American rapper Cardi B, American singer Bebe Rexha and British singer Charli XCX. It was described as AllMusic's Neil Yeung as a "bold statement" and a "saucy, sex-positive anthem for the 21st century". Critics such as Joshi (The Guardian) noted that it was an ode to bisexuality.

Themes on the album include love and in particular "struggling or heat-of-the-moment relationships" as seen on the songs "Falling to Pieces", "First Time High" and "Only Want You", with the latter also being released as a single and spawning a remix featuring vocals by American singer 6lack. "Falling to Pieces" features a trumpet interlude after each chorus and closes out the track with a trumpet outro. Meanwhile, Padin Malvika from Clash noted that "First Time High" has a breezy sound that "leaves you feeling happier and lighter", whilst "Only Want You" was noted for its electro production.

Towards the end of the album, "Velvet Rope" and "Cashmere" are ballads that combine influences from jazz and R&B. "Velvet Rope" is a "smooth, slowed-down R&B jam about a scorned ex-lover left wondering how her relationship collapsed." The song features a stripped back piano melody with a chorus of backing singers. In a slight contrast, Billboard's Sophie Ding said the song "features soaring, multilayered melodies over deep reverbs as Ora sings about exploring a new relationship".

The album also includes Ora's joint single with Liam Payne, "For You", which was released in promotion of Fifty Shades Freed (2018), the third and final film in the erotic romantic drama film series Fifty Shades.

== Promotion and release ==
Ora said that the album would be released sometime after March 2018. Then during an interview with Glamour (Germany), she announced that it was now coming out in autumn 2018. On 18 September 2018, Ora revealed the title of her second studio album and its release date, 23 November. The same day, the album was made available for pre-order.

In the eight days leading up to the album's release a number of songs were released as promotional countdown singles including: "Velvet Rope" on 15 November 2018, "Cashmere" on 19 November 2018 and "Falling to Pieces" on 21 November 2018.

=== Singles ===
"Your Song" was released on 26 May 2017 as the album's lead single. The song peaked at number seven on the UK Singles Chart, becoming Ora's ninth single to reach the top ten in the UK. "Anywhere" was released on 20 October 2017 as the second single from the album. The song reached number two in the UK.

"Girls", featuring Cardi B, Bebe Rexha and Charli XCX, was released on 11 May 2018. Ora performed the song live for the first time at the 2017 BBC Radio 1's Big Weekend, one year before its official release. "Let You Love Me" was released as the album's fourth single on 21 September 2018. Reaching a peak of number four, it made Ora the first British female solo artist with thirteen top ten songs in the UK. The fifth and final single, "Only Want You" was released on 1 March 2019 with a feature from 6lack.

=== Other songs ===
"Lonely Together" was released on 11 August 2017 as a joint single from Avicii's EP, Avīci (01). The song reached number four on the UK Singles Chart. "For You" was released with Liam Payne on 5 January 2018 as the lead single from the Fifty Shades Freed soundtrack. The song peaked at number eight in the UK.

During November 2018, Ora released three promotional singles from the album, "Velvet Rope", "Cashmere" and "Falling to Pieces".

=== Tour ===
On 29 October 2018, Ora announced that she would be embarking on the Phoenix World Tour in 2019 in support of Phoenix, consisting of twenty-four dates across Europe, Asia and Oceania from 1 March until 29 May 2019.

== Critical reception ==
Professional ratings
Aggregate scores
Source	Rating
Metacritic	76/100
Review scores
Source	Rating
AllMusic	4/5 stars
Clash	8/10
Evening Standard	4/5 stars
Financial Times	4/5 stars
The Guardian	3/5 stars
The Independent	4/5 stars
Newsday	2.3/4 stars
NME	4/5 stars
The Times	4/5 stars

Phoenix received positive reviews from music critics. According to the review aggregator Metacritic, Phoenix received "generally favorable reviews" based on a weighted average score of 76 out of 100 from seven critic scores.

Clash magazine's Malvika Padin described the album as a "nostalgic yet refreshing collection of songs that oscillates seamlessly between upbeat pop offerings to raw pieces which showcases the 27-year-old’s songwriting skills [...] In spite of an occasional experimentation, overall the album plays to her strengths – as her vocals and lyricism shine – without straying too far from her signature pop and R&B sound." Tara Joshi from The Guardian wrote: "Buoyant and gleaming, Phoenix bubbles with soaring, EDM-lite beats and Ora’s wispy-powerful vocals – albeit with generic lyrics about love and fame." She felt that the album was "perfectly fine, but its strongest moments make you realise that it could have been great." NME found that the album was "everything you'd want it to be: endlessly fun, stuffed full of brilliantly left-field production and ear-worm choruses. It may have taken six long years to arrive, but Phoenix is Ora’s proof that good things come to those who wait."

Ludovic Hunter-Tilney from The Financial Times felt that the album was "irresistibly catchy" and called it a "well-constructed, consistently performed exercise in stabilising an undervalued musical brand." Evening Standard's Elizabeth Aubrey remarked that "while she is a star who can divide opinion — mostly through her work away from music — [Ora] is at her most successful when following her own musical path and this record is an assured step forward." Alexandra Pollard, writing for The Independent, felt that Phoenix was a "surprisingly coherent record." While she found a "few low points" on the album, [...] for the most part, though, Phoenix is worth the wait – whether you were doing so with indifference or bated breath." Ed Potton from The Times remarked that "after some problematic years, Rita Ora’s first album since 2012 is a reminder that she has one of the finest voices in pop." AllMusic editor Neil Z. Yeung rated the album four out of five stars. He called the album a "confident pop gem that stands tall on its own" and noted that "the strength of Ora's effortless, R&B-inspired vocals carries Phoenix. Phoenix was later included on AllMusic's "favourite pop albums of 2018" year-end list.

== Track listing ==
Standard edition
No.	Title	Lyrics	Music	Producer(s)	Length
1.	"Anywhere"	Rita Sahatçiu Ora; Alexandra Tamposi; Brian D. Lee	Andrew Wotman; Nolan "Sir Nolan" Lambroza; Alessandro "Alesso" Lindblad; Nick Gale	Alesso; Watt^{[a]}; Sir Nolan	3:35
2.	"Let You Love Me"	Noonie Bao; Ilsey Juber	Ora; Linus Wiklund; Fred Gibson; Finn Keane	Finn Keane; Fred	3:10
3.	"New Look"	Bao; Juber	Ora; Jordan Suecof; Jakob Hazell; Svante Halldin	Jack & Coke	2:34
4.	"Lonely Together" (Avicii featuring Rita Ora)	Lee; Tamposi	Wotman; Tim "Avicii" Bergling; Benjamin Levin; Magnus August Høiberg	Avicii; Benny Blanco; Watt; Cashmere Cat	3:03
5.	"Your Song"	Edward Sheeran	Sheeran; Steve McCutcheon	Steve Mac	3:00
6.	"Only Want You"	Emily Warren; Tamposi	Wotman; Louis Bell; Carl Rosen	Watt; Bell	3:00
7.	"First Time High"	Tamposi; John Ryan	Wotman; Julian Scanlan	Watt; Slushii	3:02
8.	"For You (Fifty Shades Freed)" (with Liam Payne)	Tamposi	Tamposi; Wotman; Alexander Payami	Watt; Ali Payami; Peter Karlsson	4:04
9.	"Summer Love" (with Rudimental)	Ora; Deleon Blake; Romeo Testa	Amir Izadkhah; Piers Aggett; Kesi Dryden; Leon Rolle; Yogesh Tulsiani	Rudimental; Yogi	4:17
10.	"Girls" (featuring Cardi B, Bebe Rexha and Charli XCX)	Ora; Balcalis Almanzar; Lee; Tamposi	Ben Diehl; Jonny Coffer; Lee; Tamposi; Jordan Thorpe; Wotman	Watt; Jonny Coffer; Ben Billions; Jerome Williams^{[b]}	3:41
11.	"Keep Talking" (featuring Julia Michaels)	Julia Michaels; Justin Tranter	Mikkel Eriksen; Tor Hermansen	Stargate	3:33
12.	"Hell of a Life"	Tamposi; Lee	Tamposi; Wotman; Lee; Bell	Watt; Bell	3:55
Total length:					40:54

Japan limited edition
No.	Title	Writer(s)	Producer(s)	Length
13.	"Anywhere" (R3hab Remix)	Ora; Lee; Lambroza; Tamposi; Gale; Wotman; Lindblad	Watt; Sir Nolan; Alesso	2:54
14.	"Let You Love Me" (Möwe Remix)	Ora; Wiklund; Keane; Parmenius; Gibson; Juber	Fred; Keane	3:06
Total length:				46:54

Deluxe edition
No.	Title	Lyrics	Music	Producer(s)	Length
13.	"Velvet Rope"	Ora	Ora; James Napier; Samuel Romans	Jimmy Napes; Romans; Caspar	3:55
14.	"Falling to Pieces"	Ora; Lee	Ora; Wotman; Gale; Lee; Oliver Roddigan	Watt; Digital Farm Animals; GA^{[b]}	4:21
15.	"Cashmere"	Tamposi; Ryan	Wotman; Julian Bunetta	Watt; Ryan; Bunetta	2:55
16.	"Soul Survivor"	Ora; Georgia Overton	Eriksen; Hermansen	Stargate	3:29
Total length:					55:34

=== Notes ===
- ^{^[a]} also vocal producer.
- ^{^[b]} denotes additional production.

== Credits and personnel ==
Credits were adapted from the liner notes.

=== Recording studios ===
- Chuck's Place (Beverly Hills)
- Deep Cuts (Los Angeles)
- KBK (Stockholm)
- Ten87 Studios (London)
- Kensaltown Studios (London)
- RAK Studios (London)
- Jack & Coke Studios (Stockholm)
- Abbey Road (London)
- Linxegatan 82 (Stockholm)
- Matzah Ball (New York City)
- Downtown Studios (New York City)
- Henson Studios (Los Angeles)
- Rockstone Studios (London)
- Eastwood Studios (Los Angeles)
- Metropolis Studios (London)
- Westlake Studios (Los Angeles)
- Gold Tooth Music (Beverly Hills)
- Sarm Studios (London)
- Intergalactic Studios (London)
- MXM Studios (Los Angeles)
- Sterling Sound (New York City)
- Major Toms Studios (London)
- Larrabee Sound Studios (North Hollywood)

=== Performers ===
- Rita Ora – lead vocals, background vocals
- Piers Aggett – background vocals
- Amir Amor – background vocals
- Avicii – lead artist (track 4)
- Cardi B – featured vocals (track 10)
- Charli XCX – featured vocals (track 10)
- Kesi Dryden – background vocals
- Fred Gibson – background vocals
- Max Grahn – background vocals
- Jakob Jerlström – background vocals
- Peter Karlsson – background vocals
- Finn Keane – background vocals
- Brian D. Lee – background vocals
- Julia Michaels – featured vocals (track 11)
- Ali Payami – background vocals
- Liam Payne – lead vocals (track 8), background vocals
- Mary Pearce – background vocals
- Bebe Rexha – featured vocals (track 10)
- Leon Rolle – background vocals
- Rudimental – co-lead artist (track 9)
- Ed Sheeran – background vocals (track 5)
- Ali Tamposi – background vocals
- Andrew Watt – background vocals

=== Musicians and technicians ===
- Piers Aggett – piano, synthesizer
- Alesso – instrumentation, keyboards, producer, programming
- Amir Amor – drum programming, guitar
- Chris Athens – mastering
- Avicii – instrumentation, keyboards, programming
- Louis Bell – engineer, instrumentation, keyboards, producer, programming
- Conor Bellis – assistant engineer
- Zara Beyounces – violin
- Ben Billions – keyboards, producer
- Tim Blacksmith – executive producer
- Benny Blanco – instrumentation, keyboards, producer, programming
- Cashmere Cat – instrumentation, keyboards, producer, programming
- Jeff Citron – assistant engineer
- Jonny Coffer – keyboards, piano, producer, programming
- Jeremy Cooper – arranger, editing
- Anna Croad – violin
- Hales Curtis – design
- Danny D. – executive producer
- Rosie Danvers – cello, string arrangements
- Fiona Davies – viola
- Brendan Dekora – vocal engineer
- Kesi Dryden – bass, keyboards
- Mikkel Storleer Eriksen – engineer, programming
- Michael Freeman – assistant mixer
- Serban Ghenea – mixing
- Fred Gibson – drums, guitar, keyboards, producer, programming
- Kevin Grainger – mastering
- Josh Gudwin – guitar engineer
- John Hanes – engineer
- Stuart Hawkes – mastering
- Tor Erik Hermansen – programming
- Sam Holland – engineer
- Jack & Coke – arranger, drums, instrumentation, keyboards, producer
- Sally Jackson – violin
- Jaycen Joshua – mixing
- Peter Karlsson – vocal producer
- Finn Keane – drums, keyboards, producer, programming
- Patrick Kiernan – violin
- Dave Kutch – mastering
- Paul Lamalfa – vocal engineer
- Nolan Lambroza – instrumentation, keyboards, programming
- Chris Laws – drums, engineer
- Jeremy Lertola – assistant engineer
- Steve Mac – keyboards, piano, producer
- Eleanor Mathieson – violin
- Randy Merrill – mastering
- Steve Morris – violin
- Jane Oliver – cello
- Emma Owens – viola
- Ali Payami – bass, drums, horns, keyboards, percussion, producer, programming
- Geoff Pesche – mastering
- Richard Pryce – double bass
- Dann Pursey – engineer
- Cory Rice – assistant engineer
- Robbie Nelson – engineer
- Lewis Roberts – additional production, keyboards, programming
- David Rodriguez – engineer
- Leon Rolle – keyboards, percussion
- Rudimental – producer
- Kotono Sato – violin
- Chris Sclafani – engineer
- Ed Sheeran – guitar
- Sir Nolan – producer
- Stargate – producer
- Mark "Spike" Stent – mixing
- Andrew Watt – bass, guitar, instrumentation, keyboards, producer, programming, vocal producer
- Steven Weston – engineer
- Deborah Widdup – violin
- Jerome Williams – additional production, programming
- Daniel Zaidenstadt – engineer, vocal engineer

=== Artwork ===
- Hayley Louisa Brown – photography
- Hales Curtis – design

== Charts ==
=== Weekly charts ===
Weekly sales chart performance
Chart (2018–2019)	Peak position
Australian Albums (ARIA)	15
Austrian Albums (Ö3 Austria)	43
Belgian Albums (Ultratop Flanders)	31
Belgian Albums (Ultratop Wallonia)	69
Canadian Albums (Billboard)	36
Croatian International Albums (HDU)	6
Danish Albums (Hitlisten)	36
Dutch Albums (Album Top 100)	30
Estonian Albums (IFPI)	9
Finnish Albums (Suomen virallinen lista)	14
French Albums (SNEP)	103
German Albums (Offizielle Top 100)	13
Hungarian Albums (MAHASZ)	31
Irish Albums (IRMA)	19
Italian Albums (FIMI)	63
Japanese Albums (Oricon)	121
Japan Hot Albums (Billboard Japan)	59
Latvian Albums (LAIPA)	8
Lithuanian Albums (AGATA)	4
New Zealand Albums (RMNZ)	18
Norwegian Albums (VG-lista)	34
Scottish Albums (Official Charts)	21
Slovak Albums (ČNS IFPI)	56
South Korean International Albums (Circle)	33
Spanish Albums (Promusicae)	69
Swedish Albums (Sverigetopplistan)	33
Swiss Albums (Schweizer Hitparade)	18
UK Albums (Official Charts)	11
US Billboard 200	79

=== Year-end charts ===
Annual sales chart performance
Chart (2019)	Position
Australian Albums (ARIA)	70
Irish Albums (IRMA)	48
New Zealand Albums (RMNZ)	44
UK Albums (OCC)	45

== Certifications ==
Sales certifications
Region	Certification	Certified units/sales
Canada (Music Canada)	Gold	40,000^{‡}
Netherlands (NVPI)	Gold	20,000^{‡}
New Zealand (RMNZ)	Platinum	15,000^{‡}
Norway (IFPI Norway)	3× Platinum	60,000^{‡}
Poland (ZPAV)	Platinum	20,000^{‡}
Singapore (RIAS)	Gold	5,000^{*}
Taiwan (RIT)	Gold	5,000
United Kingdom (BPI)	Platinum	300,000^{‡}
^{*} Sales figures based on certification alone.^{‡} Sales+streaming figures based on certification alone.

== Release history ==
Release formats
Region	Date	Format	Edition	Label	Ref.
Various	23 November 2018	CD; digital download	Standard; deluxe	Atlantic UK; Warner	
Various	8 February 2019	LP	Deluxe	East West; Warner	
