= Four of Diamonds =

English girl group

- Origin: London, England
- Genres: R&B; pop; dance-pop
- Years active: 2016–2020
- Label: EMI Records
- Past members: Caroline Alvares; Yasmin Broom; Lauren Rammell; Sophia Saffarian
- Website: fourofdiamonds.co.uk

Four of Diamonds were an English girl group composed of Caroline Alvares, Yasmin Broom, Lauren Rammell and Sophia Saffarian. In 2016, they competed in the thirteenth series of The X Factor, where they were the fifth act eliminated. In 2018, they signed to EMI Records. After four years together, they went on an indefinite hiatus in 2020.

== History ==
=== 2016–2017: The X Factor ===
A week before their audition for The X Factor, the group chose their name in a rehearsal studio, inspired by a card game they were playing. They narrowed their options down to Four of Diamonds and Four of Hearts. They went with Four of Diamonds because of how popular diamonds are, as well as how strong the stones can be.

Four of Diamonds auditioned for The X Factor in the third set of room auditions, performing "No" by Meghan Trainor. They then progressed to bootcamp and the six-chair challenge, gaining a seat and making it through to judges' houses, mentored by Louis Walsh. They were eventually sent home by Walsh. However, on 10 October 2016, it was announced that Four of Diamonds would take Brooks Way's place for the remainder of the live shows, starting in week 2. In week three, Four of Diamonds were in the bottom two against Relley C. They sang "Who Are You" by Fifth Harmony and were saved by Walsh, Nicole Scherzinger and Simon Cowell. Voting statistics revealed that Relley C received more votes than Four of Diamonds in the main vote, meaning if Cowell sent the result to deadlock, Relley C would have been saved. The following week, they were in the bottom two against Gifty Louise; they sang "The Voice Within" by Christina Aguilera and were saved by Walsh, Scherzinger and Sharon Osbourne. Once again, Four of Diamonds came behind Louise in the main public vote meaning that if Osbourne sent the result to deadlock, Louise would have been saved. They were sent home on week 5, after a sing-off against Saara Aalto, when only Walsh voted to save them. In this sing-off, they sang "When You Believe" by Whitney Houston and Mariah Carey. However, voting statistics revealed that Four of Diamonds and Aalto received more votes than Sam Lavery in the public main vote; meaning if there was no lifeline vote, or if Aalto won the lifeline vote, Four of Diamonds would have competed against Lavery in the final showdown instead of Aalto. Additionally, in that scenario, if the result went to deadlock, Four of Diamonds would have been saved and Lavery would have been eliminated. Following the conclusion of the series, the final eight contestants co-headlined The X Factor Live Tour around in 2017. As part of this concert tour, Four of Diamonds performed to over 200,000 people across the United Kingdom.

The X Factor performances and results
Show	Song choice	Theme	Result
Auditions	"No" – Meghan Trainor	—N/a	Through to bootcamp
Bootcamp	Unknown	—N/a	Through to six-chair challenge
Six-chair challenge	"Stop!" – Jamelia	—N/a	Through to judges' houses
Judges' houses	"Royals" – Lorde	—N/a	Eliminated
Live show 1	—N/a	Express Yourself	Through to live shows, as Brooks Way's replacement
Live show 2	"You Keep Me Hangin' On" – The Supremes	Motown	Safe (6th)
Live show 3	"Lady Marmalade"/"Bang Bang" – Christina Aguilera, Lil' Kim, Mýa and Pink/ Jessie J, Ariana Grande and Nicki Minaj	Divas & Legends	Bottom three (10th)
Live show 3	"Who Are You" – Fifth Harmony	Sing-off	Safe (majority vote)
Live show 4	"Ghost" – Ella Henderson	Fright Night	Bottom three (9th)
Live show 4	"The Voice Within" – Christina Aguilera	Sing-off	Safe (majority vote)
Live show 5	"Hold On" – Wilson Phillips	Girlband vs Boyband	Bottom three (7th)
Live show 5	"When You Believe" – Whitney Houston and Mariah Carey	Sing-off	Eliminated (eighth place)

=== 2018–2020: Single releases ===
On 14 June 2018, Four of Diamonds released their debut single, "Name on It", featuring Burna Boy. In September 2018, they signed with EMI Records, becoming the first girl group to be signed to EMI since the Spice Girls. Following their signing, they released their second single, "Stupid Things", featuring Saweetie. On 30 November 2018, their third single, "Blind" was released. The song sampled "Too Blind to See It" by Kym Sims and was produced by Jonas Blue. Blue was also confirmed as the executive producer of their ultimately-unreleased debut album. Later that month, they held a three-date concert tour across England, visiting Birmingham, Manchester and London. On 17 May 2019, the group released their fourth single, "Walk Away", In an interview with Coup De Main, they revealed that both Rihanna and Zara Larsson recorded demos for "Walk Away", but the song was given to Four of Diamonds. The single was supported by a concert held in London.

In May 2019, it was announced that Four of Diamonds would support Rita Ora on the Phoenix World Tour across the United Kingdom. After their performance at the O2 Arena, Philip Logan of CelebMix wrote that they "sparked an energy in the room", and that "commanding the audiences attention with immediate effect, the girls made the O2 stage their own – performing a strong set complete with slick choreography, tight vocal harmonies and killer tunes. With a confidence and chemistry that most girl bands can only dream of, there's a genuine and undeniable sense of camaraderie between the ladies as they perform, so powerful that it translates from the stage right into the audience creating a visceral connection between them and their fans." On 30 May 2019, they performed "Walk Away" on Blue Peter, and the next day, they appeared as the musical guest on Britain's Got More Talent.

In July 2019, they performed at Bristol Pride, and later headlined a show at Borderline, London. In August 2019, they performed as musical guests at CBBC's Summer Social event, as well as Manchester Pride. On 19 September 2019, they released their fifth single, "Eating Me Up", accompanied by a music video. Spindle described the song as "empowering, raw and relatable" and featured it on their playlist. On 31 October 2019, the group released the song "Long Way To Go", accompanied by a music video. Broom stated that the song has a double-meaning: it can be interpreted as describing being lied to in a relationship or about the importance of self-acceptance.

On 7 February 2020, the group released "Let Me Love You", a cover of the 2004 song by Mario. It was followed by the release of "Superstar" in collaboration with Dutch producer Joe Stone on 27 March 2020. On 29 May 2020, Four of Diamonds released "The Writer" featuring Nigerian singer Mr Eazi, which Robin Murray of Clash described as "a neat pop burner with a taste of afrobeats". In November 2020, they released the song "Never Learn My Lesson" via Fascination after parting with EMI. Their final single prior to their hiatus, "Your Problem", was released in December 2020. Five years afterwards, Broom revealed that the COVID-19 pandemic] played a large role in their decision to split since they could not perform live due to lockdowns Following her comments, the Four of Diamonds Instagram account hinted as a potential reunion.

== Members ==
=== Caroline Alvares ===
Caroline Lara Alvares (born 14 August 1996) was born in Lambeth, London, England and is of Spanish and Indian descent. Before joining the group, she studied music at the University of Westminster. Her favourite artists include Rosalía and J Balvin. Since the group's hiatus, she has released Latin pop music under the stage name Caro Caxi.

=== Yasmin Broom ===
Yasmin Lauryn Broom (born 25 November 1998) was born in Stretford, Greater Manchester, England and attended Flixton Girls' School before studying at Access to Music College in Manchester. During her early career, she performed at local events, including the Urmston Live Festival. Her musical influences include artists such as Cardi B and Jorja Smith. In 2020, performing under the stage name Yasmin Lauryn, featured on "D.B.A.", a track by Dutch rapper and professional footballer Memphis Depay. She also performs sets as a DJ. In 2025, Broom gained further public attention as a contestant on the twelfth series of Love Island.

=== Lauren Rammell ===
Lauren Rammell (born 18 June 1994) was born in Hersham, Surrey, England. At the age of eleven, Rammell portrayed the role of Little Cosette in a West End production of Les Misérables. Before joining the group, Rammell attended the Italia Conti Academy, and worked as a dance teacher and at a supermarket. Her favourite artists include Beyoncé and Lewis Capaldi.

=== Sophia Saffarian ===
Sophia Saffarian (born 25 November 1996) was born in Birmingham, England. Growing up, she attended Hallfield School and King Edward VI High School for Girls, both independent schools in Edgbaston, and also sang in the Birmingham Gospel Choir. Before joining the group, Saffarian was studying Bioveterinary Science at Hartpury University, in the hope of becoming a vet. From 2022, Saffarian began releasing solo music. In 2024, whilst beginning a law degree at the University of Law, Saffarian was diagnosed with multiple sclerosis.

== Discography ==
=== Extended plays ===
Title	Details
Eastside + More	Released: 20 September 2018; Label: Virgin EMI Records; Format: Digital download, streaming

=== Singles ===
Title	Year	Album
"Name on It" (featuring Burna Boy)	2018	Non-album singles
"Stupid Things" (featuring Saweetie)	2018	Non-album singles
"Blind"	2018	Non-album singles
"Walk Away"	2019	Non-album singles
"Eating Me Up"	2019	Non-album singles
"Long Way to Go"	2019	Non-album singles
"Let Me Love You"	2020	Non-album singles
"Superstar" (with Joe Stone)	2020	Non-album singles
"The Writer" (featuring Mr Eazi)	2020	Non-album singles
"Never Learn My Lesson"	2020	Non-album singles
"Your Problem"	2020	Non-album singles

=== Music videos ===
Title	Year	Other artist(s)
"Name On It"	2018	Burna Boy
"Stupid Things"	2018	Saweetie
"Blind"	2018	None
"Walk Away"	2019	None
"Eating Me Up"	2019	None
"Long Way To Go"	2019	None
"Let Me Love You"	2020	None
"The Writer"	2020	Mr Eazi

== Concert tours ==
Co-headlining

- The X Factor Live Tour (2017)

Supporting

- Phoenix World Tour (2019)
