= Your Song (Rita Ora song) =

2017 single by Rita Ora

Single by Rita Ora

from the album Phoenix
- Released: 26 May 2017
- Genre: Electro-pop
- Length: 3:00
- Label: Atlantic
- Songwriters: Ed Sheeran; Steve Mac
- Producer: Steve Mac

Rita Ora singles chronology
"Coming Home" (2015)	"Your Song" (2017)	"Lonely Together" (2017)

Music video
- "Your Song" on YouTube

"Your Song" is a song by the British singer Rita Ora from her second studio album, Phoenix (2018). The song was written by Steve Mac and Ed Sheeran, with the production completed by Mac. It was released as the lead single from the album for digital download and streaming in various countries by Atlantic on 26 May 2017. A Caribbean-inspired electro-pop love song, Ora displays her overwhelming desire in the lyrics to share her emotions with the world, inspired by the happiness that her boyfriend brings into her life. The song earned critical acclaim from music critics following its release, who mostly highlighted Ora's vocal delivery and the music and lyrics.

"Your Song" achieved widespread success and reached the top 10 in countries such as Austria, Croatia, Belgium, Ireland, Luxembourg, Scotland and the United Kingdom, while also charting in the top 50 in 19 other countries. The song topped the US Billboard Dance Club Songs chart and reached number 23 on the Bubbling Under Hot 100 as well as number 69 on the Canadian Hot 100. It received several gold and platinum certifications in multiple countries, such as triple gold in Germany, double platinum in Norway, Poland and the UK as well quintuple platinum from the Australian Recording Industry Association (ARIA) in Australia.

Directed by Michael Haussman and filmed in Vancouver, the music video for "Your Song" premiered to YouTube on 22 June 2017. It mostly showcases Ora in a boardroom meeting where she surprises her colleagues by dancing on the table and walking away. Four remixes accompanied the song, including a rendition by Cheat Codes and Sick Individuals. To further promote the song, Ora performed it in 2017 at a number of televised events and shows, including The Ellen DeGeneres Show, The Tonight Show Starring Jimmy Fallon, MTV Europe Music Awards and Teen Choice Awards.

== Background and composition ==
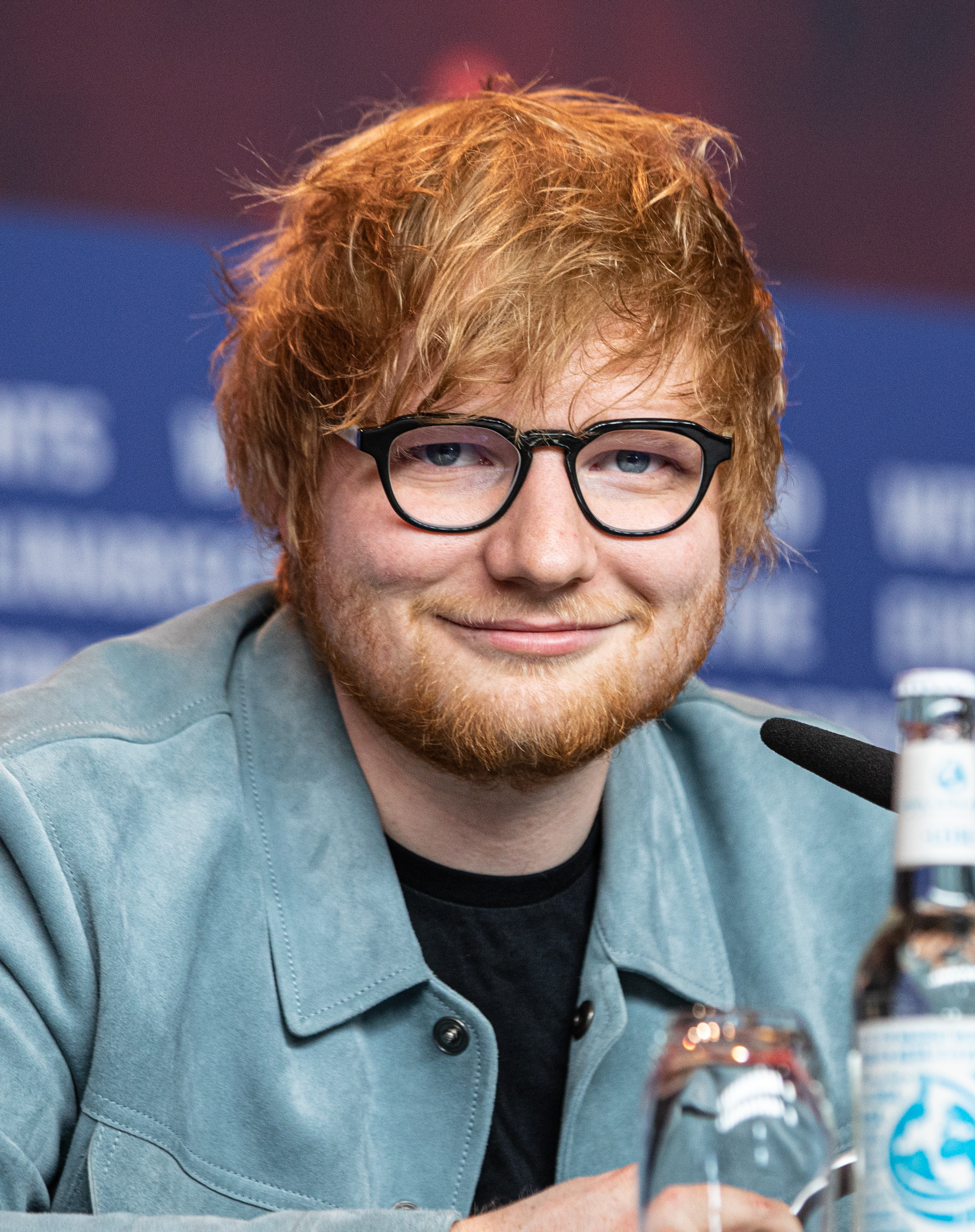
Marking the first collaboration with Ora, "Your Song" was written by Ed Sheeran and Steve Mac.

In June 2016, Ora signed a record contract with the British subsidiary label of Atlantic and embarked on the creation of her second studio album as a follow-up to Ora (2012). After teasing "Your Song" on social media in May 2017, the singer announced the official release date for the song on 26 May. The song was written by Steve Mac and Ed Sheeran, with the production completed by Mac. Ora highlighted her collaboration with Mac and Sheeran, referring to them as "some of the most talented songwriters of our time". She further commented, "Ed and I have been friends since our teens. It's brilliant to have the opportunity to collaborate with him for my first single–we definitely click creatively." The song was released for digital download and streaming in various countries by Atlantic on the scheduled date as the lead single from Phoenix (2018).

Running for three minutes, "Your Song" was created in the key of B-flat Minor and time signature of common time with a tempo 118 beats per minute. It is a Caribbean-inspired and minimalistic, bouncy electro-pop, and fresh as well as summerish pop love song. Celebrating a whirlwind romance during the lyrics, Ora is overwhelmed with feelings of joy as she longs to share her emotions to the world, all thanks to the happiness her boyfriend brings into her life. She conveys her feelings by singing lines such as, "I only wanna hear love songs/ I found my heart up in this place tonight/ Don't wanna sing mad songs anymore/ Only wanna sing your song/ 'Cause your song's got me feeling like I'm in love."

== Critical reception ==
Following its release, "Your Song" earned critical acclaim from music critics. Describing it as "joyous", Will Butler from NME complimented both the song's music and lyrics. Douglas Greenwood for the corresponding magazine acknowledged it as "such a modest comeback single that feels so refreshing in an age of proudly confrontational, 'fuck you' pop penned for women". Jason Lipshutz of Billboard commented that Ora exuded confidence and viewed the song to be "light, great" and "well-designed". Ludovic Hunter-Tilney from the Financial Times labelled it a "charming, fleet-footed romantic pop". Haydon Benfield for Renowned for Sound highlighted Ora's vocals and collaborative effort with Mac and Sheeran, who according to him "craft[ed] for her a light and spacious track to showcase her lightly smoked, soulful vocals". Alexandra Pollard of The Independent characterised the song as a "less is more" ethos and responded to it "a minimalist flirtation between drum pad and vocals". Julian Baldsing from The Line of Best Fit observed that it "again captures what's now become Rita's new calling card of emotionally apprehensive pop blasts".

Raul Guillen for Jenesaispop designated the song as Ora's own "Shape of You" (2017) and acknowledged the song's potential to become a hit. Lewis Corner of Gay Times detected the song "tapped into [the] streaming's insatiable appetite for a pop earworm", which is "embellished with glowing electronics [and] the sheer elation of being love into a chewy melody". In a mixed review, Jon Pareles from The New York Times perceived the song to blend Ora's "chesty presence" with the "clinical precision of synth-pop" and further wrote that it "is manufactured passion, assessing its own effects". Robert Loss for PopMatters compared the song's riff to a generic cell phone ringtone, saying, "It doesn't get more synthesized with 'lived experience' than that." In reviewing Phoenix, Malvika Padin from Clash regarded the song and the album's other singles, such as "Lonely Together" (2017) and "For You" (2018), to "leave you reaching for the replay button despite having heard them before". Neil Z. Yeung from AllMusic identified the song as well as "For You" and "Let You Love Me" (2018) as the "purest pop moments" on the album.

== Commercial performance ==
In the United Kingdom, "Your Song" peaked at number 13 on the UK Singles Chart on 8 June 2017 and reached its summit at number seven in the issue dated 13 July, as Ora's second most successful song after "Anywhere" (2017). In May 2020, the song received a double platinum certification from the British Phonographic Industry (BPI) for shifting more than 1,400,000 units in the UK. In Australia, it reached number 12 on the ARIA Singles Chart and number 16 on the New Zealand Singles Chart in New Zealand. Between 2017 and 2022, "Your Song" garnered a triple platinum certification from the Recorded Music New Zealand (RMNZ) in New Zealand and a quintuple platinum award from the Australian Recording Industry Association (ARIA) in Australia for selling than 90,000 and 350,000 units, respectively. In Canada, the song reached number 68 on the Canadian Hot 100 in the issue dated 22 July 2017, having spent a total of 12 weeks on the ranking. In April 2018, it received a platinum certification from Music Canada (MC) for shifting more than 80,000 units in the Canada. In the United States, "Your Song" peaked atop the Billboard Dance Club Songs chart and reached number 23 on the Bubbling Under Hot 100 on 26 August 2017. In March 2019, the song garnered a gold certification from the Recording Industry Association of America (RIAA) in the US for selling more than 500,000 units.

Elsewhere, "Your Song" reached the top 10 in Austria, the Flanders region of Belgium, Ireland and Scotland. Other top 50 positions were achieved in Croatia, Czech Republic, Denmark, Finland, France, Germany, Hungary, Netherlands, Norway, Poland, Portugal, Slovakia, Spain, Sweden, Switzerland and the Wallonia region of Belgium. Furthermore, the song peaked at number four on the Billboard Euro Digital Song Sales ranking, having spent a total of 17 weeks on the chart. It received a gold certification in Austria, Portugal and Sweden as well as a triple gold award from the Bundesverband Musikindustrie in Germany. The song garnered a platinum certification in Belgium, Brazil, Denmark, France, Italy, Netherlands and Switzerland. Additionally, it received a double platinum award from IFPI Norway in Norway and from the Polish Society of the Phonographic Industry (ZPAV) in Poland for shifting more than 120,000 and 100,000 units, respectively.

== Music video and promotion ==
Screenshot from the music video of "Your Song", displaying Rita Ora and her love interest in the background.

The accompanying music video was filmed in Vancouver, Canada, and uploaded to Ora's YouTube channel on 22 June 2017. Directed by Michael Haussman, the video showcases Ora in a boardroom meeting where she surprises her colleagues by dancing on the table and walking away. Behind-the-scenes footage from different stages of filming was released on the platform on 28 June 2017. The music video begins with Ora standing against a skyline on the beach with a man by her side whom she appears to be enamored with. The scene then shifts to a boardroom where Ora is seated at the head of a conference table, surrounded by a group of tattooed men who remain silent throughout the meeting. As she reminisces about the previous night, Ora dances and walks through the office building, gradually removing her clothes until she arrives at the parking lot. Then, she gets into a red BMW E30 M3 and drives in reverse through London back in time to the moment when she was with her man earlier that day.

Four remixes of "Your Song", including a rendition by American disc jockey trio Cheat Codes and Dutch disc jockey Sick Individuals, accompanied the single's release between July and September 2017. A day prior to the official release, Ora performed the song for the first time during an amfAR charity gala at the Cannes Film Festival on 25 May 2017. The singer reprised the performance for BBC Radio 1's Big Weekend in Hull, England, on 28 May. She proceeded to present the song on several talk shows, including Quotidien on 30 June, The Tonight Show Starring Jimmy Fallon on 18 July and The Ellen DeGeneres Show on 3 October. Ora continued to perform the song at the Teen Choice Awards on 13 August, the MTV Europe Music Awards on 12 November, the Bambi Awards on 16 November and at the Echo Music Prize on 12 April 2018.

== Track listing ==
- Digital download and streaming
1. "Your Song" – 3:00
- Digital download and streaming
1. "Your Song" (Acoustic) – 3:01
- Digital download and streaming
1. "Your Song" featuring Burna Boy (TeamSalut Remix) – 4:00
- Digital download and streaming
1. "Your Song" (Cheat Codes Remix) – 3:35
- Digital download and streaming
1. "Your Song" (Disciples Remix) – 5:34
- Digital download and streaming
1. "Your Song" (Sick Individuals Remix) – 3:24

== Charts ==
=== Weekly charts ===
Weekly chart performance for "Your Song"
Chart (2017)	Peak position
Australia (ARIA)	12
Austria (Ö3 Austria Top 40)	10
Belgium (Ultratop 50 Flanders)	6
Belgium (Ultratop 50 Wallonia)	17
Canada Hot 100 (Billboard)	68
Croatia (HRT)	5
Czech Republic Airplay (ČNS IFPI)	22
Czech Republic Singles Digital (ČNS IFPI)	16
Denmark (Tracklisten)	19
Euro Digital Song Sales (Billboard)	4
Finland (Suomen virallinen lista)	30
France (SNEP)	48
Germany (GfK)	13
Hungary (Rádiós Top 40)	11
Hungary (Single Top 40)	29
Hungary (Stream Top 40)	15
Ireland (IRMA)	8
Italy (FIMI)	68
Luxembourg Digital Songs (Billboard)	7
Mexico Ingles Airplay (Billboard)	12
Netherlands (Dutch Top 40)	18
Netherlands (Single Top 100)	28
New Zealand (Recorded Music NZ)	16
Norway (VG-lista)	27
Poland Airplay (ZPAV)	16
Portugal (AFP)	50
Scottish Singles Sales (Official Charts)	4
Slovakia Airplay (ČNS IFPI)	11
Slovakia Singles Digital (ČNS IFPI)	12
Spain (Promusicae)	40
Sweden (Sverigetopplistan)	24
Switzerland (Schweizer Hitparade)	13
UK Singles (Official Charts)	7
US Bubbling Under Hot 100 (Billboard)	23
US Dance Club Songs (Billboard)	1

=== Year-end charts ===
Year-end chart performance for "Your Song"
Chart (2017)	Position
Australia (ARIA)	44
Austria (Ö3 Austria Top 40)	34
Belgium (Ultratop Flanders)	28
Belgium (Ultratop Wallonia)	73
Denmark (Tracklisten)	71
Germany (Official German Charts)	27
Hungary (Rádiós Top 100)	58
Hungary (Stream Top 100)	49
Netherlands (Dutch Top 40)	65
Netherlands (Single Top 100)	65
Sweden (Sverigetopplistan)	84
Switzerland (Schweizer Hitparade)	48
UK Singles (OCC)	31
US Dance Club Songs (Billboard)	5

== Certifications ==
Certifications and sales for "Your Song"
Region	Certification	Certified units/sales
Australia (ARIA)	5× Platinum	350,000^{‡}
Austria (IFPI Austria)	Gold	15,000^{‡}
Belgium (BRMA)	Platinum	20,000^{‡}
Brazil (Pro-Música Brasil)	Platinum	60,000^{‡}
Canada (Music Canada)	Platinum	80,000^{‡}
Denmark (IFPI Danmark)	Platinum	90,000^{‡}
France (SNEP)	Platinum	200,000^{‡}
Germany (BVMI)	3× Gold	600,000^{‡}
Italy (FIMI)	Platinum	50,000^{‡}
Netherlands (NVPI)	Platinum	40,000^{‡}
New Zealand (RMNZ)	3× Platinum	90,000^{‡}
Norway (IFPI Norway)	2× Platinum	120,000^{‡}
Poland (ZPAV)	2× Platinum	100,000^{‡}
Portugal (AFP)	Gold	5,000^{‡}
Spain (Promusicae)	Gold	30,000^{‡}
Sweden (GLF)	Gold	20,000^{‡}
Switzerland (IFPI Switzerland)	Platinum	20,000^{‡}
United Kingdom (BPI)	2× Platinum	1,400,000
United States (RIAA)	Gold	500,000^{‡}
^{‡} Sales+streaming figures based on certification alone.

== Release history ==
Release dates and formats for "Your Song"
Region	Date	Format(s)	Label	Ref.
Various	26 May 2017	Digital download; streaming	Atlantic	
United States	11 June 2017	Contemporary hit radio	Atlantic	
Italy	16 June 2017	Radio airplay	Warner	

== See also ==
- List of Billboard Dance Club Songs number ones of 2017
- List of UK top-ten singles in 2017
