= Virgin EMI Records =

British record label

- Parent company: Universal Music Group
- Founded: March 2013; 13 years ago
- Defunct: 16 June 2020; 6 years ago
- Status: Separated into relaunches of EMI Records and Virgin Records
- Distributors: Self-released (UK); Republic Records (US); Def Jam Recordings (US); Capitol Records (US); Virgin Records America (US); UMe (reissues)
- Country of origin: United Kingdom
- Location: London, England
- Official website: emirecords.com

Virgin EMI Records was a British record label owned by the Universal Music Group that was formed in 2013. In June 2020, the label became dormant and replaced with the relaunch of labels EMI Records and Virgin Records, with the latter functioning as a subsidiary of the former.

== History ==
Virgin EMI Records was founded in March 2013 through the merger of Mercury Records UK and Virgin Records. It operated two distinct A&R and marketing streams—Virgin and EMI Records. Virgin EMI became one of Universal Music UK's front-line labels, alongside Polydor Records, Island Records, Decca Records, and a newly established Capitol Records UK. Mercury Records UK, which traditionally released International Island and Def Jam artists in the UK will now operate as an imprint under Virgin EMI along with Universal Island, which also released Republic Records artists in that country The new label will replace Mercury and Virgin as the releasing label in the UK, for Def Jam and Island US's international roster as well as Virgin Records America artists.

On 16 June 2020, Virgin EMI Records became dormant and replaced by the relaunches of Virgin Records and EMI Records, with Rebecca Allen (former president of UMG's Decca label) named as the latter label's president. Virgin Records will operate as an imprint of EMI Records. At the same time, EMI Records began handling its back catalogue to this day.

However, the 2006 Virgin logo as in Virgin EMI Records was later reused by Virgin Records in 2022.

== Artists ==
Virgin EMI's artists include Carrie Underwood, Taylor Swift, Florence and the Machine, Lewis Capaldi, Katy Perry, Emeli Sande, Ruth Lorenzo, the Chemical Brothers, Jamiroquai, the Libertines, Fall Out Boy, Lorde, Chase & Status, Metallica, Avicii, Elton John, Tion Wayne, Chvrches, Paul McCartney, Bastille, Blossoms, Loyle Carner, Martin Solveig, Bon Jovi, Harris J, the Vamps, George Michael, Devo, the Stone Roses, HRVY, Vic Mensa, Massive Attack, Avenged Sevenfold, Paul Simon, Krept and Konan, Amy Macdonald, Duke Dumont, Kanye West, Westlife, Konirata and Four of Diamonds. Furthermore, Mike Oldfield, whose Tubular Bells album launched the original Virgin Records, is also a Virgin EMI artist.
