= Only Want You (Rita Ora song) =

Single by Rita Ora featuring 6lack

from the album Phoenix
- Released: 1 March 2019
- Studio: Westlake (Los Angeles); Gold Tooth (Beverly Hills); SARM Studios (London, UK); Mastering Place (New York)
- Genre: Electropop
- Length: 3:00 (album version); 3:12 (single version)
- Label: Atlantic
- Songwriter(s): Alexandra Tamposi; Andrew Wotman; Emily Warren; Louis Bell; Carl Rosen
- Producer(s): watt; Louis Bell

Rita Ora singles chronology
"Let You Love Me" (2018)	"Only Want You" (2019)	"R.I.P." (2019)

6lack singles chronology
"Waves" (2018)	"Only Want You" (2019)	"It's Not U It's Me" (2019)

Music video
- "Rita Ora - Only Want You (feat. 6LACK) [Official Video]" on YouTube

"Only Want You" is a song by British singer Rita Ora featured on her second studio album Phoenix (2018). A remixed version, featuring American singer 6lack, was released on 1 March 2019 as the fifth and final single from the album. The song initially charted in the UK in November 2018, following the release of the album. After being released as a single, the song reached a new peak of number sixty in 2019.

== Background ==
Ora confirmed the song's release as a single in February 2019, through Twitter, saying the song would be released in a version featuring a "special guest", later revealed to be American singer 6lack.

In an interview, Ora said "Only Want You" was one of her favourite tracks on Phoenix, calling it "really intense" with "that incredible Nirvana guitar. I think those elements were super important for me to bring into this album. And at the same time, it has a killer beat." Idolator wrote that the track seemed like an obvious choice for the next single, saying that it was "singled out in reviews and became an instant fan favorite".

== Charts ==
Chart performance for "Only Want You"
Chart (2018–2019)	Peak position
Croatia (HRT)	52
Czech Republic (Rádio – Top 100)	20
Ireland (IRMA)	59
Netherlands (Tipparade)	14
New Zealand Hot Singles (RMNZ)	10
Scotland (OCC)	43
Sweden Heatseeker (Sverigetopplistan)	16
UK Singles (OCC)	60
US Pop Digital Songs (Billboard)	22

== Certifications ==
Region	Certification	Certified units/sales
Brazil (Pro-Música Brasil)	Gold	20,000^{‡}
Denmark (IFPI Danmark)	Gold	45,000^{‡}
New Zealand (RMNZ)	Gold	15,000^{‡}
Poland (ZPAV)	Gold	25,000^{‡}
United Kingdom (BPI)	Silver	200,000^{‡}
^{‡} Sales+streaming figures based on certification alone.
