= MTV Presents: Varna Beach =

Music festival in Bulgaria

- Genre: Electronic music, Pop, Hip-hop, Rapcore, Alternative rock
- Dates: July
- Locations: Varna, Bulgaria (since 2017)
- Years active: 2017–2018
- Website: mtvvarnabeach.com

MTV Presents: Varna Beach was a music festival organized by MTV Europe, which is part of Viacom Media Networks. The first edition of the event took place on July 15, 2017 on the South Beach in Varna, Bulgaria, and welcomed international performers such as Bebe Rexha, Tinie Tempah, Jonas Blue, Gorgon City and local artists including Poli Genova, Kristian Kostov and Dara.
