= For You (Liam Payne and Rita Ora song) =

2018 single by Liam Payne and Rita Ora

Single by Liam Payne and Rita Ora

from the album Fifty Shades Freed: Original Motion Picture Soundtrack
- Released: 5 January 2018
- Recorded: 2017
- Genre: Synth-pop; electropop
- Length: 4:04
- Label: Universal Studios; Republic
- Songwriters: Ali Payami; Ali Tamposi; Andrew Wotman
- Producers: Ali Payami; Watt; Peter Karlsson

Liam Payne singles chronology
| "Bedroom Floor" (2017) | "For You" (2018) | "Familiar" (2018) |

Rita Ora singles chronology
| "Anywhere" (2017) | "For You" (2018) | "Girls" (2018) |

Music video
- "For You" on YouTube

"For You" is a song recorded by British singers Liam Payne and Rita Ora for the soundtrack to the film Fifty Shades Freed (2018). It was released on 5 January 2018 through Universal Studios and Republic Records as the lead single from the soundtrack. The music video was released on 26 January 2018. The song was also included on Ora's second studio album, Phoenix (2018) and Payne's debut studio album, LP1 (2019).

"For You" reached the top ten in the United Kingdom, France, Norway, Switzerland, Austria, Portugal, Poland, and Belgium, and peaked at number one in Germany. The track uses samples from "Ten Seconds Before Sunrise" by Tiësto.

== Promotion ==
On 20 December 2017, both artists posted a promotional shot on social media of themselves standing together, dressed up to the nines, along with the hashtag "#FiftyShadesFreed". The picture started speculation on a possible collaboration between the two for the upcoming film Fifty Shades Freed, in which Ora appears. A day after, the pair released the first teaser of the song on social media. On 3 January 2018, they revealed the song's release date and released the second teaser, a video showing the studio session in which they recorded the song.

== Critical reception ==
Lauren O'Neill of Vice called it "a fine song with a serviceable chorus". He disliked Payne's appearance on the track and wrote that it would be "entirely better if Rita, whose voice sounds very pretty here, had been left to her own devices". Patrick Hosken of MTV News wrote that "the song's opening blares immediately reminded me of Celine Dion's "My Heart Will Go On". Sam Damshenas of Gay Times deemed the song "a sultry synthpop duet" that is "catchy as f**k". He expect the song to be "a smash hit", considering how well the previous singles from Fifty Shades soundtrack albums have done. Kevin Goddard of HotNewHipHop described the song as "a sultry, steamy, upbeat and pop-driven dance record".

Rap-Up opined that the duet "combines upbeat harmonies with catchy melodies". Michelle Phi of Clevver wrote that "the upbeat dance tempo and sultry lyrics are the perfect combo to get any fan excited about the final installment of Fifty Shades of Grey" and the song "could be the steamiest song to grace the franchise yet". Similarly, Mike Vulpo of E! also regarded the song as "an upbeat dance number that may just get fans more pumped for the steamy movie hitting theatres before Valentine's Day".

Kate Solomon of The Guardian defined the song "weeping, surprising, romantic and brilliant", writing that although "Liam Payne has found himself on a good song for the first time since 'Steal My Girl'", his contribution is only "one verse and Ora does the rest".

== Chart performance ==
"For You" peaked at number one in Germany, making it Payne and Ora's first song to top the chart in the country. The song charted within the top five in the charts of Austria, France, Portugal, and Switzerland. The single also reached the top 10 in the UK, peaking at number eight, making it Payne's second top 10 in the country as a solo artist and Ora's twelfth.

Following Payne's death in October 2024, the song saw a surge in sales and streams. The Official Charts Company showed "For You" place at number 67 on the UK Midweek Singles Chart. It entered the UK Singles Chart Top 100, on 25 October 2024, at number 43.

== Music video ==
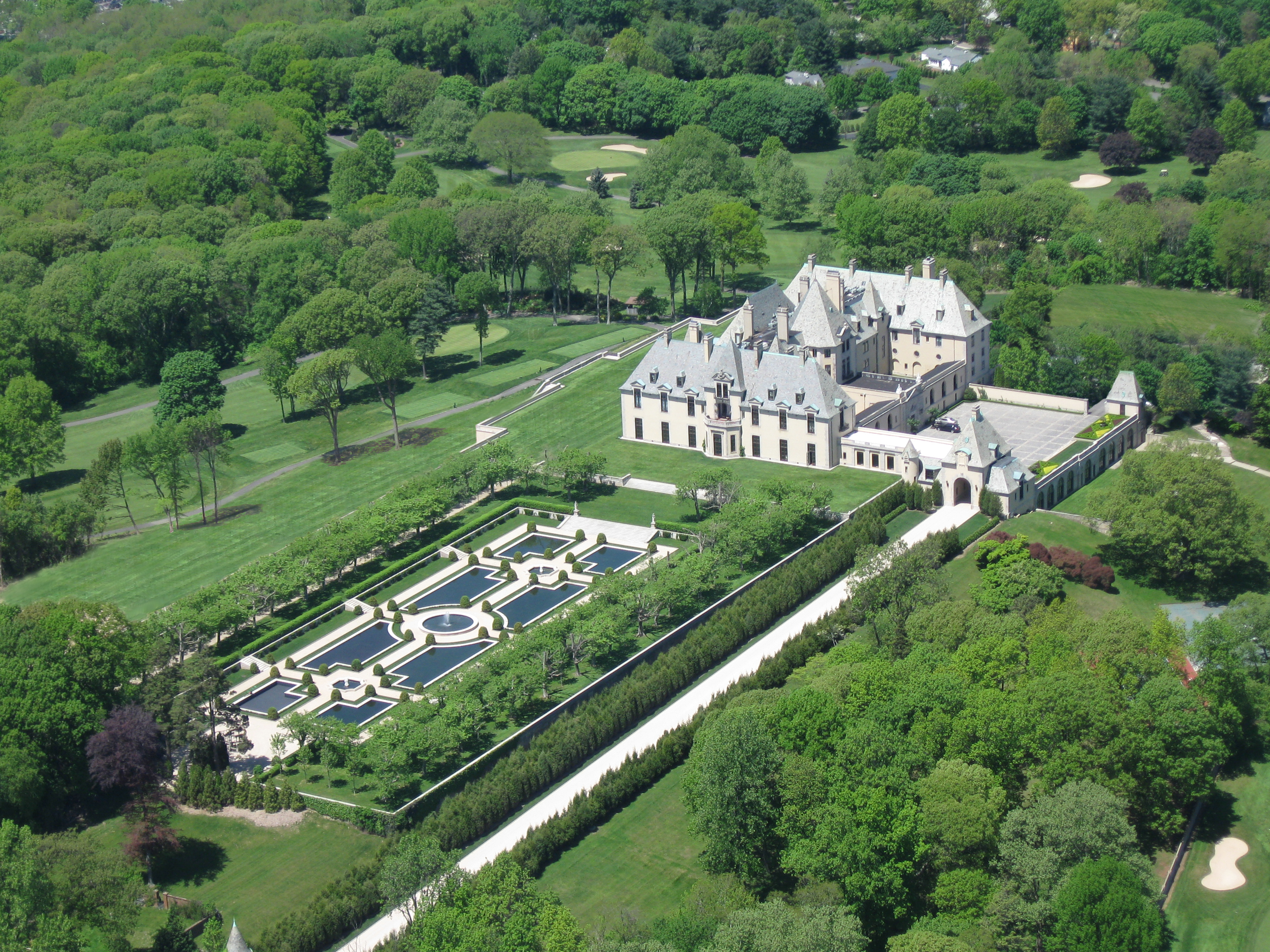
The video was shot at Oheka Castle in Huntington, New York.

The official music video of the song was released on 26 January 2018 on the Fifty Shades Vevo account. It was directed by Hannah Lux Davis. The filming took place at Oheka Castle on Long Island, off the coast of the eastern United States. It features Ora in a red dress walking and running in the garden and Payne in the castle, with them meeting on the grand staircase at the end. Special effects throughout also show the pair levitating. Comparisons were drawn to the video of "Blank Space" by Taylor Swift, as both videos were filmed in the same location.

== Live performances ==
On 31 January 2018, Payne and Ora performed "For You" on The Tonight Show Starring Jimmy Fallon. They also sang on Today on 1 February, and on the French television show C à vous on 5 February. The duo also performed the song at the 2018 Brit Awards on 21 February 2018. On 12 April 2018, Payne and Ora performed the song live after Ora performed "Your Song" and "Anywhere" at the German Echo Music Prize. On 18 April 2020, Payne and Ora performed the song at One World: Together at Home.

== Credits and personnel ==
Credits adapted from Tidal.

- Liam Payne – vocals, background vocals
- Rita Ora – vocals, background vocals
- Ali Payami – songwriting, production, background vocals, keyboard, bass, drums, horn, percussion, programming
- Ali Tamposi – songwriting, background vocals
- Andrew Watt – songwriting, production, background vocals, guitar
- Peter Karlsson – production, background vocals
- John Hanes – mix engineering
- Sam Holland – engineering
- Serban Ghenea – mixing
- Jakob Jerlström – background vocals
- Max Grahn – background vocals
- Cory Bice – assistant engineering
- Jeremy Lertola – assistant engineering
- Niklas Ljungfelt – guitar

== Charts ==
=== Weekly charts ===
| Chart (2018–2020) | Peak position |
|---|---|
| Australia (ARIA) | 15 |
| Austria (Ö3 Austria Top 40) | 4 |
| Belgium (Ultratop 50 Flanders) | 8 |
| Belgium (Ultratop 50 Wallonia) | 14 |
| Bulgaria Airplay (PROPHON) | 3 |
| Canada Hot 100 (Billboard) | 63 |
| CIS Airplay (TopHit) | 63 |
| Colombia (National-Report) | 71 |
| Croatia International Airplay (HRT) | 1 |
| Czech Republic Airplay (ČNS IFPI) | 1 |
| Czech Republic Singles Digital (ČNS IFPI) | 2 |
| Denmark (Tracklisten) | 17 |
| Europe (Euro Digital Songs) | 1 |
| Finland (Suomen virallinen lista) | 13 |
| France (SNEP) | 33 |
| Germany (GfK) | 1 |
| Greece Digital Songs (Billboard) | 6 |
| Hungary (Rádiós Top 40) | 26 |
| Hungary (Single Top 40) | 3 |
| Hungary (Stream Top 40) | 16 |
| Ireland (IRMA) | 17 |
| Italy (FIMI) | 31 |
| Luxembourg Digital Songs (Billboard) | 2 |
| Lebanon (Lebanese Top 20) | 1 |
| Mexico Airplay (Billboard) | 20 |
| Netherlands (Dutch Top 40) | 21 |
| Netherlands (Mega Top 50) | 15 |
| Netherlands (Single Top 100) | 35 |
| New Zealand (Recorded Music NZ) | 34 |
| Norway (VG-lista) | 10 |
| Poland Airplay (ZPAV) | 3 |
| Portugal (AFP) | 3 |
| Russia Airplay (TopHit) | 124 |
| Scottish Singles Sales (Official Charts) | 2 |
| Slovakia Airplay (ČNS IFPI) | 11 |
| Slovakia Singles Digital (ČNS IFPI) | 2 |
| Slovenia (SloTop50) | 3 |
| Spain (Promusicae) | 47 |
| Sweden (Sverigetopplistan) | 15 |
| Switzerland (Schweizer Hitparade) | 3 |
| Ukraine Airplay (TopHit) | 193 |
| UK Singles (Official Charts) | 8 |
| US Billboard Hot 100 | 76 |
| US Pop Airplay (Billboard) | 37 |

2023 Weekly chart performance for "For You"
| Chart (2023) | Peak position |
|---|---|
| Estonia Airplay (TopHit) | 164 |

| Chart (2024) | Peak position |
|---|---|
| UK Singles (Official Charts) | 43 |

=== Year-end charts ===
| Chart (2018) | Position |
|---|---|
| Australia (ARIA) | 87 |
| Austria (Ö3 Austria Top 40) | 64 |
| Belgium (Ultratop Flanders) | 38 |
| Belgium (Ultratop Wallonia) | 81 |
| Bulgaria (PROPHON) | 5 |
| France (SNEP) | 124 |
| Germany (Official German Charts) | 37 |
| Hungary (Rádiós Top 40) | 60 |
| Hungary (Single Top 40) | 24 |
| Iceland (Plötutíóindi) | 40 |
| Netherlands (Dutch Top 40) | 79 |
| Poland (ZPAV) | 17 |
| Portugal (AFP) | 50 |
| Romania (Airplay 100) | 72 |
| Slovenia (SloTop50) | 12 |
| Switzerland (Schweizer Hitparade) | 35 |
| UK Singles (Official Charts Company) | 75 |

== Certifications ==
| Region | Certification | Certified units/sales |
|---|---|---|
| Australia (ARIA) | 2× Platinum | 140,000^{‡} |
| Austria (IFPI Austria) | Gold | 15,000^{‡} |
| Belgium (BRMA) | Gold | 10,000^{‡} |
| Brazil (Pro-Música Brasil) | Diamond | 160,000^{‡} |
| Canada (Music Canada) | Platinum | 80,000^{‡} |
| Denmark (IFPI Danmark) | Platinum | 90,000^{‡} |
| France (SNEP) | Gold | 100,000^{‡} |
| Germany (BVMI) | Platinum | 400,000^{‡} |
| Italy (FIMI) | Platinum | 50,000^{‡} |
| New Zealand (RMNZ) | Platinum | 30,000^{‡} |
| Norway (IFPI Norway) | Platinum | 60,000^{‡} |
| Poland (ZPAV) | 2× Platinum | 40,000^{‡} |
| Portugal (AFP) | Gold | 5,000^{‡} |
| Spain (Promusicae) | Gold | 30,000^{‡} |
| Sweden (GLF) | Gold | 4,000,000^{†} |
| United Kingdom (BPI) | Platinum | 600,000^{‡} |
^{‡} Sales+streaming figures based on certification alone.^{†} Streaming-only figures based on certification alone.

== Release history ==
| Region | Date | Format | Label | Ref. |
|---|---|---|---|---|
| Various | 5 January 2018 | Digital download | Universal Studios; Republic | |
| United States | 9 January 2018 | Contemporary hit radio | Republic | |
| Italy | 12 January 2018 | Contemporary hit radio | Universal | |
| United Kingdom | 12 January 2018 | Contemporary hit radio | Universal | |

== See also ==
- List of number-one hits of 2018 (Germany)
- List of number-one songs of 2018 (Lebanon)
- List of number-one songs of the 2010s (Czech Republic)
