= Girls (Rita Ora song) =

Single by Rita Ora featuring Cardi B, Bebe Rexha and Charli XCX

from the album Phoenix
- Released: 11 May 2018
- Genre: Pop
- Length: 3:41
- Label: Atlantic
- Composers: Ben Diehl; Jonny Coffer; Andrew Wotman
- Lyricists: Rita Ora; Brian D. Lee; Ali Tamposi; Jordan Thorpe
- Producers: Andrew Watt; Jonny Coffer; Ben Billions

Rita Ora singles chronology
"For You" (2018)	"Girls" (2018)	"Let You Love Me" (2018)

Cardi B singles chronology
"Be Careful" (2018)	"Girls" (2018)	"Dinero" (2018)

Bebe Rexha singles chronology
"Push Back" (2018)	"Girls" (2018)	"I'm a Mess" (2018)

Charli XCX singles chronology
"Out of My Head" (2017)	"Girls" (2018)	"5 in the Morning" (2018)

Music video
- "Girls" on YouTube

"Girls" is a song by British singer Rita Ora featuring American rapper Cardi B, American singer Bebe Rexha and British singer Charli XCX. It was released on 11 May 2018 by Atlantic Records as the third single from Ora's second studio album, Phoenix (2018). It was written by the former three as well as Klenord Raphael, Ali Tamposi, Pardison Fontaine, Brian Lee, and producers Jonny Coffer, Watt, and Ben Billions.

== Background ==
The collaboration was announced on 4 May 2018. Rita Ora described the song as an "empowering anthem":

"These past few years I've been so inspired by all the strong women I've seen who aren't afraid to be themselves. For those who aren't afraid to rule the world, this is our anthem. A celebration of love. And of course, thank you to all the fellow boss women who so kindly graced this song with me — each representing who they are and where they are from [...]"

In an interview with People, Ora revealed that the song was inspired by Katy Perry's "I Kissed a Girl", which she described as: "just such a statement; it was so fun". During an instagram live in September of 2018, Cardi B mentioned that while recording this song Bebe Rexha often tried to make sexual advancements towards her.

"That fat [REDACTED] lesbian kept trying to get me to take my pants off. One time she asked me if I wanted mcdonalds, and I said yes because it was my cheat day. She proceeded to pull her pants down, and reveal that she had a mcchicken shoved up her [REDACTED] and told me to 'come and get it.' I am telling you bardigang, she shoved a whole mcchicken up her [REDACTED] I honestly don't like this song anymore because its connected to those memories."

== Composition ==
"Girls" is a pop song that comprises a hip hop-influenced beat, with lyrics exploring themes of same-sex attraction.

== Music video ==
The music video for "Girls" was released on 6 June 2018. It was directed by Helmi.

== Live performances ==
Ora performed the song live for the first time at BBC Radio 1's Big Weekend on 28 May 2017, with Charli XCX and Raye, one year before its release as an official single. Her first televised performance was on the season 13 finale of Germany's Next Topmodel on 24 May 2018.

== Reception ==
American singers Hayley Kiyoko and Kehlani, both of whom identify as lesbians, criticized the song for being "harmful" to the LGBTQ community. Kiyoko referred to the song in a tweet she posted as being "tone-deaf", stating that the song "fueled the male gaze while marginalizing the idea of women loving women." Kehlani voiced her opinion in a series of tweets, "I have an incredible song out with one of the artists, and would love to work with the other three as well. I have met them all and respect them. There. Were. Harmful. Lyrics." She concluded her tweets with: "Every artist on the song is fantastic, and very much loved and supported by me... by all of us. But this isn't about talent, it's about choice."

In 2019, Billboard included the song in its list of the "30 Lesbian Love Songs".

=== Singers' responses to backlash ===
Ora responded to criticism, as she wrote: "'Girls' was written to represent my truth and is an accurate account of a very real and honest experience in my life... I have had romantic relationships with women and men throughout my life and this is my personal journey". Nonetheless, she apologized following the controversy.

Cardi B insisted on Twitter that she and the others "never [tried] to cause harm or had bad intentions with the song", referencing her own bisexuality and prior experiences with women. Charli XCX stated in an interview with Rolling Stone that she had read the criticisms, including Kiyoko and Kehlani's posts, regarding the song's lyrics, continuing: "... the intention of the song was never to hurt anybody. None of the artists on this song would ever want to upset or hurt anyone." She further mentioned that she wants to "learn from this experience" and hoped to continue dialogue without upsetting queer communities.

Rexha opted for a more defensive response, telling Entertainment Weekly, "My sexual life is nobody's business... but we're singing a song about kissing girls and that remains true to who I am. It's the life that I live and it's honest to me." She went on to say "People automatically went for the negative instead of saying: 'Well maybe these girls do kiss girls, maybe Bebe is bi.' You don't know about my sexual orientation, so I felt disrespected."

== Track listing ==
- Digital download
1. "Girls" (featuring Cardi B, Bebe Rexha and Charli XCX) – 3:41
- Digital download
1. "Girls" (featuring Cardi B, Bebe Rexha and Charli XCX) (Martin Jensen Remix) – 4:20
- Digital download
1. "Girls" (featuring Cardi B, Bebe Rexha and Charli XCX) (Steve Aoki Remix) – 3:45

== Charts ==
Chart performance for "Girls"
Chart (2018)	Peak position
Australia (ARIA)	52
Austria (Ö3 Austria Top 40)	62
Belgium (Ultratip Bubbling Under Flanders)	33
Belgium (Ultratip Bubbling Under Wallonia)	1
Canada Hot 100 (Billboard)	72
Croatia Airplay (HRT)	24
Czech Republic Singles Digital (ČNS IFPI)	59
Europe (Euro Digital Songs)	20
France (SNEP Sales Chart)	138
Germany (GfK)	69
Greece Digital Singles (IFPI Greece)	33
Hungary (Single Top 40)	38
Hungary (Stream Top 40)	37
Ireland (IRMA)	26
Mexico Ingles Airplay (Billboard)	42
Netherlands (Dutch Top 40)	19
Netherlands (Single Top 100)	73
New Zealand Heatseekers (RMNZ)	1
Poland Airplay (ZPAV)	27
Portugal (AFP)	72
Romania (Airplay 100)	50
Scottish Singles Sales (Official Charts)	15
Slovakia Singles Digital (ČNS IFPI)	31
Spain Digital Songs (PROMUSICAE)	42
Sweden (Sverigetopplistan)	66
Switzerland (Schweizer Hitparade)	54
UK Singles (Official Charts)	22
UK Hip Hop/R&B (Official Charts)	11
US Bubbling Under Hot 100 (Billboard)	3
US Dance Club Songs (Billboard)	6
US Pop Digital Songs (Billboard)	14

== Certifications ==
Region	Certification	Certified units/sales
Australia (ARIA)	Gold	35,000^{‡}
Brazil (Pro-Música Brasil)	2× Platinum	80,000^{‡}
New Zealand (RMNZ)	Gold	15,000^{‡}
Norway (IFPI Norway)	Gold	30,000^{‡}
Poland (ZPAV)	Gold	10,000^{‡}
United Kingdom (BPI)	Gold	400,000^{‡}
^{‡} Sales+streaming figures based on certification alone.

== Release history ==
Region	Date	Format	Version	Label	Ref.
Various	11 May 2018	Digital download; streaming	Original	Atlantic	
Italy	11 May 2018	Contemporary hit radio	Original	Warner	
United States	22 May 2018	Rhythmic contemporary radio	Original	Warner Bros.; Atlantic	
United Kingdom	8 June 2018	Digital download	Steve Aoki Remix	Atlantic	
United Kingdom	15 June 2018	Digital download	Martin Jensen Remix	Atlantic	
