= Lonely Together (Avicii song) =

Single by Avicii featuring Rita Ora

from the EP Avīci (01)
- Released: 11 August 2017
- Genre: Progressive house; tropical house; dance-pop; R&B; Electropop
- Length: 3:01
- Label: Avicii; Geffen
- Songwriters: Benjamin Levin; Ali Tamposi; Tim Bergling; Brian Lee; Magnus August Høiberg; Andrew Wotman
- Producers: Benny Blanco; Andrew Watt; Cashmere Cat; Avicii

Avicii singles chronology
"Without You" (2017)	"Lonely Together" (2017)	"SOS" (2019)

Rita Ora singles chronology
"Your Song" (2017)	"Lonely Together" (2017)	"Anywhere" (2017)

Music video
- "Lonely Together" on YouTube

"Lonely Together" is a song by Swedish DJ Avicii featuring British singer Rita Ora. The song was released on 11 August 2017 as the second single from Avicii's EP, Avīci (01). A remix EP was released on 17 November 2017. "Lonely Together" was the last single Avicii released during his lifetime, before his death in 2018. The song was later included on Ora's second studio album, Phoenix (2018).

== Live performances ==
Ora performed "Lonely Together" at 538 Koningsdag festival in the Netherlands, a week after Avicii's death. She dedicated her performance to the DJ and held a moment of silence. On 27 May, at BBC's Biggest Weekend, she also paid tribute to Avicii.

== Music video ==
The music video of the song was directed by Levan Tsikurishvili, who directed Avicii biographical documentary Avicii: True Stories. Oren Soffer served as cinematographer. At the 2018 MTV Video Music Awards the video was nominated for Best Visual Effects and won for Best Dance Video.

== Track listings ==
Digital download

1. "Lonely Together" (featuring Rita Ora) – 3:01

Digital download – acoustic

1. "Lonely Together" (featuring Rita Ora) (acoustic) – 3:01

Digital download – remixes

1. "Lonely Together" (featuring Rita Ora) (Alan Walker remix) – 2:59
2. "Lonely Together" (featuring Rita Ora) (DJ Licious remix) – 3:04
3. "Lonely Together" (featuring Rita Ora) (Jaded remix) – 3:36
4. "Lonely Together" (featuring Rita Ora) (Dexter remix) – 3:03

== Charts ==
=== Weekly charts ===
Chart (2017–18)	Peak position
Australia (ARIA)	32
Australia Dance (ARIA)	2
Austria (Ö3 Austria Top 40)	18
Belgium (Ultratop 50 Flanders)	36
Belgium Dance (Ultratop Flanders)	3
Belgium (Ultratop 50 Wallonia)	46
Belgium Dance (Ultratop Wallonia)	11
Canada Hot 100 (Billboard)	55
Croatia International Airplay (Top lista)	25
Czech Republic Airplay (ČNS IFPI)	10
Czech Republic Singles Digital (ČNS IFPI)	8
Denmark (Tracklisten)	38
Euro Digital Songs (Billboard)	8
France (SNEP)	58
Germany (GfK)	24
Greece International (IFPI)	94
Hungary (Dance Top 40)	9
Hungary (Rádiós Top 40)	3
Hungary (Single Top 40)	3
Hungary (Stream Top 40)	5
Ireland (IRMA)	5
Italy (FIMI)	44
Latvia (DigiTop100)	19
Lebanon Airplay (Lebanese Top 20)	10
Mexico Ingles Airplay (Billboard)	13
Netherlands (Dutch Top 40)	24
Netherlands (Single Top 100)	22
New Zealand (Recorded Music NZ)	34
Norway (VG-lista)	10
Philippines (Philippine Hot 100)	55
Poland Airplay (ZPAV)	4
Portugal (AFP)	30
Romania (Romanian Airplay 100)	56
Scottish Singles Sales (Official Charts)	1
Serbia Airplay (Radiomonitor)	3
Slovakia Airplay (ČNS IFPI)	92
Slovakia Singles Digital (ČNS IFPI)	9
Slovenia (SloTop50)	32
Spain (Promusicae)	63
Sweden (Sverigetopplistan)	3
Switzerland (Schweizer Hitparade)	22
UK Singles (Official Charts)	4
UK Dance (Official Charts)	1
US Bubbling Under Hot 100 (Billboard)	18
US Hot Dance/Electronic Songs (Billboard)	11
Venezuela (Monitor Latino Anglo)	10

=== Year-end charts ===
Chart (2017)	Position
Hungary (Stream Top 40)	36
Sweden (Sverigetopplistan)	45
UK Singles (Official Charts Company)	77
US Hot Dance/Electronic Songs (Billboard)	43
Chart (2018)	Position
Hungary (Dance Top 40)	28
Hungary (Rádiós Top 40)	20
Hungary (Single Top 40)	64
Portugal (AFP)	167
Sweden (Sverigetopplistan)	26
US Hot Dance/Electronic Songs (Billboard)	42

== Certifications ==
Region	Certification	Certified units/sales
Belgium (BRMA)	Gold	10,000^{‡}
Brazil (Pro-Música Brasil)	2× Platinum	120,000^{‡}
Canada (Music Canada)	Platinum	80,000^{‡}
Denmark (IFPI Danmark)	Platinum	90,000^{‡}
France (SNEP)	Platinum	200,000^{‡}
Germany (BVMI)	Platinum	400,000^{‡}
Italy (FIMI)	Platinum	50,000^{‡}
New Zealand (RMNZ)	2× Platinum	60,000^{‡}
Norway (IFPI Norway)	2× Platinum	120,000^{‡}
Poland (ZPAV)	Gold	25,000^{‡}
Portugal (AFP)	Platinum	10,000^{‡}
Spain (Promusicae)	Platinum	60,000^{‡}
United Kingdom (BPI)	2× Platinum	1,200,000^{‡}
United States (RIAA)	Platinum	1,000,000^{‡}
^{‡} Sales+streaming figures based on certification alone.

== Release history ==
Region	Date	Format	Version	Label	Ref.
Various	11 August 2017	Digital download	Original	PRMD; Interscope	
Various	27 October 2017	Digital download	Acoustic	PRMD; Interscope	
United States	31 October 2017	Top 40 radio	Original	Interscope	
Various	17 November 2017	Digital download	Remixes EP	PRMD; Interscope	
Italy	15 December 2017	Contemporary hit radio	Original	Universal	
