= Anywhere (Rita Ora song) =

Single by Rita Ora

from the album Phoenix
- Released: 20 October 2017
- Recorded: 2017
- Studio: Deep Cuts (Los Angeles, California); KBK (Stockholm, Sweden)
- Genre: Dance-pop; electropop; power pop
- Length: 3:35
- Label: Atlantic UK
- Songwriters: Rita Sahatçiu Ora; Nolan Lambroza; Alexandra Tamposi; Alessandro Lindblad; Nicholas Gale; Andrew Wotman; Brian Lee
- Producers: Alesso; Andrew Watt; Sir Nolan

Rita Ora singles chronology
"Lonely Together" (2017)	"Anywhere" (2017)	"For You" (2018)

Music video
- "Anywhere" on YouTube

"Anywhere" is a song by the British singer Rita Ora from her second studio album, Phoenix (2018). The song was written by Ora, Ali Tamposi, Brian Lee, Nick Gale and its producers Alesso, Watt and Sir Nolan. It was released as a single on 20 October 2017 through Atlantic Records UK. A wistful, dance-pop and electropop love song about escapism, it features a breakdown of stuttering vocal loops. The song has received positive reviews from music critics, and it was chosen as The Guardian's track of the week.

Commercially, the song reached the top-10 in 15 countries, including Ireland, Netherlands, Poland, Switzerland and the United Kingdom where it peaked at number two, becoming Ora's eleventh UK top-10 single. "Anywhere" has since been certified double platinum by the British Phonographic Industry (BPI). An accompanying music video, directed by Declan Whitebloom, shows Ora in various locations throughout New York City. Ora performed the song at the 2017 MTV Europe Music Awards.

== Background and release ==
Ora said that the story behind the song came from Avicii's single "Lonely Together" (2017), which she featured on, as both were "cut from the same cloth", being developed from a similar guitar line by some of the songwriters who worked with her on "Anywhere". Ora co-wrote "Anywhere" with Ali Tamposi, Andrew Watt, Brian Lee, Alesso, Digital Farm Animals and Sir Nolan. The core of the track was written in Los Angeles in early 2017 and stemmed from the initial hook, "Take me anywhere, anywhere away from here", which then became "...anywhere away with you". It was inspired by Ora wanting to go on a road trip with her friends to escape Los Angeles.

"Anywhere" was first made available for pre-order on 13 October 2017. The song was released by Atlantic Records UK as the album's second single on 20 October 2017. The same day, Ora appeared on The Radio 1 Breakfast Show as a host alongside Nick Grimshaw to premiere "Anywhere". Remixes by R3hab and Willy William were released on 24 November 2017. The following day, "Anywhere" was promoted with its own filter on Snapchat.

== Composition and lyrics ==
"Anywhere"
An 18-second sample of the song featuring the transition to the second chorus breakdown.

Musically, "Anywhere" is a wistful, dance-pop, electropop, and power pop song. Featuring dream-like production, the track has a firm electronic beat which acts as a metronome for Ora's vocal. Having a moderate tempo of 107 beats per minute, the song is written in the key of B minor and follows the chord progression of Em–A–D–Bm in the first refrain. Instrumentation is provided by keyboards and guitar. The song has two refrains; the first begins with Ora singing "Over the hills and far away, a million miles from L.A, just anywhere away with you," while the second is a breakdown of stuttering vocal loops. Interviewed about the song in November 2017, Ora said, "I actually have no idea what I'm saying... My voice was just chopped up, so I actually am not saying anything."

As interpreted by the singer, "Anywhere" is a love song about escapism and "having a desperation of wanting to break free from whatever it is you're going through". Ora also felt the song's message of breaking free was relevant to what British citizens had experienced in 2017. Andrew R. Chow of The New York Times wrote that the lyrics are driven by wanderlust. Due to the processed vocal loops, the second chorus is lyrically inaudible and has no meaning. Ora said lyrics to it can be made up.

== Reception ==
=== Critical reception ===
"Anywhere" was chosen by The Guardian as their track of the week. Journalist Peter Robinson deemed the song a "well-judged electropop romp" and "the modern answer" to ABBA's "Super Trouper" (1980), adding that it "sounds like something that sparks minor online controversy when it only comes third in Sweden's annual Eurovision heats – and Melodifestivalen followers will know there is no higher compliment". Laurence Day of The Line of Best Fit regarded it as "a glittering return". Rolling Stone's Sarah Grant opined that unlike on "Lonely Together", Ora "sounds refreshingly unadorned". A critic from The Observer wrote, "Pensive, poised and ludicrously catchy, Rita Ora continues her patient rebirth with this delicate banger." Writing for Billboard magazine, Jon Ali called "Anywhere" Ora's "finest single to date", noting, "it sounds like Rita's finally found her footing in the pop musical landscape, and it's on the dancefloor".

== Commercial performance ==
The song debuted at number 20 on the UK Singles Chart on 27 October 2017, selling 16,085 units in its first week. In its fourth week, the song reached number two with sales of 38,159 units. "Anywhere" became Ora's 11th top-10 song in the United Kingdom and her third of 2017 (following "Your Song" and "Lonely Together"). The song has been certified double platinum by the British Phonographic Industry (BPI). The song topped the chart in Scotland, marking Ora's fifth chart-topper and 11th top-ten song in the country. "Anywhere" peaked at number three on the Euro Digital Song Sales chart, becoming Ora's ninth top-10 song on the chart. "Anywhere" reached the top-10 in Bulgaria, Croatia, Hungary, Ireland, Luxembourg, Netherlands, Poland, Romania, Slovakia, Slovenia and Switzerland.

In Australia, the song peaked at number 14 on the ARIA Charts and was subsequently certified triple platinum by the Australian Recording Industry Association (ARIA). Furthermore, "Anywhere" reached the top 20 in Austria, Belgium, Germany and Russia. In the United States, "Anywhere" reached number six on the Dance Club Songs chart, and marked Ora's sixth top-10 song on the chart. The song topped the Mexico Ingles Airplay chart for five weeks.

== Music video ==
Directed by Declan Whitebloom, the music video for "Anywhere" was filmed over 14 hours in New York City on 5 October 2017. The video was produced by Randy Bobbit for Black Dog Films and commissioned by Dan Curwin. Most of Ora's jewellery and footwear in the visual were designed by Alexis Bittar and Sophia Webster, respectively. One of the scenes see Ora dancing in a restaurant that remained open while the video was being filmed. The video personifies the song's message of romantic escapism although a love interest is absent. It finds Ora dancing and singing in nine different high fashion ensembles in various locations. The music video premiered on YouTube at 12:00 GMT on 20 October 2017.

Ora wearing an Off-White blue velveteen coatdress in a scene filmed at the Meatpacking District, Manhattan.

It begins with Ora singing at Times Square, wearing a half-and-half Halpern Fall 2017 collection piece and large square earrings by Bittar. She is then shown on a hotel rooftop overlooking the Hudson River in a Tezenis black bodysuit, a red coat from Vaquera The Handmaid's Tale Collection and Double Disco earrings. Other segments take place at a shop, restaurant, hair salon and in the streets of the Meatpacking District and Chinatown, Manhattan.

In the next scene, Ora holds blue balloons while walking through traffic and on sidewalks, sporting a matching blue velveteen coatdress and knee-high boots from Off White's Fall 2017 collection. The singer is also shown on a moving carriage in an Attico multi-patterned halter gown, Colin LoCascio red faux-fur coat and Saint Laurent Niki Swarovski crystal-embellished leather knee-high boots. In other scenes, she has hip hop-style looks including a Mulberry jumpsuit, a black Paco Rabanne top and bottom, and a Madeleine Thompson rainbow cashmere tracksuit with a pink bucket hat by Kangol and Marc Jacobs. In a scene near the end of the video, Ora runs in a street in a vintage Vivienne Westwood wedding dress, Gigi Burris veil and Mulberry boots.

MTV UK's Sam Prance regarded it among Ora's best videos, writing, "From the incredible outfits to the setting and the carefree vibe, it's a total joy to watch". Ross McNeilage from the same publication described it as "super-fun" and "like a high-fashion Rita in Wonderland".

== Live performances ==
Ora's first televised performance of "Anywhere" was on The Jonathan Ross Show on 21 October 2017. The following day, she performed the song in a medley with "Your Song" and "Lonely Together" at the 2017 BBC Radio 1 Teen Awards. On 5 November 2017, Ora performed "Anywhere" on The X Factor UK. She performed a medley of "Anywhere" and "Your Song" at the 2017 MTV Europe Music Awards on 12 November, and at Germany's 2017 Bambi Awards on 16 November. Ora also performed "Anywhere" on the Children in Need 2017 telethon on 18 November, Australian breakfast programme Sunrise on 22 November, and Sounds Like Friday Night on 1 December. She performed an acoustic version of "Anywhere" alongside a cover of the Wham! classic "Last Christmas" on Radio 1's Live Lounge on 11 December.

On 21 February 2018, Ora performed "Anywhere" live during a medley, with "Your Song" and "For You" with Liam Payne, at the Brit Awards 2018. On 12 April 2018, she performed the song live during a similar medley at the German Echo Music Prize.

== Track listings ==
- Digital download
1. "Anywhere" – 3:35
- Digital download (R3hab Remix)
1. "Anywhere" (R3hab Remix) – 2:54
- Digital download (Willy William Remix)
1. "Anywhere" (Willy William Remix) – 3:33

== Credits and personnel ==
Credits adapted from Tidal.

- Rita Ora – composition, vocals
- Ali Tamposi – composition, backing vocals
- Alesso – composition, production, keyboard, programming
- Watt – composition, production, backing vocals, keyboard, guitar, programming, vocal production
- Nolan Lambroza – composition, production, keyboard, instruments, programming
- Nicholas Gale – composition
- Brian Lee – composition
- John Hanes – mix engineering
- Dave Kutch – master engineering
- Daniel Zaidenstadt – engineering
- Serban Ghenea – mixing

== Charts ==
=== Weekly charts ===
Weekly chart performance for "Anywhere"
Chart (2017–2018)	Peak position
Australia (ARIA)	14
Austria (Ö3 Austria Top 40)	18
Belarus Airplay (Eurofest)	2
Belgium (Ultratop 50 Flanders)	17
Belgium (Ultratop 50 Wallonia)	13
Bulgaria Airplay (PROPHON)	7
CIS Airplay (TopHit)	7
Colombia (National-Report)	23
Croatia International Airplay (Top lista)	3
Czech Republic Airplay (ČNS IFPI)	66
Czech Republic Singles Digital (ČNS IFPI)	31
Denmark (Tracklisten)	25
Ecuador (National-Report)	93
Euro Digital Song Sales (Billboard)	3
Finland (Suomen virallinen striimatuimmat)	39
France (SNEP)	109
Germany (GfK)	18
Hungary (Rádiós Top 40)	7
Hungary (Single Top 40)	3
Hungary (Stream Top 40)	18
Ireland (IRMA)	4
Israel International Airplay (Media Forest)	2
Latvia (DigiTop100)	37
Luxembourg Digital Song Sales (Billboard)	9
Mexico Airplay (Billboard)	3
Netherlands (Dutch Top 40)	7
Netherlands (Mega Top 50)	4
Netherlands (Single Top 100)	20
New Zealand (Recorded Music NZ)	23
Poland Airplay (ZPAV)	1
Portugal (AFP)	54
Romania (Airplay 100)	9
Russia Airplay (TopHit)	11
Scottish Singles Sales (Official Charts)	1
Slovakia Airplay (ČNS IFPI)	1
Slovakia Singles Digital (ČNS IFPI)	28
Slovenia (SloTop50)	6
Spain (Promusicae)	64
Sweden (Sverigetopplistan)	47
Switzerland (Schweizer Hitparade)	7
UK Singles (Official Charts)	2
Ukraine Airplay (TopHit)	88
US Dance Club Songs (Billboard)	6
Venezuela (National-Report)	35

=== Year-end charts ===
Year-end chart performance for "Anywhere"
Chart (2017)	Position
Netherlands (Dutch Top 40)	91

Year-end chart performance for "Anywhere"
Chart (2018)	Position
Belgium (Ultratop Flanders)	58
Belgium (Ultratop Wallonia)	79
CIS (TopHit)	35
Denmark (Tracklisten)	99
Germany (Official German Charts)	68
Hungary (Rádiós Top 40)	26
Hungary (Single Top 40)	20
Iceland (Tónlistinn)	31
Netherlands (Dutch Top 40)	31
Netherlands (Single Top 100)	99
Poland (Polish Airplay Top 100)	3
Portugal (AFP)	135
Romania (Airplay 100)	61
Russia Airplay (TopHit)	46
Slovenia (SloTop50)	13
Switzerland (Schweizer Hitparade)	42
UK Singles (OCC)	49
Ukraine Airplay (TopHit)	146

== Certifications and sales ==
Certifications and sales for "Anywhere"
Region	Certification	Certified units/sales
Australia (ARIA)	3× Platinum	210,000^{‡}
Austria (IFPI Austria)	Gold	15,000^{‡}
Belgium (BRMA)	Gold	10,000^{‡}
Brazil (Pro-Música Brasil)	Platinum	60,000^{‡}
Canada (Music Canada)	Gold	40,000^{‡}
Denmark (IFPI Danmark)	Platinum	90,000^{‡}
France (SNEP)	Gold	100,000^{‡}
Germany (BVMI)	Gold	200,000^{‡}
Italy (FIMI)	Gold	25,000^{‡}
Netherlands (NVPI)	Platinum	40,000^{‡}
New Zealand (RMNZ)	2× Platinum	60,000^{‡}
Norway (IFPI Norway)	Platinum	60,000^{‡}
Poland (ZPAV)	Diamond	100,000^{‡}
Portugal (AFP)	Gold	5,000^{‡}
Spain (Promusicae)	Platinum	60,000^{‡}
Switzerland (IFPI Switzerland)	Platinum	20,000^{‡}
United Kingdom (BPI)	2× Platinum	1,500,000
^{‡} Sales+streaming figures based on certification alone.

== See also ==
- List of number-one songs of 2018 (Mexico)
- List of number-one singles of 2018 (Poland)
