= Let You Love Me =

- Cover art for Möwe remix

Single by Rita Ora

from the album Phoenix
- Released: 21 September 2018
- Studio: Ten87 (London, United Kingdom); Kensaltown (London, United Kingdom)
- Genre: Electropop
- Length: 3:10
- Label: Atlantic UK
- Songwriters: Rita Sahatçiu Ora; Fred Gibson; Jonnali Parmenius; Linus Wiklund; Ilsey Juber; Finn Keane
- Producers: Easyfun; Fred again..

Rita Ora singles chronology
"Girls" (2018)	"Let You Love Me" (2018)	"Only Want You" (2019)

Music video
- "Let You Love Me" on YouTube

"Let You Love Me" is a song by the British singer Rita Ora from her second studio album, Phoenix (2018). The song was written by Ora, Ilsey Juber, Noonie Bao, Linus Wiklund, Fred Gibson and Finn Keane, and produced by the last two. It was released on 21 September 2018, by Atlantic Records UK, as the album's fourth single. Musically, "Let You Love Me" has been labeled as an electropop track.

The song reached the top-ten in twenty countries, including Australia, Belgium, Ireland, Netherlands and the United Kingdom. "Let You Love Me" became Ora's thirteenth song to reach the UK top-ten, thus breaking the record for the most top ten songs by a British female solo artist. Ora performed the song on Jimmy Kimmel Live! and Victoria's Secret Fashion Show.

== Background and composition ==
On 9 September 2018, in a backstage interview with the BBC, prior to her performance at Radio 2 Live in Hyde Park, Ora shared the title of the song and revealed that it would be released at the end of the month. On 18 September 2018, Ora announced that "Let You Love Me" was going to be released as a single on 21 September and that her second studio album, Phoenix, was set for release on 23 November. "Let You Love Me" was released by Atlantic Records UK as the fourth single from the album.

Ora co-wrote "Let You Love Me" with Ilsey Juber, Linus Wiklund, Noonie Bao, Fred Gibson and Finn Keane. Musically, it has been described as an electropop song.

== Commercial performance ==
"Let You Love Me" debuted at number 14 on the UK Singles Chart on 28 September 2018. The song reached number four in its eight-week on the chart. "Let You Love Me" became Ora's 13th song to reach the UK top-ten and broke the record for most top-ten songs by a British female solo artist. The record was previously jointly held by Shirley Bassey and Petula Clark. The song has been certified double platinum by the British Phonographic Industry (BPI). "Let You Love Me" charted at number two in Scotland.

Additionally, the song reached the top-ten in Belgium, Croatia, Estonia, Hungary, Ireland, Lithuania, Luxembourg, Netherlands, Poland Romania, Russia, Slovakia, Slovenia and Ukraine. The song peaked at number three on the Euro Digital Song Sales chart, becoming Ora's 11th top-ten song on the chart. "Let You Love Me" reached the top-20 in Austria, Czech Republic, Finland, Germany, New Zealand, Norway, Singapore, Sweden and Switzerland.

In Australia, "Let You Love Me" peaked at number eight on the ARIA Charts and was later certified quadruple platinum by the Australian Recording Industry Association (ARIA). The song peaked at number 12 on the US Pop Digital Songs chart and was certified gold by the Recording Industry Association of America (RIAA).

== Music video ==
The accompanying music video for "Let You Love Me" was filmed in London and directed by Malia James. The video was released on YouTube on 21 September 2018.

A video of an acoustic performance of the song was released on YouTube on 9 November 2018.

== Live performances ==
Ora performed "Let You Love Me" for the first time at the Gibraltar Music Festival on 22 September 2018. Her first televised performance of the song was on the 6 October episode of The Jonathan Ross Show. On 26 October, Ora performed the song in costume as Post Malone at KISS FM's Haunted House Party. She later performed it on the Strictly Come Dancing results show on 28 October.

Ora's first performance of the song in the US was at the People's Choice Awards, on 11 November. She performed an acoustic version of the song as part of BBC Radio 1's Live Lounge on 19 November. Ora performed the song on a float during the 2018 Macy's Thanksgiving Day Parade in New York City, on 22 November. She attracted criticism for lip syncing, a practice which is common during the parade, after there was an issue with the sound on her float, so it appeared that she was singing out of time with the song. She was praised for her recovery by fellow performers after the parade. Ora performed "Let You Love Me" at the 2018 ARIA Awards on 28 November. She later performed the song on Michael McIntyre's Big Show on 1 December, and at Victoria's Secret Fashion Show on 2 December. She also performed the song with a live band on Jimmy Kimmel Live!, on 5 December.

== Track listings ==
- Digital download
1. "Let You Love Me" – 3:10
- Digital download – Acoustic
1. "Let You Love Me" (Acoustic) – 3:09
- Digital download – Remixes
1. "Let You Love Me" (Möwe Remix) – 3:06
2. "Let You Love Me" (James Hype Remix) – 3:42

== Personnel ==
Credits adapted from Tidal.

- Fred Gibson – producer, backing vocals, drums, guitar, keyboards, programmer
- Finn Keane – producer, backing vocals, drums, keyboards, programmer
- Michael Freeman – assistant mix engineer
- Daniel Zaidenstadt – engineer
- Alex Gordon – mastering
- Mark "Spike" Stent – mixing

== Charts ==
=== Weekly charts ===
Weekly chart performance for "Let You Love Me"
Chart (2018–2019)	Peak position
Australia (ARIA)	8
Austria (Ö3 Austria Top 40)	16
Belarus Airplay (Eurofest)	9
Belgium (Ultratop 50 Flanders)	8
Belgium (Ultratop 50 Wallonia)	28
Canada Hot 100 (Billboard)	80
CIS Airplay (TopHit)	4
Croatia International Airplay (Top lista)	1
Czech Republic Airplay (ČNS IFPI)	21
Czech Republic Singles Digital (ČNS IFPI)	16
Denmark (Tracklisten)	33
Estonia (IFPI)	7
Euro Digital Songs (Billboard)	3
Finland (Suomen virallinen lista)	16
France (SNEP)	104
Germany (Airplay Chart)	1
Germany (GfK)	12
Greece International (IFPI)	13
Hungary (Rádiós Top 40)	7
Hungary (Single Top 40)	13
Hungary (Stream Top 40)	13
Ireland (IRMA)	4
Israel TV Airplay (Media Forest)	3
Italy (FIMI)	47
Lebanon Airplay (Lebanese Top 20)	4
Lithuania (AGATA)	5
Luxembourg Digital Songs (Billboard)	3
Mexico Ingles Airplay (Billboard)	4
Netherlands (Dutch Top 40)	5
Netherlands (Mega Top 50)	6
Netherlands (Single Top 100)	14
New Zealand (Recorded Music NZ)	19
Norway (VG-lista)	17
Poland Airplay (ZPAV)	1
Portugal (AFP)	34
Romania (Airplay 100)	5
Russia Airplay (TopHit)	6
Scottish Singles Sales (Official Charts)	2
Singapore (RIAS)	20
Slovakia Airplay (ČNS IFPI)	4
Slovakia Singles Digital (ČNS IFPI)	8
Slovenia (SloTop50)	2
Spain Digital Songs (PROMUSICAE)	37
Sweden (Sverigetopplistan)	17
Switzerland (Schweizer Hitparade)	11
Ukraine Airplay (TopHit)	1
UK Singles (Official Charts)	4
US Pop Airplay (Billboard)	33
US Pop Digital Songs (Billboard)	12
Venezuela (National-Report)	8

2024 weekly chart performance for "Let You Love Me"
Chart (2024)	Peak position
Moldova Airplay (TopHit)	83

=== Year-end charts ===
Year-end chart performance for "Let You Love Me"
Chart (2018)	Position
CIS (Tophit)	97
Hungary (Single Top 40)	72
Netherlands (Dutch Top 40)	41
Romania (Airplay 100)	90
Russia Airplay (Tophit)	115
Ukraine Airplay (Tophit)	80
UK Singles (Official Charts Company)	88

Year-end chart performance for "Let You Love Me"
Chart (2019)	Position
Australia (ARIA)	96
Belgium (Ultratop Flanders)	60
CIS (Tophit)	10
Croatia (HRT)	4
Iceland (Tónlistinn)	65
Netherlands (Dutch Top 40)	62
Poland (ZPAV)	95
Portugal (AFP)	185
Romania (Airplay 100)	75
Russia Airplay (Tophit)	31
Slovenia (SloTop50)	19
Switzerland (Schweizer Hitparade)	89
Ukraine Airplay (Tophit)	1
UK Singles (Official Charts Company)	96

== Certifications ==
Recording certifications for "Let You Love Me"
Region	Certification	Certified units/sales
Australia (ARIA)	4× Platinum	280,000^{‡}
Austria (IFPI Austria)	Gold	15,000^{‡}
Belgium (BRMA)	Gold	20,000^{‡}
Brazil (Pro-Música Brasil)	2× Platinum	80,000^{‡}
Denmark (IFPI Danmark)	Platinum	90,000^{‡}
France (SNEP)	Gold	100,000^{‡}
Germany (BVMI)	Gold	200,000^{‡}
Italy (FIMI)	Gold	25,000^{‡}
Netherlands (NVPI)	Platinum	80,000^{‡}
New Zealand (RMNZ)	2× Platinum	60,000^{‡}
Norway (IFPI Norway)	Platinum	60,000^{‡}
Poland (ZPAV)	Diamond	250,000^{‡}
Portugal (AFP)	Platinum	10,000^{‡}
Spain (Promusicae)	Gold	30,000^{‡}
Switzerland (IFPI Switzerland)	Gold	10,000^{‡}
United Kingdom (BPI)	2× Platinum	1,200,000^{‡}
United States (RIAA)	Gold	500,000^{‡}
^{‡} Sales+streaming figures based on certification alone.

== Release history ==
Release dates and formats for "Let You Love Me"
Region	Date	Format	Version	Label(s)	Ref.
Various	21 September 2018	Digital download; streaming	Original	Atlantic UK	
Italy	28 September 2018	Contemporary hit radio	Original	Warner	
Canada	1 October 2018	Contemporary hit radio	Original		
United States	16 October 2018	Contemporary hit radio	Original	Warner Bros.	
Various	19 October 2018	Digital download	Möwe Remix	Warner Bros.; Atlantic	
Various	9 November 2018	Digital download	Acoustic	Warner Bros.; Atlantic	
Various	9 November 2018	Streaming	James Hype Remix	Atlantic UK; Warner	

== See also ==
- List of number-one singles of 2018 (Poland)
- List of UK top-ten singles in 2018
- List of top 10 singles for 2018 in Australia
- List of Platinum singles in the United Kingdom awarded since 2000
