= Fatboy Slim discography =

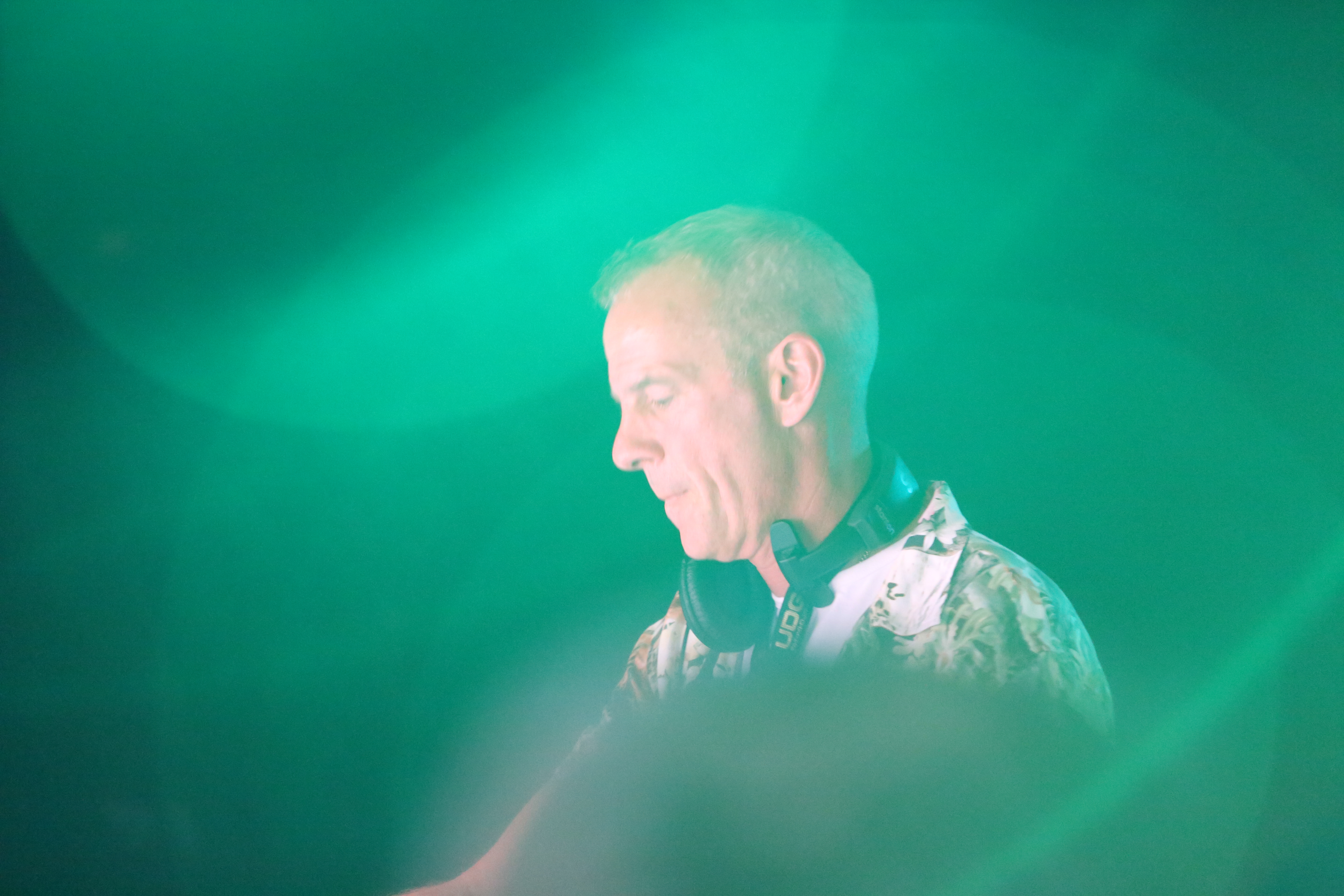
- Cook performing at the 2013 Glastonbury Festival
- Studio albums: 4
- Extended plays: 5
- Soundtrack albums: 1
- Live albums: 3
- Compilation albums: 2
- Singles: 28
- Video albums: 3
- Music videos: 31
- Remix albums: 3
- Mix albums: 6

The discography of Fatboy Slim, an alias of Norman Cook, an English DJ, big beat musician, and record producer, consists of four studio albums, three live albums, one soundtrack album, two compilation albums, three remix albums, six mix albums, three video albums, five extended plays, 28 singles (including one as a featured artist) and 31 music videos.

== Albums ==
=== Studio albums ===
List of albums, with selected chart positions and certifications
| Title | Album details | Peak chart positions | | | | | | | | | | Certifications |
| Title | Album details | UK | AUS | AUT | FRA | GER | IRL | NLD | NZ | SWI | US | Certifications |
|---|---|---|---|---|---|---|---|---|---|---|---|---|
| Better Living Through Chemistry | Released: 16 September 1996; Label: Skint; Formats: CD, cassette, LP | 69 | — | — | — | — | — | — | 50 | — | — | BPI: Gold |
| You've Come a Long Way, Baby | Released: 19 October 1998; Label: Skint; Formats: CD, cassette, LP | 1 | 2 | 13 | 10 | 15 | 19 | 27 | 1 | 23 | 34 | BPI: 4× Platinum; ARIA: 3× Platinum; IFPI SWI: Gold; NVPI: Gold; RIAA: Platinum; SNEP: Platinum |
| Halfway Between the Gutter and the Stars | Released: 6 November 2000; Label: Skint; Formats: CD, cassette, LP | 8 | 6 | 22 | 21 | 23 | 9 | 64 | 10 | 35 | 51 | BPI: Platinum; ARIA: Gold |
| Palookaville | Released: 4 October 2004; Label: Skint; Formats: CD, LP, digital download | 14 | 51 | 35 | 59 | 67 | 63 | 83 | 40 | 28 | 149 | BPI: Silver |
"—" denotes releases that did not chart or were not released in that territory.

=== Live albums ===
List of albums, with selected chart positions
| Title | Album details | Peak chart positions | | | | | | |
| Title | Album details | UK Comp. | AUS | FRA | GER | SWI | US | US Dance |
|---|---|---|---|---|---|---|---|---|
| On the Floor at the Boutique | Released: 25 August 1998; Label: Skint; Formats: CD, cassette | — | — | — | 59 | — | 173 | — |
| Live on Brighton Beach | Released: 25 February 2002; Label: Skint; Formats: CD, cassette | 19 | 27 | 103 | 87 | 64 | — | 9 |
| Big Beach Boutique II | Released: 7 October 2002; Label: Skint; Formats: CD, cassette | 11 | — | 150 | — | — | — | — |
"—" denotes releases that did not chart or were not released in that territory.

=== Soundtrack albums ===
List of albums, with selected chart positions
| Title | Album details | Peak chart positions | | | |
| Title | Album details | UK | IRL | NLD | US |
|---|---|---|---|---|---|
| Here Lies Love (with David Byrne) | Released: 5 April 2010; Label: Todomundo, Nonesuch; Formats: CD, LP, digital download | 76 | 93 | 83 | 96 |

=== Compilation albums ===
List of albums, with selected chart positions and certifications
| Title | Album details | Peak chart positions | | | | | | | | | Certifications |
| Title | Album details | UK | AUS | AUT | GER | IRL | NLD | NZ | SWI | US Dance | Certifications |
|---|---|---|---|---|---|---|---|---|---|---|---|
| The Greatest Hits – Why Try Harder | Released: 19 June 2006; Label: Skint; Formats: CD, digital download | 2 | 4 | 30 | 89 | 1 | 69 | 8 | 22 | 6 | BPI: Platinum; ARIA: Gold; RMNZ: Platinum |
| Best of the Bootlegs | Released: 14 March 2011; Label: Skint; Formats: CD, digital download | — | — | — | — | — | — | — | — | — | |
"—" denotes releases that did not chart or were not released in that territory.

=== Remix albums ===
List of albums, with selected chart positions
| Title | Album details | Peak chart positions |
| Title | Album details | US |
|---|---|---|
| Signature Series Volume 1 | Released: 15 February 2000; Label: BML Entertainment; Formats: CD, cassette | — |
| The Fatboy Slim/Norman Cook Collection | Released: 21 March 2000; Label: Hip-O; Formats: CD, cassette | 195 |
| The Greatest Hits – Remixed | Released: 24 September 2007; Label: Skint; Formats: CD, digital download | — |
| Fatboy Slim vs. Australia | Released: 19 January 2018; Label: Loaded, Skint; Formats: Digital download | — |
| Fatboy Slim vs. New Zealand | Released: 25 January 2019; Label: Skint; Formats: Digital download | — |
"—" denotes releases that did not chart or were not released in that territory.

=== Mix albums ===
List of albums, with selected chart positions
| Title | Album details | Peak chart positions |
| Title | Album details | AUS |
|---|---|---|
| Beat Up the NME | Released: 1997; Label: NME; Formats: Cassette | — |
| Bondi Beach: New Years Eve '06 | Released: December 2005; Label: Addictive; Formats: CD | — |
| Fala aí! | Released: 18 July 2006; Label: ST2; Formats: CD | — |
| Late Night Tales: Fatboy Slim | Released: 15 October 2007; Label: Late Night Tales; Formats: CD, digital download | — |
| Dance Bitch | Released: 2 March 2009; Label: Liberator Music; Formats: CD, digital download | 42 |
| The Legend Returns | Released: June 2010; Label: Mixmag; Formats: CD | — |
| Fatboy Slim Presents Bem Brasil | Released: 30 May 2014; Label: Decca; Formats: CD, digital download | — |
"—" denotes releases that did not chart or were not released in that territory.

=== Video albums ===
List of video albums
| Title | Album details |
|---|---|
| The Greatest Hits – Why Make Videos | Released: 19 June 2006; Label: Skint; Formats: DVD-V, UMD |
| Big Beach Boutique II – The Movie | Released: 29 October 2006; Label: Capitol; Formats: DVD |
| Incredible Adventures in Brazil | Released: 4 March 2008; Label: ST2; Formats: DVD |

== Extended plays ==
List of extended plays
| Title | Details |
|---|---|
| Halfway Between the Gutter and the Guardian | Released: 2001; Label: Skint; Formats: CD |
| My Game | Released: November 2002; Label: Skint; Formats: CD |
| Illuminati | Released: 19 November 2002; Label: Skint; Formats: CD |
| Camber Sands | Released: 19 November 2002; Label: Skint; Formats: CD |
| The Pimp | Released: 19 November 2002; Label: Skint; Formats: CD |

== Singles ==
=== As lead artist ===
List of singles, with selected chart positions and certifications, showing year released and album name
| Title | Year | Peak chart positions | | | | | | | | | | Certifications | Album |
| Title | Year | UK | AUS | AUT | FRA | GER | IRL | NLD | NZ | SWI | US | Certifications | Album |
|---|---|---|---|---|---|---|---|---|---|---|---|---|---|
| "Santa Cruz" | 1995 | — | — | — | — | — | — | — | — | — | — | | Better Living Through Chemistry |
| "Everybody Needs a 303" | 1996 | 191 | — | — | — | — | — | — | — | — | — | | Better Living Through Chemistry |
| "Punk to Funk" | 1996 | 177 | — | — | — | — | — | — | — | — | — | | Better Living Through Chemistry |
| "Going Out of My Head" | 1997 | 57 | — | — | — | — | — | — | — | — | — | | Better Living Through Chemistry |
| "Everybody Needs a 303" (re-issue) | 1997 | 34 | — | — | — | — | — | — | — | — | — | | Better Living Through Chemistry |
| "The Rockafeller Skank" | 1998 | 6 | 32 | 23 | 69 | 28 | 15 | 45 | 17 | 24 | 76 | BPI: Platinum; RMNZ: Platinum | You've Come a Long Way, Baby |
| "Gangster Trippin" | 1998 | 3 | 75 | — | — | 98 | 17 | 68 | 32 | 49 | — | BPI: Silver | You've Come a Long Way, Baby |
| "Praise You" | 1999 | 1 | 28 | 31 | — | 55 | 6 | 46 | 11 | 44 | 36 | BPI: 2× Platinum; RMNZ: 3× Platinum | You've Come a Long Way, Baby |
| "Right Here, Right Now" | 1999 | 2 | 28 | — | 56 | 47 | 13 | 56 | 25 | — | — | BPI: 2× Platinum; RMNZ: Platinum | You've Come a Long Way, Baby |
| "Build It Up – Tear It Down" | 1999 | — | — | — | — | — | — | — | — | — | — | | You've Come a Long Way, Baby |
| "Sunset (Bird of Prey)" | 2000 | 9 | 63 | — | 97 | 80 | 25 | 91 | 49 | 77 | — | | Halfway Between the Gutter and the Stars |
| "Demons" (featuring Macy Gray) | 2001 | 16 | 78 | — | — | — | 43 | 78 | — | — | — | | Halfway Between the Gutter and the Stars |
| "Star 69" / "Weapon of Choice" | 2001 | 10 | 23 | — | — | 81 | 21 | 85 | — | — | — | BPI: Silver; RMNZ: Gold | Halfway Between the Gutter and the Stars |
| "Ya Mama" / "Song for Shelter" | 2001 | 30 | 59 | — | — | — | — | — | — | — | — | | Halfway Between the Gutter and the Stars |
| "Slash Dot Dash" | 2004 | 12 | — | — | — | — | — | — | — | — | — | | Palookaville |
| "Wonderful Night" | 2004 | 51 | — | — | — | — | — | — | — | — | — | | Palookaville |
| "The Joker" | 2005 | 32 | — | — | — | 63 | 29 | — | — | 99 | — | | Palookaville |
| "Don't Let the Man Get You Down" | 2005 | 153 | — | — | — | — | — | — | — | — | — | | Palookaville |
| "That Old Pair of Jeans" | 2006 | 39 | — | — | — | — | 31 | — | — | — | — | | The Greatest Hits – Why Try Harder |
| "Champion Sound" | 2006 | 88 | — | — | — | — | — | — | — | — | — | | The Greatest Hits – Why Try Harder |
| "Radioactivity" | 2007 | — | — | — | — | — | — | — | — | — | — | | Late Night Tales: Fatboy Slim |
| "Please Don't" (with David Byrne featuring Santigold) | 2010 | — | — | — | — | — | — | — | — | — | — | | Here Lies Love |
| "Machines Can Do the Work" (with Hervé) | 2010 | — | — | — | — | — | — | — | — | — | — | | Non-album singles |
| "Eat, Sleep, Rave, Repeat" (with Riva Starr, featuring Beardyman) | 2013 | 3 | 47 | — | 96 | — | 18 | 2 | — | — | — | BPI: Silver | Non-album singles |
| "Where U Iz" | 2017 | — | — | — | — | — | — | — | — | — | — | | Non-album singles |
| "Boom F**king Boom" (featuring Beardyman) | 2017 | — | — | — | — | — | — | — | — | — | — | | Non-album singles |
| "All the Ladies" (with Eats Everything) | 2020 | — | — | — | — | — | — | — | — | — | — | | Non-album singles |
| "Speed Trials on Acid" (with Carl Cox, featuring Dan Diamond) | 2022 | — | — | — | — | — | — | — | — | — | — | | Electronic Generations |
| "Role Model" (featuring Dan Diamond and Luca Guerrieri) | 2024 | — | — | — | — | — | — | — | — | — | — | | TBA |
| "Bus Stop Please" (featuring Daniel Steinberg) | 2024 | — | — | — | — | — | — | — | — | — | — | | TBA |
| "Satisfaction Skank" (with The Rolling Stones) | 2025 | — (Note: "Satisfaction Skank" did not enter the UK Singles Chart, but debuted at number 8 on the UK Singles Downloads Chart.) | — | — | — | — | — | — | — (Note: "Satisfaction Skank" did not enter the NZ Top 40 Singles Chart, but peaked at number 22 on the NZ Hot Singles Chart.) | — | — | | Non-album single |
"—" denotes releases that did not chart or were not released in that territory.

=== As featured artist ===
List of singles, with selected chart positions, showing year released and album name
| Title | Year | Peak chart positions | Album |
| Title | Year | UK | Album |
|---|---|---|---|
| "Badder Badder Schwing" (Freddy Fresh featuring Fatboy Slim) | 1999 | 34 | The Last True Family Man |
| "Bristol to Brighton" (Eats Everything featuring Fatboy Slim) | 2022 | — | Non-album single |
| "Praising You" (Rita Ora featuring Fatboy Slim) | 2023 | — (Note: "Praising You" did not enter the UK Singles Top 100, but peaked at number 13 on the Official UK Singles Downloads Chart Top 100.) | You & I |
"—" denotes releases that did not chart or were not released in that territory.

== Music videos ==
=== As lead artist ===
List of music videos, showing year released and director
| Title | Year | Director(s) |
|---|---|---|
| "Santa Cruz" | 1997 | James Hyman |
| "Going out of My Head" | 1997 | Doug Aitken |
| "Everybody Needs a 303" (version 1) | 1997 | Ron Kurtz |
| "Everybody Needs a 303" (version 2) | 1997 | David Slade |
| "Everybody Needs a 303" (Remix – Everybody Loves a Carnival) | 1997 | Ashley Slater, Tim Day |
| "The Rockafeller Skank" (version 1) | 1998 | Spike Jonze |
| "The Rockafeller Skank" (version 2) | 1998 | Doug Aitken |
| "Gangster Trippin" | 1998 | Roman Coppola |
| "Build It Up – Tear It Down" | 1998 | Patrick Tichy |
| "Praise You" | 1998 | Spike Jonze & Roman Coppola (credited to "Torrance Public Film Productions") |
| "Right Here, Right Now" | 1999 | Hammer & Tongs |
| "Sunset (Bird of Prey)" | 2000 | Rob Leggatt |
| "Demons" (featuring Macy Gray) | 2000 | Garth Jennings |
| "Star 69" (version 1) | 2001 | Damian Harris, Tim Fleming |
| "Star 69" (version 2) | 2001 | v |
| "Weapon of Choice" | 2001 | Spike Jonze |
| "Ya Mama" | 2001 | Traktor |
| "Planet of the Phatbird" (with Leftfield) | 2002 | Russell Thomas |
| "Don't Let the Man Get You Down" (version 1) | 2003 | Brian Belectic |
| "Don't Let the Man Get You Down" (version 2) | 2003 | Brian Belectic |
| "Don't Let the Man Get You Down" (version 3) | 2003 | Brian Belectic |
| "Don't Let the Man Get You Down" (version 4) | 2003 | Brian Belectic |
| "Don't Let the Man Get You Down" (version 5) | 2003 | Brian Belectic |
| "Don't Let the Man Get You Down" (version 6) | 2003 | Brian Belectic |
| "Slash Dot Dash" | 2004 | Tim Pope |
| "Wonderful Night" | 2004 | Jon Watts |
| "The Joker" | 2004 | Jon Watts |
| "That Old Pair of Jeans" (version 1) | 2006 | Jon Watts |
| "That Old Pair of Jeans" (version 2) | 2006 | Steve Glashier |
| "Champion Sound" | 2006 | Steve Glashier |

=== As featured artist ===
List of music videos, showing year released and director
| Title | Year | Director(s) |
|---|---|---|
| "Badder Badder Schwing" (Freddy Fresh featuring Fatboy Slim) | 1999 | —N/a |
