= The Pimp =

EP by Fatboy Slim
- Released: November 19, 2002
- Genre: Big beat
- Label: Skint Records/Astralwerks
- Producer: Fatboy Slim

Fatboy Slim chronology
Camber Sands (2002)	The Pimp (2002)	Palookaville (2004)

Professional ratings
Review scores
Source	Rating
Rolling Stone	3/5 stars

The Pimp is an EP by Fatboy Slim, released in 2002. It is the third and final EP in a series by Fatboy Slim; all three EPs were released on 19 November 2002.

== Critical reception ==
Trouser Press praised the EP, calling the Bootsy Collins-assisted title track an "enjoyable thumping" song.

== Track listing ==
1. "The Pimp" (Collins, Cook) - 4:32 (Feat. Bootsy Collins)
2. "Drop the Hate" (Remixed By Reverend H. Lidbo & The Progressive Baptist Choir Of Stockholm) (Cook, Daniels) - 7:20
3. "Star 69" (X-Press 2 Wine-Em Dine-Em 69 Supamix) (Clark, Cook, McCormack) - 8:19
4. "Retox" (Getting Freqy with Fatboy) (Cook) - 8:58
5. "Song for Shelter" (Pete Heller Beats and Pieces) (Clark/Slim) - 9:58
6. "Talkin' Bout My Baby" (Midfield General's Disco Reshuffle Mix) (Anthony/Cook/Hall/Ross) - 6:55
