= Illuminati (EP) =

EP by Fatboy Slim
- Released: November 19, 2002
- Genre: Big beat
- Label: Skint Records/Astralwerks
- Producer: Fatboy Slim

Fatboy Slim chronology
My Game (2002)	Illuminati (2002)	Camber Sands (2002)

Illuminati is an EP released in 2002 by Fatboy Slim.

The EP's title track is a re-make of a previous Fatboy Slim song entitled "Michael Jackson," which is featured on the US edition of Better Living Through Chemistry and was the B-side to the "Going Out of My Head" single. Bootsy Collins from Parliament/Funkadelic provides the vocals to the song. It was featured in the movie Lara Croft: Tomb Raider and is a long-running theme song for the WEC.

The EP was the first in a series of EPs released by Fatboy Slim.

== Track listing ==
1. "Illuminati" (Collins, Cook) - 4:18 (Feat. Bootsy Collins)
2. "Star 69" (Timo Maas Mix) (Clark, Cook, McCormack) - 6:32
3. "Song for Shelter" (Pete Heller Extended) (Clark, Slim) - 9:58
4. "Drop the Hate" (Laid Mix) (Cook, Daniels) - 7:19
5. "Sunset (Bird of Prey)" (Darren Emerson Mix) (Cook, Densmore, Kreiger) - 9:25
6. "Demons" (Stanton Warriors Mix) (Cook, Gray, Jackson, Withers) - 6:08
