= Lara Croft: Tomb Raider (soundtrack) =

2001 film soundtrack albums

Lara Croft: Tomb Raider is the 2001 action adventure film directed by Simon West based on the Tomb Raider video game series and starred Angelina Jolie in the titular character. Two soundtrack albums were released in order to promote the film: an original soundtrack and an original score, both distributed by Elektra Records. The soundtrack album, titled Lara Croft: Tomb Raider (Music from the Motion Picture) was released on June 15, 2001, featuring songs heard in the film, while the second album, Lara Croft: Tomb Raider (Original Motion Picture Score) consisted of the original score composed by Graeme Revell, which released on June 25, 2001.

== Lara Croft: Tomb Raider (Music from the Motion Picture) ==
Lara Croft: Tomb Raider (Music from the Motion Picture)

Soundtrack album by various artists
- Released: June 15, 2001
- Genres: Alternative rock; electronic; hip hop
- Length: 72:14
- Labels: Elektra; WEA

=== Track listing ===
Lara Croft: Tomb Raider (Music from the Motion Picture)
No.	Title	Music	Length
1.	"Elevation" (Tomb Raider Mix)	U2	3:36
2.	"Deep"	Nine Inch Nails	4:08
3.	"Galaxy Bounce"	The Chemical Brothers	4:45
4.	"Get Ur Freak On" (Remix)	Missy Elliott featuring Nelly Furtado	3:10
5.	"Speedballin'"	Outkast featuring Cee Lo Green (Note: Green's featured performance is not mentioned in the soundtrack credits) and Joi	4:56
6.	"Ain't Never Learned"	Moby	3:46
7.	"The Revolution"	BT	4:17
8.	"Terra Firma" (Lara's Mix)	Delerium featuring Aude	5:06
9.	"Where's Your Head At"	Basement Jaxx	4:43
10.	"Illuminati"	Fatboy Slim featuring Bootsy Collins	3:14
11.	"Absurd" (Whitewash Edit)	Fluke	3:40
12.	"Song of Life"	Leftfield	7:03
13.	"Edge Hill"	Groove Armada	7:00
14.	"Satellite"	Bosco	3:39
15.	"Devil's Nightmare"	Oxide & Neutrino	6:04
16.	"In Control"	Die Toten Hosen	3:13
Total length:			72:14

=== Reception ===
Stephen Thomas Erlewine commented that "this record is as sleek, glossy, and formulaic as the film itself, and like the movie, it's reasonably enjoyable as it plays (providing you're in the mood for it), but it's also curiously dated with its heavy electronic bent and devotion to the video game, feeling as if it really should have come out in 1997/1998 instead of the summer of 2001. And, like the movie, it's also pretty forgettable, more memorable for Angelina Jolie on the cover than the music itself." Sal Cinquemani of Slant Magazine, however, considered it to be "a satisfying romp through the latest in electronica".

=== Chart performance ===
Chart (2001–02)	Peak position
Australian Albums (ARIA)	10
Austrian Albums (Ö3 Austria)	5
Belgian Albums (Ultratop Flanders)	45
Belgian Albums (Ultratop Wallonia)	30
Canadian Albums (Billboard)	9
Finnish Albums (Suomen virallinen lista)	31
French Albums (SNEP)	55
German Albums (Offizielle Top 100)	30
New Zealand Albums (RMNZ)	4
Norwegian Albums (VG-lista)	36
Swiss Albums (Schweizer Hitparade)	14
UK Compilation Albums (OCC)	13
UK Soundtrack Albums (OCC)	9
US Billboard 200	32
US Top Soundtracks (Billboard)	4

=== Accolades ===
Award	Category	Recipient(s)	Result	Ref.
ASCAP Film and Television Music Awards	Most Performed Songs from Motion Pictures	Missy Elliott featuring Timbaland – "Get Ur Freak On (Remix)"	Won	
MTV Video Music Awards	Best Video from a Film	U2 – "Elevation (Tomb Raider Mix)"	Nominated	

== Lara Croft: Tomb Raider (Original Motion Picture Score) ==
Lara Croft: Tomb Raider (Original Motion Picture Score)

Film score by Graeme Revell
- Released: June 25, 2001
- Genres: Film score; orchestral
- Length: 48:58
- Labels: Elektra; WEA

Graeme Revell chronology
Blow (2001)	Lara Croft: Tomb Raider (2001)	Collateral Damage (2002)

=== Background ===
The film's scoring process was impacted due to the post-production changes. Originally Nathan McCree, who scored the first three Tomb Raider games was assigned to compose the film score, but executives at Paramount demanded a feature film composer. Greg Hale Jones and Peter Afterman were initially hired to score the film after production finished in November 2000, and Danny Elfman was tasked to write the main themes. However, Jones stated that once West was fired from the project, the score and Elfman's themes were eventually rejected.

Jerry Goldsmith, at one point, was considered to score the film but declined due to health reasons, while John Powell was also discussed to be involved as the film composer, which did not happen. Michael Kamen, who was also involved in the Tomb Raider game series, was then roped in to compose the score after submitting few demos which the production team being impressed. But despite writing a complete score for the film, it was eventually rejected after re-edits done by Stuart Baird. Later, Graeme Revell joined the film as a last minute addition and was tasked to write sixty minutes of music within less than 10 days.

=== Composition ===
Graeme Revell preferred mostly an electronic score as a favor to write much music within a short span and further felt that it was a creative decision as the film's style did not support a big orchestral action score. However, portions of the score was written for a 65 piece orchestra and a 50-member vocal choir recorded at the AIR Studios in London. Revell could not attend the recording sessions in London, as he had to stay in Los Angeles, and much of the sessions had been supervised by Ashley and John Kurlander, adding "we've had to redo a few things the orchestrators have misinterpreted but given the circumstances it has gone extremely well".

=== Release and packaging ===
The CD was released through Elektra Records on June 25. As noted by Revell, the tracks were mislabeled after failed attempts to stop the pressings, where in certain instances, the opening track included both "Main Titles" and "Lara Croft at Home" cues together. This resulted in Revell to apologize for the track sequencing errors that ultimately led to the poor listening experience through his website. The track list was later revised.

=== Track listing ===
Original CD titles
No.	Title	Length
1.	"Tomb Raider Main Titles"	3:14
2.	"Lara Croft at Home"	2:13
3.	"Powell and the Illuminati"	2:58
4.	"Lara Dreams of Her Father"	1:46
5.	"The Clock"	3:01
6.	"Home Invasion"	3:59
7.	"Alex West and Mr. Wilson"	4:05
8.	"The Letter"	1:25
9.	"Journey to Cambodia"	2:00
10.	"Angkor Wat"	7:36
11.	"Lara Battles Stone Monkeys"	3:32
12.	"The Brahman"	1:31
13.	"Siberia"	2:52
14.	"The Planetary Alignment"	5:08
15.	"Lara Defeats Powell"	3:38
Total length:		48:58

Revised titles
No.	Title	Length
1.	"Tomb Raider Main Titles/Lara Croft at Home"	3:14
2.	"Powell and the Illuminati"	2:13
3.	"Lara Dreams of Her Father"	2:58
4.	"The Clock"	1:46
5.	"Alex West and Mr. Wilson"	3:01
6.	"Home Invasion"	3:59
7.	"The Letter"	4:05
8.	"Journey to Cambodia"	1:25
9.	"Angkor Wat"	2:00
10.	"Deep in the Temple"	7:36
11.	"Lara Battles Stone Monkeys"	3:32
12.	"The Brahman"	1:31
13.	"Siberia"	2:52
14.	"The Planetary Alignment"	5:08
15.	"Lara Defeats Powell"	3:38
Total length:		48:58

=== Reception ===
Filmtracks based Christian Clemmensen wrote, "As Revell himself suggests, the Tomb Raider album is definitely not the best representation of his talents. The production quality of the album is sparse, matching the content of the music. Revell has been known to take underdeveloped ideas from previous scores which did not receive the best of treatment and incorporate them into his larger and better works at a later date. The title sequence of Tomb Raider shows a glimpse of something that could have been very entertaining had Revell been able to record it with a fuller orchestra and chorus after a decent amount of development time. As it stands, you have to give credit to him for getting anything done in this situation, but the album cannot escape the circumstances which led to 45 minutes of bland and uninspiring material."

Jonathan Broxton of Movie Music UK also added "Stylistically, Tomb Raider is apart from almost any other score I have heard recently – occasionally it reminds me of the more dissonant parts of Maurice Jarre’s Dead Poets’ Society, and there are some blatant Terminator quotations in ‘Lara Battles the Stone Monkeys’ and ‘The Brahman’, but that’s about as far as it goes. Revell is nothing if not a chameleon, able to switch styles and techniques with ease. It’s just a shame he doesn’t really excel at any of them – ultimately, his scores are lacking in character and individuality, falling into the trap of being totally nondescript away from its intended piece of celluloid. For all Revell’s heroic efforts, Tomb Raider is exactly that, and is destined to be remembered as one of 2001’s biggest disappointments."
