= Retox =

Retox may refer to:

- Retox (album), a 2007 release by the Norwegian rock band Turbonegro
- "Retox" (song), a 2002 release by the English DJ Fatboy Slim
- Retox (band), a 2010s American punk band
