= Talkin' bout My Baby =

Song by English musician Fatboy Slim

Single by Fatboy Slim

from the album Halfway Between the Gutter and the Stars
- B-side: "Drop the Hate"
- Released: June 3, 2002
- Recorded: 2000
- Genre: Trip hop, soul, big beat
- Label: Skint
- Songwriter(s): Norman Cook; Jack Hall; Jimmy Hall; John Anthony; Richard Hirsch; Lewis Ross; Leslie Bricusse
- Producer(s): Fatboy Slim

Fatboy Slim singles chronology
"Retox" (2002)	"Talkin' bout My Baby" (2002)	"Slash Dot Dash" (2004)

"Talkin' bout My Baby" (or "Talking 'bout My Baby") is a song by English big beat musician Fatboy Slim, released in 2002 as a single from his third studio album Halfway Between the Gutter and the Stars. The 12" single released for the song contained a remix of "Drop the Hate" as its b-side. Upon its release, it peaked at No. 92 on the UK Singles Chart. The vocal samples are taken from the Wet Willie recording "Macon Hambone Blues".

== Track listing ==
1. "Talkin' bout My Baby" (Midfield General's Disco re-shuffle mix)
2. "Drop the Hate" (remix)

== Charts ==
Chart (2002)	Peak Position
UK Singles (OCC)	92
