= Wonderful Night =

Single by Fatboy Slim featuring Lateef

from the album Palookaville
- Released: November 29, 2004
- Genre: Alternative hip hop; big beat
- Length: 4:46
- Label: Skint
- Songwriters: Norman Cook; Lateef Daumont
- Producer: Fatboy Slim

Fatboy Slim singles chronology
"Slash Dot Dash" (2004)	"Wonderful Night" (2004)	"The Joker" (2005)

Lateef the Truthspeaker singles chronology
"Wonderful Night" (2004)	"That Old Pair of Jeans" (2006)

Audio sample
- file; help

"Wonderful Night" is a song by English big beat musician Fatboy Slim, released as a single from his album Palookaville. It features vocalist Lateef the Truthspeaker, credited mononymously as Lateef on the single release. The song is often played at Staples Center immediately after Los Angeles Clippers home wins and at Madison Square Garden during the second half of New York Knicks games. A shortened version of the song also appears on the video game Dance Dance Revolution Extreme 2. The song was edited for radio due to the brief coarse language used in the middle of the song.

== Critical reception ==
The song garnered mostly positive reviews from music critics. David Jeffries of Allmusic felt the song was one of the highlights of the album. Pitchfork's Johnny Loftus called the song's rhythm "concise," also praising Lateef's performance. Rolling Stone's review of "Palookaville" called the song "groovy."

== Music video ==
A music video for the song was released; it features tuxedo-clad dancers in and around an old-fashioned casino following a singer that turns into a werewolf.

== Use in media ==
The song is featured in Robots, Just My Luck and Flushed Away

The song was mashed with Here Comes Santa Claus in a J. C. Penney Christmas commercial in 2006.

The Song was featured in Dance Dance Revolution Extreme 2 for the PlayStation 2, September 27, 2005.

The Song was featured in Castle episode Home is Where the Heart Stops aired April 20, 2009.

The Song was featured in NCIS: Los Angeles episode Hand-to-Hand aired April 6, 2010

== Track listing ==
No.	Title	Length
1.	"Wonderful Night (Album Version)"	4:49
2.	"Wonderful Night (Trash Remix)"	4:48
3.	"Wonderful Night (Wonderful Nightclub Remix)"	6:36
4.	"Wonderful Night (Chief Xcel World Wide Remix)"	3:48
5.	"Wonderful Night" (video)

== Charts ==
Chart (2004)	Peak position
Scottish Singles Sales (Official Charts)	65
UK Singles Chart	51
UK Dance (Official Charts)	12
