= Song for Shelter/Ya Mama =

"Song for Shelter" / "Ya Mama"

Single by Fatboy Slim

from the album Halfway Between the Gutter and the Stars
- Released: 3 September 2001
- Recorded: 2000
- Genre: Big beat, house ("Song for Shelter"); Big beat, rave, electronic rock ("Ya Mama")
- Length: 11:26 ("Song for Shelter"); 5:38 ("Ya Mama")
- Label: Skint
- Songwriter: Fatboy Slim
- Producer: Fatboy Slim

Fatboy Slim singles chronology
"Star 69" / "Weapon of Choice" (2001)	"Song for Shelter" / "Ya Mama" (2001)	"Drop the Hate" (2001)

"Song for Shelter"/"Ya Mama" is a double A-side single by British big beat musician Fatboy Slim, released in September 2001. Both songs are on his 2000 album Halfway Between the Gutter and the Stars. "Ya Mama" is on the Charlie's Angels soundtrack and film and in a trailer for Spy Kids. The single peaked at No. 30 on the UK singles chart. Both songs were omitted from his 2006 greatest hits compilation Why Try Harder.

The CD2 single is led by the Chemical Brothers' remix of "Song for Shelter".

== "Song for Shelter" ==
"Song for Shelter" is the first song on the single and the final and longest song on the album Halfway Between the Gutter and the Stars, lasting over 11 minutes, with the last two and a half minutes being the hidden track, "Talkin' bout My Baby (Reprise)". "Song for Shelter" features Roger Sanchez and Roland Clark. A remix for the song by The Chemical Brothers was made and released as a separate single.

The song's vocals are sampled from Roland Clark's song "I Get Deep". "Star 69" from the same album also prominently contains elements of Clark's song. The song was featured over the credits on several episodes of Green Wing.

When reviewing follow-up album Palookaville, Stylus Magazine said the song was "undoubtedly" Fatboy Slim's "finest moment to date", noting "the ten-minute house anthem “Song for Shelter”, whose redemptive power was so awesome that it almost saved Larry Clark’s inconceivably atrocious film Bully simply by gracing the last scene."

== "Ya Mama" ==
"Ya Mama", often mistitled "Push the Tempo", is the second song in the single and is featured on the soundtrack of Charlie's Angels.

The song contains various samples; the guitar riffs are sampled from "The Kettle" by Colosseum from their 1969 album Valentyne Suite. The "Push the tempo" vocals are taken from "Let the Rhythm Pump" by Doug Lazy. The "Shake what ya mama gave ya" vocals are sampled from "Shake Whatcha Mama Gave Ya" by Stik E & The Hoodz produced by platinum producer Frankie Cutlass.

Sometimes, the single is known as "Ya Mama/Song for Shelter" instead of the titles appearing the other way around. This title is given to several import editions.

=== Music video ===
The music video of "Ya Mama" was produced by Traktor, a collective also known for producing Basement Jaxx's "Where's Your Head At?" video and Madonna's music video for "Die Another Day". The song's music video is centered on a tape of the song which makes its listeners unwillingly enter into chaotic uncontrolled arm movements, trembling, dancing, to their own amazement as well as the other persons'. Tom and Jerry shorts Baby Puss and Jerry and Jumbo, predominantly the audio of the girl from the former, can be heard in the background inbetween breaks in the song, airing on Cartoon Network. It was filmed in Carriacou, Grenada, where a complete town market was built and destroyed.

== Track listing ==
CD

CD1
No.	Title	Length
1.	"Ya Mama"	5:40
2.	"Song for Shelter" (original)	7:18
3.	"Illuminati" (from the film Tomb Raider)	3:13
4.	"Ya Mama" (video)	4:51

CD2
No.	Title	Length
1.	"Song for Shelter (Chemical Brothers remix)"	7:03
2.	"Song for Shelter (The 20:20 Vision Rollin' Mix)"	9:40
3.	"Ya Mama" (edit)	3:15

12"

No.	Title	Length
1.	"Ya Mama"
2.	"Song for Shelter" (original)
3.	"Song for Shelter (Chemical Brothers remix)"

== Charts ==
Chart (2001)	Peak Position
Hungary (Mahasz)	10
Scotland Singles (OCC)	36
UK Dance (OCC)	10
UK Singles (OCC)	30
