= Slash Dot Dash =

2004 single by Fatboy Slim

Single by Fatboy Slim

from the album Palookaville
- Released: 20 September 2004
- Length: 2:53
- Label: Skint
- Songwriter(s): Fatboy Slim
- Producer(s): Fatboy Slim

Fatboy Slim singles chronology
"Talkin' bout My Baby" (2002)	"Slash Dot Dash" (2004)	"Wonderful Night" (2004)

Audio sample
- file; help

"Slash Dot Dash" is a song by English big beat musician Fatboy Slim, released as a single from his album Palookaville. Cook himself plays bass guitar on the track. It also appeared on Fatboy Slim's greatest hits album The Greatest Hits – Why Try Harder. The single peaked at number 12 on the UK Singles Chart, number six in Spain, and number 27 in Italy. The original version of the track, contained on an advance US copy of the album, uses a different vocal sample which was possibly changed due to sample clearance issues.

== Critical reception ==
"Slash Dot Dash" garnered negative reviews upon its release, with some critics feeling that the song was too similar to Fatboy Slim's previous work. Entertainment Weekly's review of "Palookaville" noted that "'Slash Dot Dash' and its high-BPM (beats-per-minute) ilk — feel(s) half-cocked, like Cook can’t quite commit to the moment." Pitchfork's Johnny Loftus was equally critical of the track, stating that the song is "as empty as the vacuum after the dot-com bust, a tinfoil crumple of store-bought spy guitar and a vocal sample that needles three times sharper than the funk soul brother."

== Music video ==
A music video, directed by Tim Pope, was released, featuring people vandalizing and dancing in a bathroom.

== Commercial performance ==
Despite the song's poor critical reception, it performed well commercially in the United Kingdom, debuting at number 12 on the UK Singles Chart and spending a total of three weeks in the Top 50. The song also entered the top 30 in Italy, where it reached number 27, and in Spain, where it reached number six.

== Track listings ==
CD

CD1
No.	Title	Length
1.	"Slash Dot Dash" (radio edit)	2:20
2.	"Close to Home"	3:36

CD2
No.	Title	Length
1.	"Slash Dot Dash"	2:55
2.	"Jin Go Lo Ba (Jon Carter mix)"	7:07
3.	"What They're Looking For"	5:51
4.	"Slash Dot Dash" (video)	2:25

12" vinyl

No.	Title	Length
1.	"Slash Dot Dash"
2.	"Close to Home"
3.	"Slash Dot Dash (DJ Delite)"
4.	"Jin Go Lo Ba (Jon Carter remix)"
5.	"Jin Go Lo Ba (DJ Delite)"

== Charts ==
Chart (2004)	Peak position
Ireland Dance (IRMA)	8
Italy (FIMI)	27
Scotland (OCC)	20
Spain (PROMUSICAE)	6
UK Singles (OCC)	12
UK Dance (OCC)	2
UK Indie (OCC)	1
