= Big Beach Boutique II (album) =

Live album by Fatboy Slim and Midfield General
- Released: 7 October 2002
- Recorded: 13 July 2002
- Venue: Brighton Beach, England
- Label: Southern Fried
- Producer: Fatboy Slim

Fatboy Slim and Midfield General chronology
Live on Brighton Beach (2002)	Big Beach Boutique II (2002)	My Game (2002)

Professional ratings
Review scores
Source	Rating
AllMusic	3/5 stars

Big Beach Boutique II is a mixed compilation album containing some of the songs that were played by British big beat musician Fatboy Slim and Midfield General in a live performance on Brighton Beach on 13 July 2002. There is also a DVD release which features the mix set performed by Fatboy Slim called Big Beach Boutique II – The Movie.

The album reached number 11 on the UK Compilation Chart.

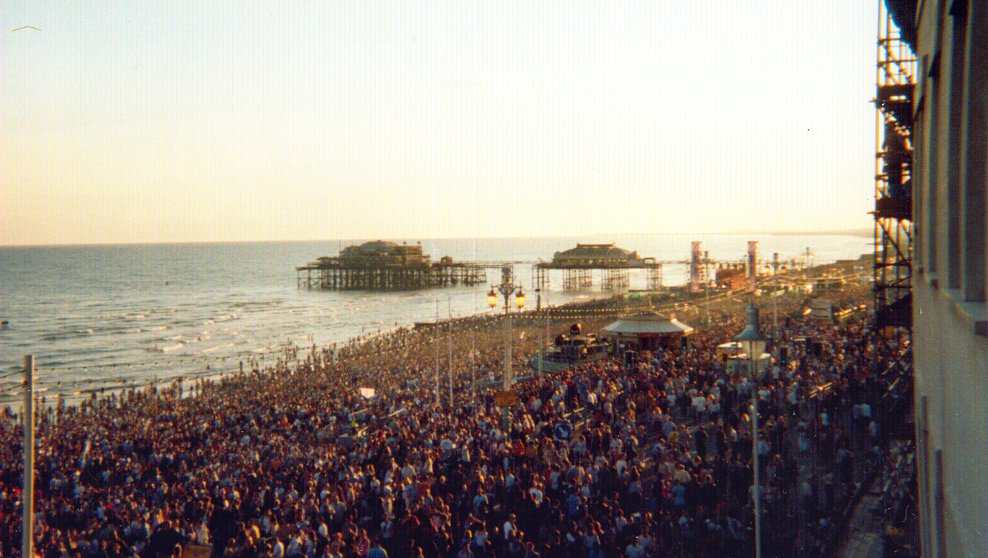
The Big Beach Boutique II concert, 13 July 2002

== Track listing ==
No.	Title	Writer(s)	Length
1.	"Reach Out"	Midfield General, Linda Lewis
2.	"Talking 'bout My Baby (Midfield General's Disco Reshuffle)"	Fatboy Slim
3.	"Superstylin'"	Groove Armada
4.	"Haze"	Danmass
5.	"Tied to the Mast"	Lo Fidelity Allstars
6.	"It Just Won't Do (dub)"	Tim Deluxe
7.	"77 Strings"	Chamonix
8.	"Crazy Talk (dub)"	Space Cowboy
9.	"Sexiest Man in Jamaica"	Mint Royale
10.	"Hi Jackers"	Glen Masters
11.	"Lazy (Fatboy Slim Dub mix)"	X Press 2
12.	"Let Me Show You"	Camisra
13.	"Long Time"	Static Revenger
14.	"Lord of the Land"	Cyclone
15.	"Farfisa"	Fusion Orchestra
16.	"Let the Drums Speak"	Mighty Dub Katz
17.	"Pure Shores (Norman Cook re-edit)"	All Saints

== Certifications ==
Region	Certification	Certified units/sales
Australia (ARIA)	Platinum	15,000^{^}
^{^} Shipments figures based on certification alone.
