= Roland Clark (DJ) =

American music producer

- Also known as: DJ Roland Clark, Dark Clark, Digital Pimps, Houseboy, Jesus Jackson, South Street Player, Urban Soul
- Born: November 7, 1965 (age 60); Newark, New Jersey, U.S.
- Origin: New York City, New York, U.S.
- Genres: House, deep house, techno, soul, pop
- Occupations: DJ, producer, songwriter
- Years active: 1987–present
- Labels: Atlantic Records, Delete Records, Deeptown Music, Defected Records, Skint Records, Strictly Rhythm

Roland Clark is an American house music DJ, producer, songwriter and vocalist.

== Biography ==
In the past, Roland Clark used the aliases Jesus Jackson, Digital Pimps, Dark Clark, South Street Player, and is also a founding member of the dance music project Urban Soul. He learned how to write songs from his childhood mentor Calvin Gaines.

In 1987, he released his first track, “Why!” (Atlantic 86653)

One of the many projects he has been involved in is "Flowerz" by Armand van Helden, from the album 2 Future 4 U from 1998, as well as delivering his writing and vocal talents to the likes of Todd Terry, Duke Dumont and Katy Perry.

He was featured on two Fatboy Slim songs, "Star 69" and "Song for Shelter", both of which sample part of Clark's song "I Get Deep" and feature on Fatboy Slim's 2000 album Halfway Between the Gutter and the Stars.

In 2017, "I Get Deep" was once again sampled in "Swish Swish" by Katy Perry.

His 2006 song "Running on Sunshine", which he performed using the Jesus Jackson alias and co-recorded with Fatboy Slim, has appeared in various ABC programming such as Grey's Anatomy and Men in Trees.

Clark is currently a resident of Atlanta, Georgia. Roland has since started a record label Delete Records, which is distributed by Label Worx Distribution.
