= Weapon of Choice (song) =

2001 single by Fatboy Slim

Single by Fatboy Slim featuring Bootsy Collins

from the album Halfway Between the Gutter and the Stars
- A-side: "Star 69"
- Released: 23 April 2001
- Genre: Big beat; funk
- Length: 5:45; 3:41 (radio edit)
- Label: Skint; Astralwerks
- Songwriters: Norman Cook; Ashley William Slater; Bootsy Collins; Sylvester Stewart; Andres Titus; William K. McLean
- Producer: Norman Cook

Fatboy Slim singles chronology
"Demons" (2001)	"Star 69" / "Weapon of Choice" (2001)	"Song for Shelter" / "Ya Mama" (2001)
"Please Don't" (2010)	"Weapon of Choice 2010" (2010)	"Machines Can Do the Work" (2010)

Music video
- "Weapon of Choice" from YouTube

Audio sample
- "Weapon of Choice": file; help

"Weapon of Choice" is a song by English big beat musician Fatboy Slim from his third studio album, Halfway Between the Gutter and the Stars. It features vocals by American funk musician Bootsy Collins. It was released as a double A-side single with "Star 69" on 23 April 2001; in the United States, it was released as a standalone single the following month. The single peaked at No. 10 on the UK Singles Chart. In 2010, the song was re-released in a remixed form.

The music video, directed by Spike Jonze, features actor Christopher Walken dancing around a deserted hotel lobby. It won multiple awards at the 2001 MTV Video Music Awards and won the 2002 Grammy Award for Best Music Video.

== Background ==
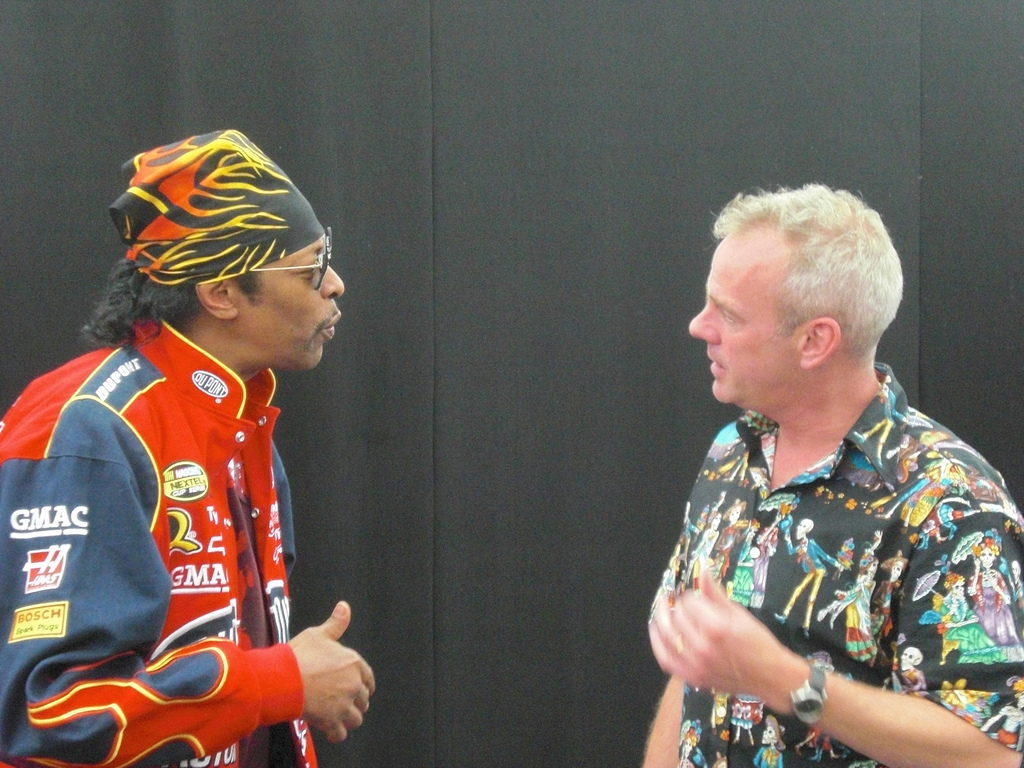
Bootsy Collins and Fatboy Slim in 2008

"Weapon of Choice" features a lead vocal by Bootsy Collins, known as a member of the funk group Parliament-Funkadelic and leader of Bootsy's Rubber Band. On the album version, Collins's normal vocals are heard through the right audio channel; the same vocals, distorted to a much deeper pitch, are heard through the left. The song features a prominent sample of Sly & the Family Stone's 1968 song "Into My Own Thing", as well as samples from "All Strung Out Over You" by The Chambers Brothers and "Word Play" by The X-Ecutioners, the latter of which was previously sampled on another Fatboy Slim song, "Don't Forget Your Teeth", the B-side to his single "Right Here, Right Now", and "Gangster Trippin".

The chorus of the song, "You could blow with this, or you could blow with that", is a homage to the Black Sheep song "The Choice Is Yours (Revisited)", which has a similar chorus. The lines "Walk without rhythm/and it won't attract the worm" quote the science fiction novel Dune, while the line "tone of my voice" may be the titular weapon, as used by some of the book's characters. The line "halfway between the gutter and the stars" refers to a line in Oscar Wilde's play Lady Windermere's Fan: "We are all of us in the gutter, but some of us are looking at the stars", and was also used as the album title.

The radio edit is referred to as the "Attack Hamster Edit", and is the version featured on Fatboy Slim's greatest hits album The Greatest Hits – Why Try Harder. Collins's vocal tracks, both normal and distorted, remain intact, but the distorted track is barely audible. It peaked at No. 137 on the UK Singles Chart. The song was briefly featured in the 2001 film Joe Somebody, the Malcolm in the Middle episode "Malcolm vs. Reese", The Lone Gunmen episode "All About Yves" and the 2006 film Night at the Museum. It was used in the E3 trailer of Skylanders: Swap Force in 2013.

On the album, the song segues from "Retox" and thus the ending of "Retox" is on this track. At 5:06 on the "single version", the last second (5:05) gets repeated many times until it finishes at 5:36. On the album, the last two seconds get repeated until 5:23, and scratching sounds start at 5:14 until the conclusion at 5:45. The single version and album version also have several other differences, including the ordering of vocal snippets towards the five-minute mark.

== Music video ==
The "Weapon of Choice" video, featuring Christopher Walken, is particularly acclaimed for its choreography.

The music video was filmed in the lobby of the Marriott Hotel (now the L.A. Grand Hotel Downtown) in Los Angeles in December 2000. Directed by Spike Jonze, it features actor Christopher Walken, who trained as a dancer in musical theatre before his acting career. Walken had asked Jonze to film his dancing, and Jonze suggested that he participate in the video. Fatboy Slim had originally been scheduled to have a cameo in the video, replacing Walken in the harness shots, but was unavailable that weekend because his wife, Zoe Ball, was giving birth.

In the video, Walken is relaxing in a chair in a deserted hotel lobby when he hears the song being played from a radio on a cleaning cart nearby. He begins to dance around the hotel before getting in an elevator, leaping off the balcony, and flying around the mezzanine. At the end, he returns to the chair and sits back down.

The "Weapon of Choice" video won six awards at the 2001 MTV Video Music Awards. Walken was awarded one of MTV's "Moonmen" for Best Choreography. The clip was also ranked number one on a list of the top 100 videos of all time by VH1 in April 2002 compiled from a music industry survey. The Swedish actor Mikael Persbrandt has also danced in a version of the video directed by Malik Bendjelloul. In 2012, British comedian and presenter Rowland Rivron also won charity TV show Let's Dance for Sport Relief with his reenactment of the video's choreography. In 2025, the music video was once again referenced in a promo for an episode of Saturday Night Live that featured that week's host, Glen Powell, reenacting the video's choreography in Studio 8H, only to accidentally break his neck and get sent to the hospital.

Walken has cited admiration for Jonze as one of his main reasons for appearing in the video, which he also welcomed as a chance to do "something different". He also noted that as a trained tap dancer, dancing to electronic music suited him well.

The music video enjoyed a resurgence in popularity in the 2020s following the announcement of Walken's casting as Shaddam IV in Dune: Part Two. The song prominently features lyrics that reference Dune, though it had no impact on Walken's casting. In an interview with GQ, Walken stated that he had not been aware of the connection between the song and Dune prior to appearing in the film.

In 2021, the video was remastered in 4K by Vanderquest; DJ Mag described the restoration as including wire and rig removal, face replacement work, and other visual effects.

== Accolades ==
Year	Nominee / work	Award	Result
2001	MTV Video Music Award	Video of the Year	Nominated
2001	MTV Video Music Award	Best Dance Video	Nominated
2001	MTV Video Music Award	Breakthrough Video	Won
2001	MTV Video Music Award	Best Direction	Won
2001	MTV Video Music Award	Best Choreography	Won
2001	MTV Video Music Award	Best Visual Effects	Nominated
2001	MTV Video Music Award	Best Art Direction	Won
2001	MTV Video Music Award	Best Editing	Won
2001	MTV Video Music Award	Best Cinematography	Won
2001	MTV Europe Music Award	Best Video	Nominated
2002	Grammy Award	Best Music Video	Won

== Track listings ==
"Star 69" / "Weapon of Choice"

No.	Title	Length
1.	"Star 69" (full version)	5:57
2.	"Star 69" (radio edit)	3:35
3.	"Weapon of Choice"	5:38
4.	"Weapon of Choice" (video)	3:31

"Weapon of Choice 2010"

No.	Title	Length
1.	"Weapon of Choice 2010" (Lazy Rich remix)	6:05
2.	"Weapon of Choice 2010" (Lazy Rich dub)	5:48
3.	"Weapon of Choice 2010" (Radio Edit)	2:59

== Charts ==
All entries charted as "Star 69" / "Weapon of Choice" unless otherwise noted.

Chart (2001)	Peak position
Australia (ARIA)	23
Belgium (Ultratip Bubbling Under Flanders)	14
Belgium (Ultratip Bubbling Under Wallonia)	18
Finland (Suomen virallinen lista)	20
Germany (GfK)	81
Ireland (IRMA)	21
Netherlands (Single Top 100)	85
Scottish Singles Sales (Official Charts)	6
UK Singles (Official Charts)	10
UK Dance (Official Charts)	2
US Alternative Airplay (Billboard) "Weapon of Choice"	33

== Certifications ==
Region	Certification	Certified units/sales
New Zealand (RMNZ)	Gold	15,000^{‡}
United Kingdom (BPI)	Silver	200,000^{‡}
^{‡} Sales+streaming figures based on certification alone.

== Release history ==
Region	Date	Format(s)	Label(s)	Ref.
United Kingdom	23 April 2001	12-inch vinyl; CD	Skint	
United States	1 May 2001	Alternative radio	Astralwerks	
United States	7 May 2001	Hot adult contemporary radio	Astralwerks	
United States	8 May 2001	Contemporary hit radio	Astralwerks	
Australia	14 May 2001	CD	Skint	
Australia	4 June 2001	12-inch vinyl	Skint	
