= Halfway Between the Gutter and the Stars =

Studio album by Fatboy Slim
- Released: 6 November 2000
- Genre: Big beat; electronica; soul; funk
- Length: 68:14
- Label: Skint; Astralwerks
- Producer: Fatboy Slim

Fatboy Slim chronology
You've Come a Long Way, Baby (1998)	Halfway Between the Gutter and the Stars (2000)	Palookaville (2004)

Singles from Halfway Between the Gutter and the Stars
- 1. "Sunset (Bird of Prey)" Released: 16 October 2000; 2. "Demons" Released: 8 January 2001; 3. "Star 69" / "Weapon of Choice" Released: 23 April 2001; 4. "Song for Shelter" / "Ya Mama" Released: 3 September 2001

Halfway Between the Gutter and the Stars is the third studio album by English electronic music producer Fatboy Slim. It was first released on 6 November 2000 in the United Kingdom by Skint Records and a day later in the United States by Astralwerks. The album features contributions from Macy Gray, Ashley Slater, Bootsy Collins, Roland Clark, and Roger Sanchez, and its title, referenced in the song "Weapon of Choice", is an allusion to the Oscar Wilde quote "We are all in the gutter, but some of us are looking at the stars."

== Edited version ==
An edited version also exists, which removes "Star 69" (due to the song's recurring use of the word "fuck", which is the sole reason for obtaining a Parental Advisory label), and removes the song's reprise used in "Song for Shelter". The artwork is also cropped to cut off right before the leg gap, (presumably for the subject likely being nude) and has a mark saying "Kiddies' Clean Version", similar in design to the Parental Advisory label on normal copies.

== Critical reception ==
Professional ratings
Aggregate scores
Source	Rating
Metacritic	64/100
Review scores
Source	Rating
AllMusic	4/5 stars
Entertainment Weekly	B−
Los Angeles Times	3/4 stars
Melody Maker	4/5 stars
NME	9/10
Pitchfork	4.2/10
Q	4/5 stars
Rolling Stone	3.5/5 stars
Spin	6/10
The Village Voice	A−

Halfway Between the Gutter and the Stars received generally positive reviews. Robert Christgau of The Village Voice wrote "this is where Norman Cook achieves the nonstop stupidity breakbeats alone could never bring him", calling it "All shallow, all pure as a result—pure escape, pure delight, and, as the cavalcade of gospel postures at the end makes clear, pure spiritual yearning. Transcendence, we all want it." The A.V. Club called it "a big load of disposable fun and funk that's fluffier than cotton candy and just as weighty".

Pitchfork wrote, "After enjoying a few years of relative popularity, it seems big-beat's appeal and relevance are waning. [...] After listening to Slim's latest, Halfway Between the Gutter and the Stars, it seems we've reached come-down time. And surprise! It's no fun at all ... The problem lies more with the everchanging landscape of electronic music and the dying big-beat genre than it does with his technical skill." Entertainment Weekly called it "Melodically repetitive, the songs only intermittently approach the energizing highs of earlier Fatboy cuts." Spin called it a "post-masterpiece puzzler where the kicks just keep getting harder to find, spread-eagle between pop limitations and artistic aspirations." In 2006, Tim O'Neil of PopMatters said the album was "extremely underrated".

== Track listing ==
No.	Title	Writer(s)	Length
1.	"Talking Bout My Baby"	Norman Cook; Jack Hall; Jimmy Hall; John Anthony; Richard Hirsch; Lewis Ross; Leslie Bricusse	3:43
2.	"Star 69"	Cook; Roland Clark	5:43
3.	"Sunset (Bird of Prey)"	Cook; Jim Morrison	6:49
4.	"Love Life" (featuring Macy Gray)	Cook; Macy Gray; Ashley Slater	6:58
5.	"Ya Mama"	Cook; Jon Hiseman; Dick Heckstall-Smith; Frankie Cutlass; Doug Finley	5:38
6.	"Mad Flava"	Cook	4:33
7.	"Retox" (featuring Ashley Slater)	Cook	5:17
8.	"Weapon of Choice" (featuring Bootsy Collins)	Cook; Bootsy Collins; Slater	5:45
9.	"Drop the Hate"	Cook	5:30
10.	"Demons" (featuring Macy Gray)	Cook; Gray; Bill Withers; Ray Jackson	6:52
11.	"Song for Shelter" (featuring Roland Clark and Roger Sanchez; includes the hidden track "Talking 'bout My Baby (Reprise)")	Cook; Clark	11:26
Total length:			68:14

Japanese edition bonus track
No.	Title	Length
12.	"Sunset (Bird Of Prey)" (Darren Emerson Remix)	7:19
Total length:		75:33

Sample credits

- "Talking Bout My Baby" contains samples of: "Macon Hambone Blues", written by Jack Hall, Jimmy Hall, John Anthony, Richard Hirsch, Lewis Ross, and Leslie Bricusse, and performed by Wet Willie.
- "Star 69" and "Song for Shelter" contain samples of "I Get Deep", written and performed by Roland Clark.
- "Sunset (Bird of Prey)" contains samples of "Bird of Prey", written and performed by Jim Morrison.
- "Ya Mama" contains samples of "The Kettle", written by Jon Hiseman and Dick Heckstall-Smith, and performed by Colosseum, "Shake Whatcha Mama Gave Ya", written by Frankie Cutlass and performed by Stik-E and the Hoods, and "Let the Rhythm Pump", written and performed by Doug Lazy.
- "Drop the Hate" contains samples of "Answer to Watergate", performed by the Reverend W. Leo Daniels.
- "Demons" contains samples of "I Can't Write Left Handed", written by Bill Withers and Ray Jackson, and performed by Bill Withers.

== Charts ==
=== Weekly charts ===
Chart (2000–01)	Peak position
Australian Albums (ARIA)	6
Australian Dance Albums (ARIA)	2
Austrian Albums (Ö3 Austria)	22
Belgian Albums (Ultratop Flanders)	30
Canadian Albums (Nielsen Soundscan)	23
Dutch Albums (Album Top 100)	64
Finnish Albums (Suomen virallinen lista)	39
French Albums (SNEP)	21
German Albums (Offizielle Top 100)	23
Hungarian Albums (MAHASZ)	36
Italian Albums (FIMI)	30
New Zealand Albums (RMNZ)	10
Norwegian Albums (VG-lista)	23
Scottish Albums (OCC)	11
Swedish Albums (Sverigetopplistan)	49
Swiss Albums (Schweizer Hitparade)	35
UK Albums (OCC)	8
UK Independent Albums (OCC)	1
US Billboard 200	51
US Top Dance Albums (Billboard)	11

=== Year-end charts ===
Chart (2000)	Position
Australian Albums (ARIA)	71
Chart (2001)	Position
UK Albums (OCC)	186
Chart (2002)	Position
UK Albums (OCC)	168

== Certifications ==
Region	Certification	Certified units/sales
Australia (ARIA)	Gold	35,000^{^}
Japan (RIAJ)	Gold	100,000^{^}
New Zealand (RMNZ)	Platinum	15,000^{^}
United Kingdom (BPI)	Platinum	300,000^{^}
United States	—	278,000
^{^} Shipments figures based on certification alone.
