= Big Beach Boutique II =

2002 Fatboy Slim concert in Brighton, England

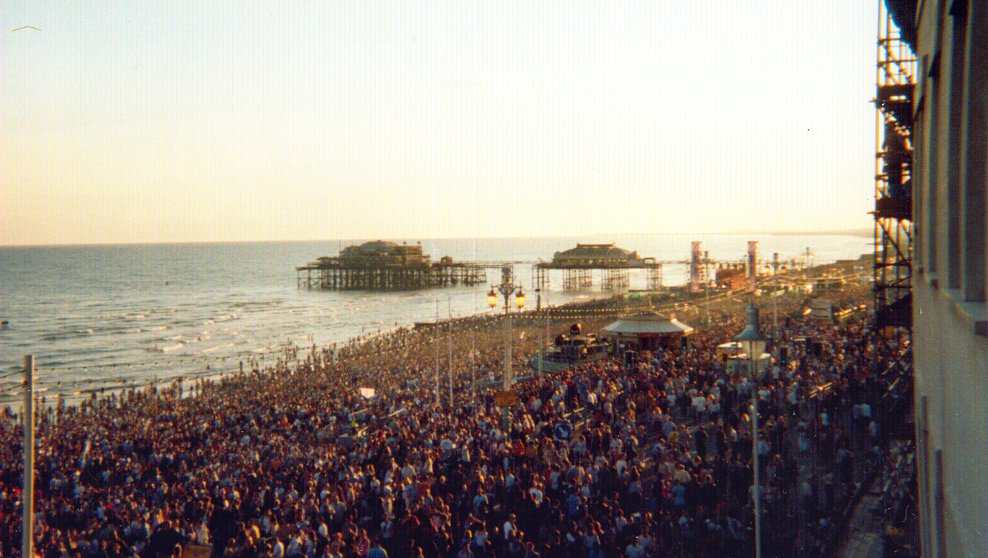
- View along the Brighton seafront towards the stage, with the derelict West Pier in the distance
- Date: 13 July 2002
- Venue: Brighton beach
- Location: Brighton, England; 50.8209°N 0.1505°W
- Type: Free concert
- Organised by: Fatboy Slim
- Participants: 250,000
- Deaths: 2
- Injuries: 171
- Arrests: 6

Big Beach Boutique II was a free concert held on 13 July 2002 by the English DJ Fatboy Slim (Norman Cook) on Brighton beach in Brighton, England. In 2022, Mixmag described it as the largest outdoor party ever to take place in the UK.

The concert was attended by around 250,000 people, four times more than expected. Local authorities were severely underprepared, which led to more than 170 injuries and six arrests. Two people died in the hours after. The cleanup operation lasted days and cost over £300,000, with 160 tonnes of rubbish collected from the beach. Cook donated £75,000 to the cleanup.

Big Beach Boutique II became a case study for event management and no similar free concert has been permitted in Britain. Cook feared a backlash, but received support from Brighton residents. He performed further concerts on Brighton beach in later years, with increased safety procedures and a limited number of tickets.

Cook released a live album and DVD, Big Beach Boutique II, in 2003. In 2023, for the event's 20th anniversary, Cook released a boxset, Right Here, Right Now.

== Background ==
In 2000, dance music in the UK was at peak popularity, controlling 13.3% of the album charts. In 2001, the DJ and producer Fatboy Slim (Norman Cook) held a free beach concert, Big Beach Boutique, in his home city of Brighton, England. It followed a screening of a cricket match organised by Channel 4 and was attended by around 60,000 people. The set was released as the 2002 album Live on Brighton Beach. By 2002, according to the Daily Telegraph, Cook was the world's most popular DJ.

== Event ==
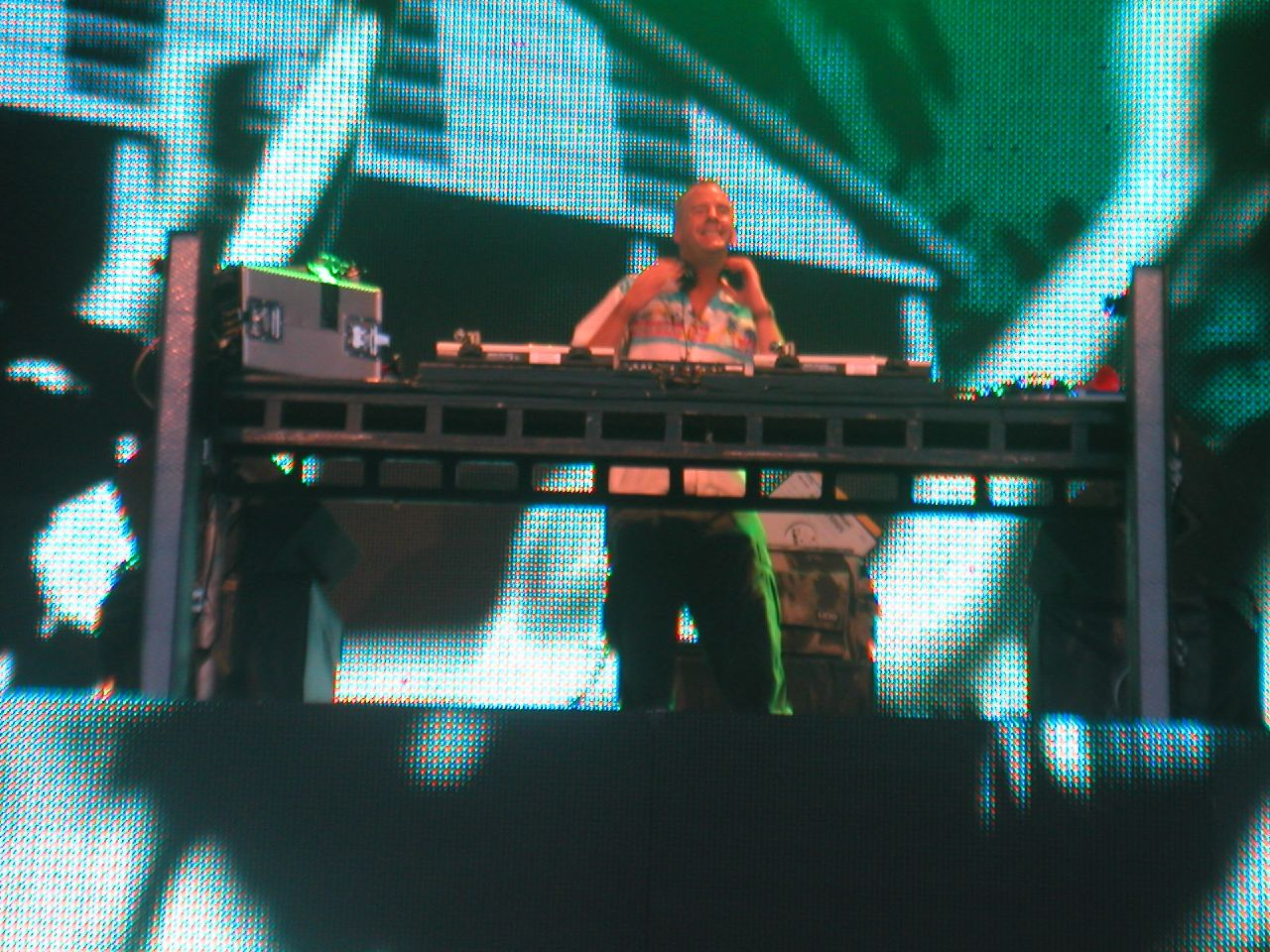
Cook performing in Portrush, 2006

Big Boutique II, a second free concert, was held on Saturday 13 July 2002. It was again sponsored by Channel 4; Cook contributed £100,000 after another sponsor pulled out. The concert was promoted by the DJ Chris Moyles on BBC Radio 1 and adverts on London buses. There was a heat wave on the day, with the temperature reaching 28 °C (82 °F) in the afternoon. Around 60,000 people were expected to attend, and Sussex Police allocated 50 officers. The concert was planned to start at 6:30 pm.

By 2 pm, around 50,000 people had arrived in Brighton. The A23 road, the principal route between Brighton and London, was backed up past Gatwick Airport, more than 25 miles away. Traffic was also affected on the A27. Brighton's car parks were full, and cars were abandoned along the coast and roadside verges. More than 250,000 people arrived, doubling the city's population. The audience included the actors Simon Pegg, Nick Frost and John Simm.

Many off-licences and pubs closed early after selling out their stock, and many in the audience had been drinking for hours. With no way to reach toilets, audience members urinated on the beach and shopfronts and in the sea. There were no crush barriers or ticketing system to limit the crowd size.

Fearing a fatal crowd crush similar to the 1989 Hillsborough disaster, the police's priority became safety rather than crime. They mobilised an additional 220 officers and the Metropolitan Police offered assistance. Security staff at the water's edge abandoned their posts, and riot police on the groynes were withdrawn for their own safety. A Brighton Borough Council official said: "There was a sense that more and more people were pouring into Brighton, a great tide, and there was nothing we could do."

The police considered cancelling the event, but feared this would trigger riots. According to Cook, the police feared that the happy drunken crowd would become "ugly" if the concert were cancelled. They allowed it to proceed on the condition that Cook finish 30 minutes early. In a live TV interview on the seafront balcony of the Grand Brighton Hotel, Cook said he was scared. The concert was supported by the DJ Damian Harris, who was ordered to delay the start of his set. He said: "When I got on the stage it was very scary. I was trying not to look up too often because it was daunting."

Cook opened his performance with "It Just Won't Do" by Tim Deluxe and ended with his remix of "Pure Shores" by All Saints. According to The Guardian, "the music was perfect" and "the crowd went into raptures". Cook left the stage at 10:30 pm, escorted by security to the Grand Brighton Hotel. In 2022, Mixmag described the event as the largest outdoor party ever to take place in the UK.

== Aftermath ==
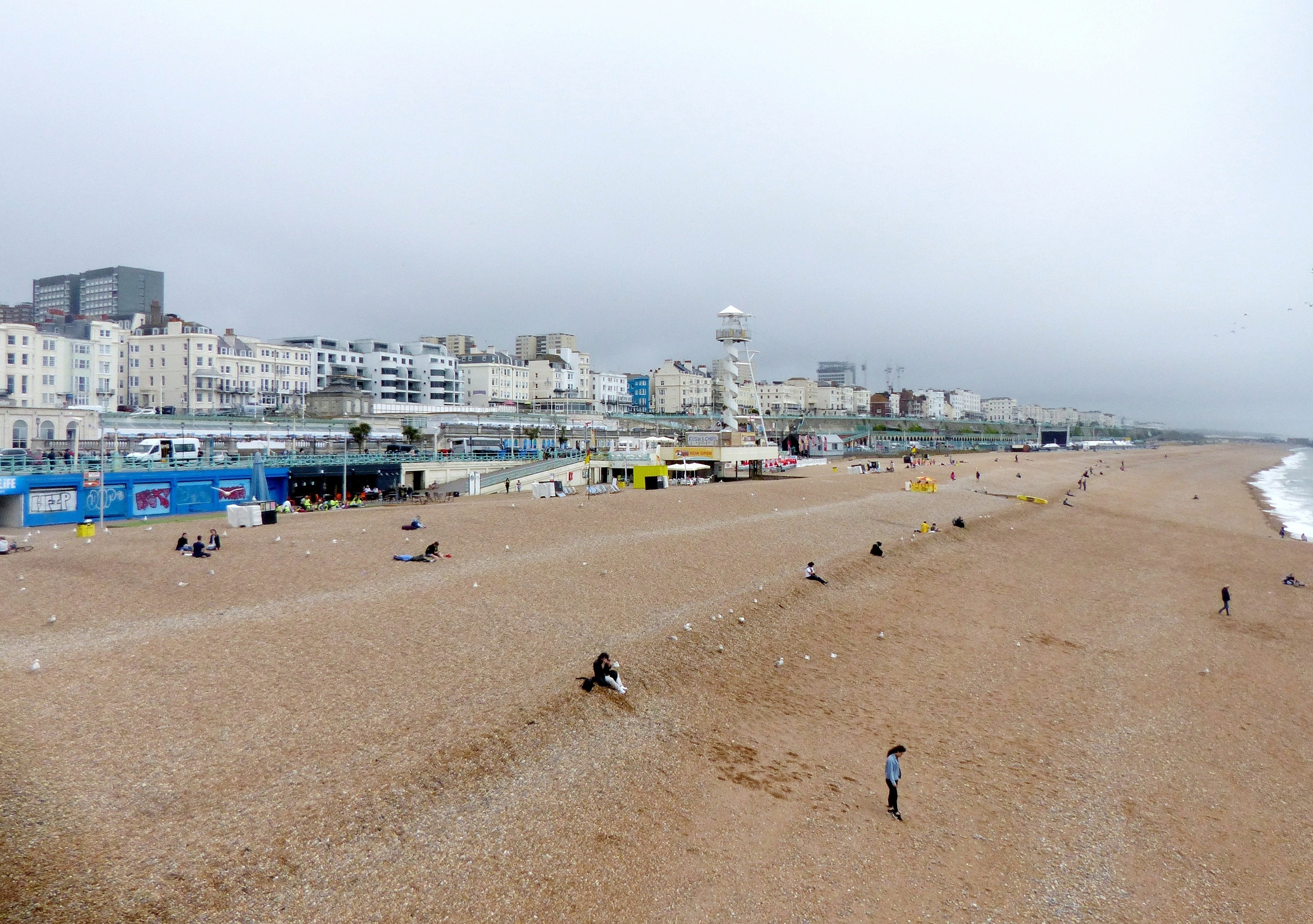
Brighton beach in 2018

After the performance, thousands headed to Brighton railway station, where the last train to London was due to leave at 11:03 pm. The power to the tracks was cut when people began falling from the platforms; some walked along the tracks. Thousands were left stranded in Brighton, with hotels full. Many slept on the beach, which now smelled strongly of urine and was covered in rubbish and broken glass.

Some clung to an ambulance to escape, while another ambulance became stranded in the crowd. Paramedics were unable to reach audience members who needed assistance. Ambulances and stretcher parties could not reach treatment centres, and some crews were abused by drunks. A coastguard helicopter hovered over the shoreline throughout the evening, with scores of unconscious people rescued from the sea. With the streets jammed, casualties were taken from the beach by lifeboats. Half the police who attended required trauma counselling.

A few hours after the concert, a 26-year-old Australian nurse fell 20 ft (6.1 m) from railings after drinking heavily and taking MDMA. She sustained serious head injuries and died in hospital. Several sources reported that a man had a fatal heart attack on the beach, though a report in The Observer a week later said this was misreported and he had died at home. 160 people received minor injuries, and a further 11 were taken to hospital. Six were arrested for assault, drugs and public order offences. Cook said: "At one point I thought my nightmare scenario, that I might be responsible for someone being hurt or killed, was coming true. I was really rattled."

In 2023, The Guardian wrote: "The catastrophe the authorities had feared … never materialised ... The crushes, violence and drownings that could so easily have claimed scores of lives didn't happen." This was credited to the "loved-up dance crowd", with one security member saying an Oasis concert would not have produced the same outcome. Harris said the event organisation had been "unbelievably professional" and that the crowd was responsive to safety announcements made from the stage: "Everyone behaved and looked after each other. Yes, some people were inconvenienced but a quarter of a million people had a great time and you just have to focus on that."

Channel 4 paid for litter pickers to start work as soon as Cook left the stage. The cleanup operation lasted several days and cost £300,000; Cook donated £75,000. More than 160 tonnes of rubbish were collected and walls were sandblasted to clean them of urine. According to The Guardian, Brighton "stank of urine for two weeks".

On the advice of his neighbour, Paul McCartney, Cook left the country for several days, fearing a backlash. However, he was supported by Brighton residents. The local newspaper, The Argus, printed a supplement to publish the letters of support, and BBC Southern Counties Radio received many positive calls. Cook said people in Brighton often asked him when he would hold another beach party. In 2016, he said: "I will always return to the mixture of elation and pure fear when we realised what we had created on that beach. The police were warning me exactly what might happen. And we were working all day to try and prevent that, whilst still entertaining and trying to put on a show. It was very edgy at times."

== Legacy ==
Big Beach Boutique II became a case study for event management, and no similar free concert has been permitted in Britain. The council considered banning future beach events, but allowed them after safety guidelines were approved. A live album and DVD, Big Beach Boutique II, was released in 2003. It was a bestseller in Brazil, and Cook performed to 360,000 people on the Flamengo Beach in Rio during Carnival in 2004. Cook said safety was paramount after the Brighton event.

On New Year's Day, 2007, Cook held another performance on Brighton beach, Big Beach Boutique 3. Tickets were only available to residents of Brighton and Hove, capped at 20,000. It was attended by stewards checking tickets, coastguard patrol and 130 police officers paid for by the organisers. Cook said: "We worked out the best way we could do it was to hold it on the worst day of the year to be standing on a beach, in that it's cold and you're going to have a hangover." Big Beach Boutique 4 took place on September 27, 2008, with the same ticket procedures. In July 2022, the 20th anniversary of Big Beach Boutique II, Cook headlined the On the Beach festival in Brighton.

In September 2022, Fatboy Slim released Right Here, Right Then, a box set of the performance including the original set, a DVD, and a book. On 4 February 2023, Sky Documentaries released a documentary about the event. Cook said: "I feel I can look back at the footage, remember the tunes, that sunset, my home seafront looking like a carnival in Brazil, so many beautiful people having the time of their lives. I have never seen such joyous madness, such good-natured abandon."
