= Drop the Hate =

2001 single by Fatboy Slim

Single by Fatboy Slim

from the album Halfway Between the Gutter and the Stars
- Released: December 10, 2001
- Recorded: 2000
- Genre: Big beat, soul
- Length: 5:30
- Label: Skint
- Songwriter: Fatboy Slim
- Producer: Fatboy Slim

Fatboy Slim singles chronology
"Song for Shelter (Remix)" (2001)	"Drop the Hate" (2001)	"Retox" (2002)

"Drop the Hate" is a song by English big beat musician Fatboy Slim. It was released as a 12" vinyl single on 10 December 2001 from his third studio album, Halfway Between the Gutter and the Stars. The single peaked at No. 25 on the UK Indie Chart. The song was released in December 2001, like his previous single, "Song for Shelter (Remix)". A remix of the song appears as a B-side to "Talkin' Bout My Baby".

Its vocal contains samples from a 1974 sermon by Reverend W. Leo Daniels called "The Answer to Watergate". Daniels, the then-pastor of the Greater Jerusalem Baptist Church of Houston, Texas, had eleven albums released by Jewel Records on its "Jewel Devotional Series".

== Track listing ==
1. "Drop the Hate (Santos Napalm reprise)"
2. "Drop the Hate (Laid remix)"

== Charts ==
Chart (2001)	Peak Position
UK Indie Chart	25
