= Live on Brighton Beach =

Live album by Fatboy Slim
- Released: 25 February 2002
- Recorded: 7 July 2001
- Venue: Brighton Beach, England
- Genre: Big beat
- Length: 71:15
- Label: Southern Fried
- Producer: Fatboy Slim

Fatboy Slim chronology
A Break from the Norm (2001)	Live on Brighton Beach (2002)	Big Beach Boutique II (2002)

Professional ratings
Review scores
Source	Rating
AllMusic	4/5 stars
Christgau’s Consumer Guide	(choice cut)
NME	7/10
Rolling Stone	2.5/5 stars

Live on Brighton Beach is a live album by the English big beat musician Fatboy Slim, released on 25 February 2002. It is a recording of Fatboy Slim's 7 July 2001 performance on Brighton beach, England. It reached number 19 on the UK Compilation Chart.

== Track listing ==
No.	Title	Writer(s)	Length
1.	"Born Slippy (Nuxx)"	Underworld	2:32
2.	"Right Here, Right Now"	Fatboy Slim
3.	"Austins Groove"	Kid Crème	4:18
4.	"Southern Thing"	The Scanty	3:54
5.	"The Groovy Thang"	Minimal Funk	4:23
6.	"Pray"	Santos	5:23
7.	"The Talk"	The Clumps	4:04
8.	"Where's Your Head At"	Basement Jaxx	5:47
9.	"Rocket Bass"	Jark Prongo	6:05
10.	"Drop Some Drums (Original Version)"	Love Tattoo	7:01
11.	"Put Your Hands Up"	Black and White Brothers	1:56
12.	"3-2-1 Fire!"	Santos	4:34
13.	"Star 69"	Fatboy Slim	7:19
14.	"The Real Life (Fatboy Slim Mix)"	Raven Maize	7:24
15.	"Sunset (Bird of Prey)"	Fatboy Slim	7:18
16.	"Phat Planet (Album Version)"	Leftfield
17.	"Speak Lord (I Get Deep)"	Roland Clark

== Charts ==
Country	Peak position
United Kingdom	19
