= Demons (Fatboy Slim song) =

2001 song by Fatboy Slim featuring Macy Gray

Single by Fatboy Slim featuring Macy Gray

from the album Halfway Between the Gutter and the Stars
- Released: 8 January 2001
- Genre: Big beat
- Length: 6:52
- Label: Skint, Astralwerks
- Songwriters: Fatboy Slim, Macy Gray, Bill Withers
- Producer: Fatboy Slim

Fatboy Slim singles chronology
"Sunset (Bird of Prey)" (2000)	"Demons" (2001)	"Star 69" / "Weapon of Choice" (2001)

Macy Gray singles chronology
"Why Didn't You Call Me" (2000)	"Demons" (2001)	"Geto Heaven Remix T.S.O.I. (The Sound of Illadelph)" (2001)

"Demons" is a song by English big beat musician Fatboy Slim, featuring Grammy Award-winning American R&B-soul singer Macy Gray. The song was released as a single from Slim's 2000 album Halfway Between the Gutter and the Stars, and later appeared on Gray's 2004 greatest hits compilation The Very Best of Macy Gray as well as Slim's 2006 greatest hits compilation The Greatest Hits - Why Try Harder. It contains elements of Bill Withers' 1973 song "I Can't Write Left-Handed". The gospel group The Blind Boys of Alabama covered the song on their 2005 album Atom Bomb. Recently, the song was featured in the Netflix series Sense8.

== Music video ==
The DVD single includes the "Demons" music video (with multiple angles), a "making-of" featuring an interview with Macy Gray, and a TV spot for the album. The video portrays a miniature man trying to rescue a woman being caught in the menacing metallic jaws of a piano in a cathedral. There are also intercut shots of Macy Gray performing the song herself in the sanctuary.

== Track listing ==
UK 12"

1. "Demons" (featuring Macy Gray)
2. "The Pimp"
3. "Camber Sands"

== Charts ==
Chart (2001)	Peak position
Australia (ARIA)	78
Australian Urban (ARIA)	16
Belgium (Ultratip Bubbling Under Flanders)	17
Belgium (Ultratip Bubbling Under Wallonia)	13
Croatia (HRT)	9
Italy (FIMI)	41
Netherlands (Dutch Top 40)	39
Netherlands (Single Top 100)	78
Scotland Singles (OCC)	16
UK Singles (OCC)	16
