= Let the Rhythm Pump =

Single by Doug Lazy
- Released: 1989

"Let the Rhythm Pump" is a 1989 single by Doug Lazy. It was Lazy's biggest hit, spending 13 weeks on the dance play chart in the USA.
