= Star 69 (Fatboy Slim song) =

2001 single by Fatboy Slim

Single by Fatboy Slim

from the album Halfway Between the Gutter and the Stars
- A-side: "Weapon of Choice"
- Released: 23 April 2001
- Genre: Acid techno
- Length: 5:55
- Label: Skint; Astralwerks
- Songwriter: Norman Cook
- Producer: Norman Cook

Fatboy Slim singles chronology
"Demons" (2001)	"Star 69" / "Weapon of Choice" (2001)	"Song for Shelter" / "Ya Mama" (2001)

Music video
- "Star 69" from YouTube

"Star 69" (also known as "Star 69 (What the F**k)") is a song by English electronic music producer Fatboy Slim, released on 23 April 2001 as the second single from his third studio album Halfway Between the Gutter and the Stars (2000). It was released as a double A-side single with "Weapon of Choice", as well as its own standalone release.

The song peaked at number 10 on the UK Singles Chart and reached the top 40 in Australia, Finland, and Ireland. It was later sampled by Katy Perry and Nicki Minaj on their 2017 collaboration "Swish Swish". Despite being promoted as a single, "Star 69" was omitted from edited versions of Halfway Between the Gutter and the Stars due to its frequent looping of an expletive.

== Background ==
The vocals on the song consist almost entirely of the repeating verse, "They know what is what, but they don't know what is what, they just strut. What the fuck?", sampled from "I Get Deep" by Roland Clark, which was also used on Fatboy Slim's song "Song for Shelter".

A radio edit of the track exists with the word "fuck" taken out. "Star 69" is popular with DJs and has often been remixed and used in mashups due to the vocal hook.

The song is included in the compilation CD Soundtrack 1: The Definitive Xbox Compilation, a compilation CD released in Canada to promote the first Xbox console.

== Track listing ==
CD

CD1: "Star 69" / "Weapon of Choice"
No.	Title	Length
1.	"Star 69" (full version)	5:57
2.	"Star 69" (radio edit)	3:35
3.	"Weapon of Choice"	5:38
4.	"Weapon of Choice" (video)	3:31

CD2: remixes
No.	Title	Length
1.	"Star 69 (Timo Maas remix)"	7:10
2.	"Star 69 (X-Press 2 Wine 'Em, Dine 'Em, 69 'Em Mix)"	8:20
3.	"Star 69 (DJ Godfather Detroit Getto-Tek Mix 1)"	4:03

12-inch vinyl

No.	Title	Length
1.	"Star 69"
2.	"Star 69 (Timo Maas remix)"
3.	"Star 69 (DJ Delite)"

== Charts ==
"Star 69" / "Weapon of Choice"

Chart (2001)	Peak position
Australia (ARIA)	23
Belgium (Ultratip Bubbling Under Flanders)	14
Belgium (Ultratip Bubbling Under Wallonia)	18
Europe (Eurochart Hot 100)	40
Finland (Suomen virallinen lista)	20
Germany (GfK)	81
Ireland (IRMA)	21
Ireland Dance (IRMA)	1
Netherlands (Single Top 100)	85
Scottish Singles Sales (Official Charts)	6
UK Singles (Official Charts)	10
UK Dance (Official Charts)	2
UK Indie (Official Charts)	1

"Year-end charts"

Chart (2001)	Position
UK Singles (OCC)	197

"Star 69"

Chart (2001)	Peak position
US Dance Club Songs (Billboard)	3

Chart (2022)	Peak position
Hungary (Single Top 40)	33

== Release history ==
Region	Date	Format(s)	Label(s)	Ref.
United Kingdom	23 April 2001	12-inch vinyl; CD	Skint	
Australia	14 May 2001	CD	Skint	
Australia	4 June 2001	12-inch vinyl	Skint	
