= Retox (song) =

2002 single by Fatboy Slim

Single by Fatboy Slim

from the album Halfway Between the Gutter and the Stars
- Released: 4 February 2002
- Recorded: 2000
- Genre: Big beat, electronica
- Length: 5:17; 3:29 (radio edit)
- Label: Skint
- Songwriter(s): Fatboy Slim
- Producer(s): Fatboy Slim

Fatboy Slim singles chronology
"Drop the Hate" (2001)	"Retox" (2002)	"Talkin' bout My Baby" (2002)

"Retox" is a song by English big beat musician Fatboy Slim, released in 2002 as a 12" vinyl single from his 2000 album Halfway Between the Gutter and the Stars. The single peaked at No. 73 on the UK Singles Chart. The song features Ashley Slater and for this release was remixed by DJ Dave Clarke.

"It all started with Vanessa [Rand], who's Tom from The Chemical Brothers' girlfriend," Norman Cook recalled in 2001. "We [Cook, wife Zoë Ball and the Chemical Brothers] all went away on holiday together after Glastonbury last year. Because the year before, we'd all had terrible comedowns, so this time we spent a detox week at a villa in Tuscany. But on the last night we went to this vineyard and brought back a case of wine, which we drank. And Vanessa says, 'This detox thing is all very well but I can't wait to go home and start retox.' So that inspired the track."

== Track listing ==
UK 12" single

1. "Retox (Dave Clarke remix)"
2. "Retox (Getting Freqy with Fatboy)"

== Charts ==
Chart (2002)	Peak Position
UK Singles Chart	73
