= Sunset (Bird of Prey) =

2000 single by Fatboy Slim

Single by Fatboy Slim

from the album Halfway Between the Gutter and the Stars
- Released: 16 October 2000
- Genre: EDM
- Length: 6:49
- Label: Skint, Astralwerks (US)
- Songwriters: Norman Cook, John Densmore, Robby Krieger, Ray Manzarek, Jim Morrison
- Producer: Fatboy Slim

Fatboy Slim singles chronology
"Build it Up - Tear It Down" (1999)	"Sunset (Bird of Prey)" (2000)	"Demons" (2001)

"Sunset (Bird of Prey)" is a song by English musician Fatboy Slim from his third studio album, Halfway Between the Gutter and the Stars (2000). The song samples Jim Morrison's vocals from the Doors song "Bird of Prey." Released on 16 October 2000, the single peaked at No. 9 in the United Kingdom, No. 20 in Norway, and No. 25 in Ireland.

== Music video ==
The music video of the song is set in 1964 and features Robert Jezek as a United States Air Force pilot flying a British-made Hawker Hunter fighter plane named the Bird of Prey. It opens with the famous "Daisy" television commercial, which was used as a campaign for President Lyndon B. Johnson during this year, showing the pilot sitting in a room watching this commercial. He drinks a glass of water which has something bubbling in it, intercut with an image of a brain and a piece of paper with text describing a chemical. An identification form with Fatboy Slim's real name on it, (Colonel) Norman Cook is seen. As the drug comes on, he imagines that he's flying the plane, and he eventually ejects and parachutes down, and then the hallucination stops. The actual song is playing during the flight sequence. Near the end of the video one can see the word "MKULTRA", which was a CIA-operated top secret confidential government project concerning mind control human experimentation, including using chemicals on test subjects (people) as truth serums. Also visible is another identification form with another name on it, Al Hubbard.

=== Production ===
The video was directed by Blue Source (Rob Leggatt and Leigh Marling), and produced by Blink. The producers had wanted a Lockheed F-104 Starfighter, to emulate the final scene in The Right Stuff where Chuck Yeager is seen to take a Starfighter and loses control, with him finally ejecting; the pilot in the video also ejects.

=== Filming ===
The filming took place at Duxford Aerodrome, and was produced by Flight Logistics of Borehamwood, who used an Aérospatiale Corvette to film the airborne scenes from.

=== Aircraft ===
The Hawker Hunter T8 XF357/G-BWGL, provided by Ray Hanna's Old Flying Machine Company, is shown in a USAF livery which was changed for filming using removable decals. The same company also supplied aircraft for Travis's Writing to Reach You in 1999. The silver colour scheme was chosen to represent T.7 XJ615, the Hunter trainer prototype.

It is an 11-tonne Hunter T.8C with a Rolls-Royce Avon 122 engine. The aircraft was built as a Hunter F4 by Hawker Aircraft at Blackpool in 1956, and served with 130 Squadron at RAF Bruggen, then was converted to a T8 in 1959 by Armstrong Whitworth Aircraft at Coventry. The aircraft stayed with the Royal Navy (Fleet Requirements and Aircraft Direction Unit or FRADU) until 16 May 1995. The aircraft has been with the Dutch Hawker Hunter Foundation at Leeuwarden Air Base since 15 May 2007, and has the Dutch serial N-321 painted in Royal Netherlands Air and Space Force colours.

== First version ==
An early version of the track, entitled "Bird of Prey" was released under the name Yum Yum Head Food on a 1995 US compilation of tracks from Norman Cook's Southern Fried label.

== Track listings ==
CD

1. "Sunset (Bird of Prey)"
2. "My Game"
3. "Sunset (Bird of Prey) (Darren Emerson remix)"

12-inch

1. "Sunset (Bird of Prey)"
2. "My Game"

== Charts ==
Chart (2000)	Peak position
Australia (ARIA)	63
Belgium (Ultratip Bubbling Under Flanders)	8
Belgium (Ultratip Bubbling Under Wallonia)	15
Europe (Eurochart Hot 100)	36
France (SNEP)	97
Ireland (IRMA)	25
Ireland Dance (IRMA)	6
Italy (FIMI)	31
Netherlands (Single Top 100)	91
New Zealand (Recorded Music NZ)	49
Norway (VG-lista)	20
Scotland Singles (OCC)	9
Switzerland (Schweizer Hitparade)	77
UK Singles (OCC)	9
UK Dance (OCC)	11
UK Indie (OCC)	4
US Dance Club Songs (Billboard)	35
