= Palookaville (album) =

Studio album by Fatboy Slim
- Released: 4 October 2004
- Recorded: 2003–2004
- Genres: Big beat; electronica
- Length: 53:27
- Labels: Skint; Astralwerks
- Producer: Fatboy Slim

Fatboy Slim chronology
Halfway Between the Gutter and the Stars (2000)	Palookaville (2004)	Here Lies Love (2010)

Singles from Palookaville
- 1. "Slash Dot Dash" Released: 20 September 2004; 2. "Wonderful Night" Released: 29 November 2004; 3. "The Joker" Released: 28 February 2005; 4. "Don't Let the Man Get You Down" Released: 4 July 2005

Professional ratings
Aggregate scores
Source	Rating
Metacritic	53/100
Review scores
Source	Rating
AllMusic	3.5/5 stars
Entertainment Weekly	C+
The Guardian	3/5 stars
The Irish Times	3/5 stars
Mojo	2/5 stars
Pitchfork	4.6/10
Q	3/5 stars
Rolling Stone	2/5 stars
Spin	B
Uncut	3/5 stars

Palookaville is the fourth and final studio album by English electronic music producer Fatboy Slim. It was first released on 4 October 2004 in the United Kingdom by Skint Records and a day later in the United States by Astralwerks. The album was nominated for the 2006 Grammy Award for Best Electronic/Dance Album.

As of 2025, Palookaville is the last studio album Cook has released under the Fatboy Slim name. When asked in 2019 if he had any plans to make a new album under the alias, he responded "probably not", while further stating "If I ever got around to making another Fatboy Slim album it'll probably be in a time when albums are completely redundant as a format".

== Promotion ==
Football club Brighton and Hove Albion F.C. temporarily named their Withdean Stadium after the name of that album following their sponsorship deal with Skint Records.

== Critical reception ==
Palookaville was met with "mixed or average" reviews from critics. At Metacritic, which assigns a weighted average rating out of 100 to reviews from mainstream publications, this release received an average score of 53 based on 24 reviews.

In a review for AllMusic, critic reviewer David Jeffries wrote: "Palookaville could stand one more trimming pass, but it gives Cook's canon the needed depth. Now there's a Fatboy Slim record for that rainy day and one the long-haired freaky people can enjoy."

== Track listing ==
No.	Title	Writer(s)	Length
1.	"Don't Let the Man Get You Down"	Norman Cook, Robert Leslie Emmerson	4:01
2.	"Slash Dot Dash"	Cook	2:53
3.	"Wonderful Night" (featuring Lateef)	Cook, Lateef Deaumont	4:46
4.	"Long Way from Home" (featuring Jonny Quality)	Cook, Sean Moody	4:44
5.	"Put It Back Together" (featuring Damon Albarn)	Cook, Damon Albarn	4:36
6.	"Mi Bebé Masoquista"	Cook, Sheldon Silverstein, Michael Settle	4:26
7.	"Push and Shove" (featuring Justin Robertson and Sharon Woolf)	Cook, Justin Robertson	4:27
8.	"North West Three"	Cook, Beverley Kutner	4:30
9.	"The Journey" (featuring Lateef)	Cook, Deaumont	4:36
10.	"Jin Go Lo Ba"	Babatunde Olatunji	4:40
11.	"Song for Chesh"	Cook	4:19
12.	"The Joker" (featuring Bootsy Collins)	Steven Miller, Ahmet Ertegün, Memphis Curtis, Jr.	5:21
Total length:			53:27

Japanese edition bonus tracks
No.	Title	Writer(s)	Length
13.	"Close To Home"	Cook	3:35
14.	"What They're Looking For"	Cook	5:52
15.	"The River Card"	Cook	4:43
Total length:			1:07:38

Japanese limited edition bonus disc
No.	Title	Length
1.	"Slash Dot Dash (DJ Delite)"	2:27
2.	"Wonderful Night (Trash Remix)"	4:47
3.	"Wonderful Night (Wonderful Nightclub Remix)"	6:35
4.	"Jin Go Lo Ba (Jon Carter Mix)"	7:06
5.	"The Joker (Justin Robertson Vocal Mix)"	5:34
6.	"Push And Shove (Acoustic Version)"	4:06
Total length:		30:46

== Personnel ==
- Norman Cook - samples, keyboards, synthesizer, programming, bass
- Simon Thornton - guitar, mixing, engineering
- Damon Albarn - vocals on "Put It Back Together"
- Lateef the Truthspeaker - vocals on "Wonderful Night" and "The Journey"
- Justin Robertson - vocals, bass and guitar on "Push and Shove"
- Sharon Woolf - additional vocals on "Put It Back Together" and "Push and Shove"
- Bootsy Collins - vocals on "The Joker"
- Jonny Quality - vocals and guitar on "Long Way from Home"

== Charts ==
Chart performance for Palookaville
Chart (2004)	Peak position
Austrian Albums (Ö3 Austria)	35
Belgian Albums (Ultratop Flanders)	54
Dutch Albums (Album Top 100)	83
French Albums (SNEP)	59
German Albums (Offizielle Top 100)	67
Italian Albums (FIMI)	48
New Zealand Albums (RMNZ)	40
Scottish Albums (Official Charts)	27
Swiss Albums (Schweizer Hitparade)	28
UK Albums (Official Charts)	14
UK Independent Albums (Official Charts)	3
US Billboard 200	149
US Top Dance Albums (Billboard)	1

== Certifications ==
Region	Certification	Certified units/sales
Japan (RIAJ)	Gold	100,000^{^}
United Kingdom (BPI)	Silver	60,000^{*}
^{*} Sales figures based on certification alone.^{^} Shipments figures based on certification alone.
