= Fatboy Slim =

English musician (born 1963)

- Fatboy Slim in 2023

Background information
- Also known as: Norman Cook; DJ Quentox; Cheeky Boy; Sunny Side Up; Yum Yum Head Food; the Feelgood Factor; the Brighton Port Authority
- Born: Quentin Leo Cook; 31 July 1963 (age 63); Bromley, Kent, England
- Genres: Big beat; electronic; acid house
- Occupations: Musician; DJ; record producer
- Instruments: Synthesiser; sampler; drum machine; turntables; bass guitar
- Years active: 1980–present
- Labels: Skint; Astralwerks; Southern Fried Records; BMG
- Formerly of: The Housemartins; Beats International; Freak Power; Pizzaman; Mighty Dub Katz
- Spouse: Zoe Ball (m. 1999; div. 2020)
- Website: fatboyslim.net

Norman Quentin Cook (born Quentin Leo Cook, 31 July 1963), known professionally as Fatboy Slim, is an English musician and DJ who helped popularise the big beat genre in the 1990s. His music makes extensive use of samples from eclectic genres, combined with pop structures, processed rhythms and "sloganistic" vocals.

In 1985, Cook joined as the bassist for the indie rock band the Housemartins, who achieved a number-one single with their 1986 cover of "Caravan of Love". However, Cook was uncomfortable playing pop music. After the Housemartins disbanded, Cook moved to Brighton to pursue dance music. He formed the electronic group Beats International and produced their 1990 number-one single "Dub Be Good to Me", and played in the band Freak Power. He also released house records under names including Pizzaman and the Mighty Dub Katz.

In 1996, Cook released his first album as Fatboy Slim, Better Living Through Chemistry, followed by successful remixes for Wildchild and Cornershop. His second album, You've Come a Long Way, Baby (1998), was certified platinum and produced the successful singles "The Rockafeller Skank", "Praise You" and "Right Here, Right Now". Halfway Between the Gutter and the Stars (2000) produced the single "Weapon of Choice", which won six awards at the 2001 MTV Video Music Awards. His free 2002 concert on Brighton beach, Big Beach Boutique II, was attended by around 250,000 people. Palookaville (2004) was less successful, attributed to the declining popularity of dance music and a more obscure style. In 2009, Cook released an album as the Brighton Port Authority, a collaboration with artists including David Byrne. He collaborated with Byrne again on the album Here Lies Love (2010), a concept album that was adapted into a stage musical in 2013. Cook has since focused on DJ performances over creating music.

Cook has a Grammy Award, nine MTV Video Music Awards, two Brit Awards and an Ivor Novello Award, and was nominated for the Tony Award for Best Original Score for Here Lies Love in 2024. He holds the Guinness world records for the most MTV Video Awards won by a DJ, the most MTV Video Awards won for a single video, and the most UK number-one singles by one musician as a member of different acts. He is an ambassador for Martlets Hospice in Brighton and has contributed to numerous community projects and charities. Cook's marriage to the BBC presenter Zoe Ball was highly publicised.

== Early life and education ==
Quentin Leo Cook was born on 31 July 1963 in Bromley in Kent, England (now part of Greater London), the youngest of three. His mother was a teacher in a hospital school, and his father was an environmentalist consultant who was appointed an Order of the British Empire for introducing bottle banks into the UK. His family belonged to the Kosmon faith, an obscure religious order.

Cook was raised in Reigate, Surrey, which he later described as a "suburban hell". He attended Reigate Grammar School, where he took violin lessons alongside the future prime minister Keir Starmer. At school, he became a fan of punk music and edited a punk fanzine. He adopted the name Norman when he was bullied for the name Quentin, which his classmates associated with the gay actor Quentin Crisp. He collected records and began DJing at 15.

At sixth form college, Cook met the songwriter Paul Heaton, with whom he formed a punk band, the Stomping Pond Frogs. He failed his A-level exams as he was focusing on playing music, and had to retake them. Cook moved to Brighton to attend Brighton Polytechnic from 1982 to 1985 and gained a 2:1 in British studies. In Brighton, he worked as a DJ and was taught how to mix by the DJ Carl Cox. He appeared as a reporter in the music video for the 1982 song "Goody Two Shoes" by Adam Ant.

== Career ==
=== 1985–1988: The Housemartins ===
While Cook was in Brighton, Heaton formed a band, the Housemartins. When their original bassist quit in 1985, Cook moved to Hull to join them. Cook said he learned to play the bass guitar in about a week. In 1986, the Housemartins reached number one on the UK singles chart with a cover of the 1985 Isley-Jasper-Isley song "Caravan of Love".

Cook was frustrated playing "white English pop" in the Housemartins. He was interested in hip-hop and dance music, but felt it was inappropriate for a white English man to work in this genre, and that no one would take him seriously. He was uncomfortable with acts such as Level 42 or Simply Red, who he felt "kind of pretend to be black". While with the Housemartins, Cook began working on dance music using a TEAC 144 Portastudio and Roland S-10 synthesiser, with no intention of releasing it. He also created a megamix, "The Finest Ingredients", that was played by the BBC DJ John Peel.

Cook described "Adventures on the Wheels of Steel" by Grandmaster Flash as " a pivotal record in my development from wanting to be in a pop band to wanting to be a creative DJ… He was doing stuff with the records that I'd never heard done before: making a collage, playing one tune on top of another, cutting between two really quickly. It just blew my mind."

=== 1988–1995: Beats International, Freak Power and remixes ===
The Housemartins broke up in 1988. Heaton and the drummer, Dave Hemingway, went on to form the Beautiful South, and Cook returned to Brighton to pursue dance music. He invested in equipment including a mixing console, an eight-track reel-to-reel, an Atari ST computer, an Akai S950 sampler and, later, a Roland TB-303 synthesiser. He released successful remixes such as "Blame It on the Bassline" with MC Wildski, which reached number 29 on the UK singles chart. He also formed a sound system collective, Beats International, with a collection of MCs and singers. Their single "Dub Be Good to Me" (1990) reached number one, but their second album, Excursion on the Version (1991), was a failure.

After Beats International disbanded in 1992, Cook's marriage ended and he suffered a mental breakdown. According to Cook, he became a self-destructive workaholic, drank heavily and alienated his friends. When therapy was ineffective, he began self-medicating with ecstasy. Facing bankruptcy, he took work composing for a Smurfs video game. Cook formed an acid jazz band, Freak Power, with musicians including the trombonist Ashley Slater, which released the successful 1993 single "Turn On, Tune In, Cop Out" on Island Records. Cook felt uncomfortable in the band, and recalled thinking on stage: "I'm a really crap guitarist. What am I doing here? I've spent the last 10 years getting pissed in nightclubs, learning how to DJ."

In 1993, Cook and John Reid formed the house duo Pizzaman. Their only album, Pizzamania, produced three top-40 singles. Cook also released music as the Mighty Dub Katz, recording two or three tracks a week in his home studio. As Cook's contract with Island forbade him from releasing or promoting music on other labels under his own name, he released them under aliases including Cheeky Boy, Sunny Side Up, Yum Yum Head Food and the Feelgood Factor, often on his own label, Southern Fried Records. Cook said his names reflected the fact that he did not take his work seriously.

=== 1995–1997: Fatboy Slim and Better Living Through Chemistry ===
Cook adopted the stage name Fatboy Slim in 1995. He said it was a meaningless oxymoron that suited him as it was "goofy" and ironic, and could not remember its origin. Around this period, the house music label Loaded Records created a new imprint in Brighton, Skint Records. Its first record was the Fatboy Slim track "Santa Cruz" in 1995. It sold only 800 copies, but attracted attention in the underground dance scene in the UK. Cook was surprised to hear "Santa Cruz" played at an event in London by the Chemical Brothers, then known as the Dust Brothers, and said it was "like meeting the rest of my long-lost family".

Cook co-founded a popular club night at the Concorde in Brighton, the Big Beat Boutique, where he played music from genres including northern soul, acid house, hip-hop and reggae, combined with breakbeats. The scene became the foundation of big beat music. Cook later wrote of the "enormous collective pride" in the big beat genre being named after the club night, just as house and garage music were named after venues in Chicago and New York City. Cook described it as a "very productive time", when acts such as the Chemical Brothers, Death in Vegas, Monkey Mafia, Bentley Rhythm Ace and FC Kahuna were "breaking rules and feeding off each other".

Cook's friends encouraged him to make music similar to the style he was playing in his DJ sets. Skint released the first Fatboy Slim album, Better Living Through Chemistry, in 1996. That year 1996, Cook performed as Fatboy Slim at Glastonbury Festival for the first time. As of 2024, he had played at every Glastonbury festival since. According to The Independent, by 1997, Cook had become "part of an elite coterie of superstar DJs" who earned large fees to perform at international venues and were "guaranteed to fill dance floors from Manchester to Madrid".

=== 1998–1999: You've Come a Long Way, Baby and international success ===
In 1998, Cook's remix of "Renegade Master" by Wildchild reached number three on the UK singles chart, and his remix of "Brimful of Asha" by Cornershop reached number one. Cook said the tracks represented a creative breakthrough: "That's when I was like, I've nailed it now, I've got the formula." He began receiving interest from artists such as Madonna and Robbie Williams. He turned down an offer from the Pet Shop Boys to produce their next album, as he liked their music but felt it did not suit his style.

For his second album, You've Come a Long Way, Baby (1998), Cook aimed to create a coherent album using "all the ideas that had been brewing and fermenting" in the big beat scene. He created three successful singles in one week: "The Rockafeller Skank", "Praise You" and "Right Here, Right Now". "Praise You" was the first Fatboy Slim UK number-one single, and its music video, directed by Spike Jonze, won numerous awards. At the 1999 MTV Video Music Awards in New York City, Cook performed "Praise You" and won three awards, including Breakthrough Video. Four days later, You've Come a Long Way, Baby was certified platinum. That year, Cook won the Brit Award for Best British Dance Act. He also married the BBC presenter Zoe Ball, triggering attention from the tabloid media.

=== 2000–2003: Halfway Between the Gutter and the Stars and Brighton beach ===
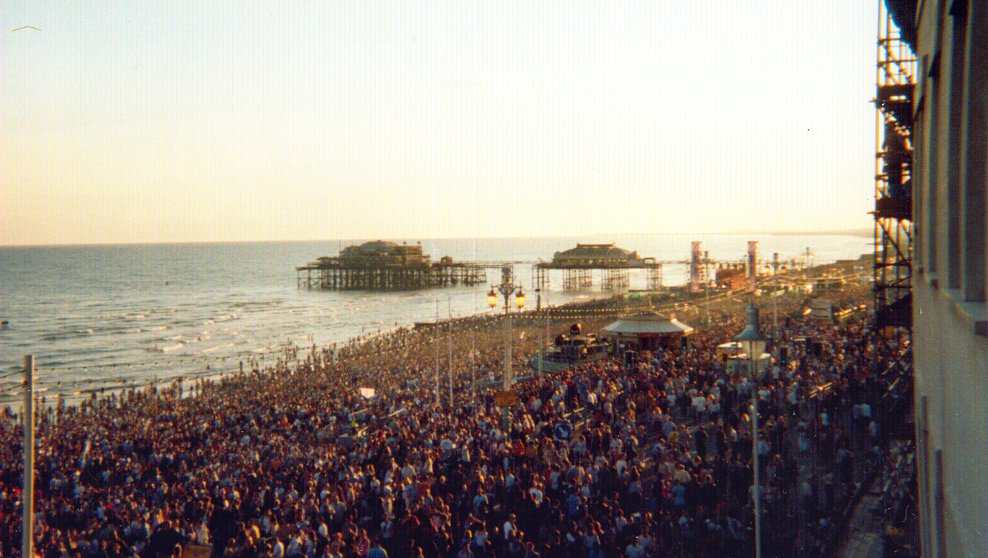
Big Beach Boutique II in 2002, when more than 250,000 people saw Fatboy Slim perform at a free concert on Brighton beach

In 2000, dance music was at peak popularity, controlling 13.3% of the UK album charts. Cook was a key figure in the rising popularity of club culture in the UK, along with acts such as Chemical Brothers, Basement Jaxx, Underworld, Groove Armada and Leftfield. That year, Cook released the third Fatboy Slim album, Halfway Between the Gutter and the Stars, featuring collaborations with Macy Gray and Bootsy Collins. He attempted to create a less radio-friendly album, saying: "I'm much happier at number nine in the charts than at number one because you're still top ten but it's a lot less work and stress."

The video for "Weapon of Choice", directed by Spike Jonze and featuring Christopher Walken dancing through a hotel, won six awards at the 2001 MTV Video Music Awards. Cook earned the Guinness world records for the most MTV Video Awards won by a DJ and the most MTV Video Awards won for a single video. The album also included "Sunset (Bird of Prey)", whose video used the 1964 "Daisy Girl" campaign ad. In the same year, Cook released The Fatboy Slim / Norman Cook Collection, a compilation of his remixes from the 1980s and early 90s.

In 2001, Cook held a free beach concert, Big Beach Boutique, in Brighton. It was attended by around 60,000 people. The set was released as the 2002 album Live on Brighton Beach. By 2002, according to the Daily Telegraph, Fatboy Slim was the "world's biggest DJ". That July, he played a second free concert on Brighton beach, Big Beach Boutique II. It was attended by around 250,000 people, four times more than expected. Local authorities were severely underprepared, which led to more than 170 injuries and six arrests. Two people died in the hours after the concert. The cleanup operation lasted days and cost over £300,000, with 160 tonnes of rubbish collected from the beach. However, Cook was supported by Brighton residents. The Brighton newspaper The Argus printed a supplement to publish the letters supporting him, and BBC Southern Counties Radio received many positive calls.

In 2001, Cook won his second Brit Award for Best British Dance Act. Cook released a live album and DVD of the Brighton beach performance, Big Beach Boutique II, in 2003. He contributed production to "Crazy Beat" and "Gene by Gene" on the 2003 Blur album Think Tank.

=== 2004–2008: Palookaville ===
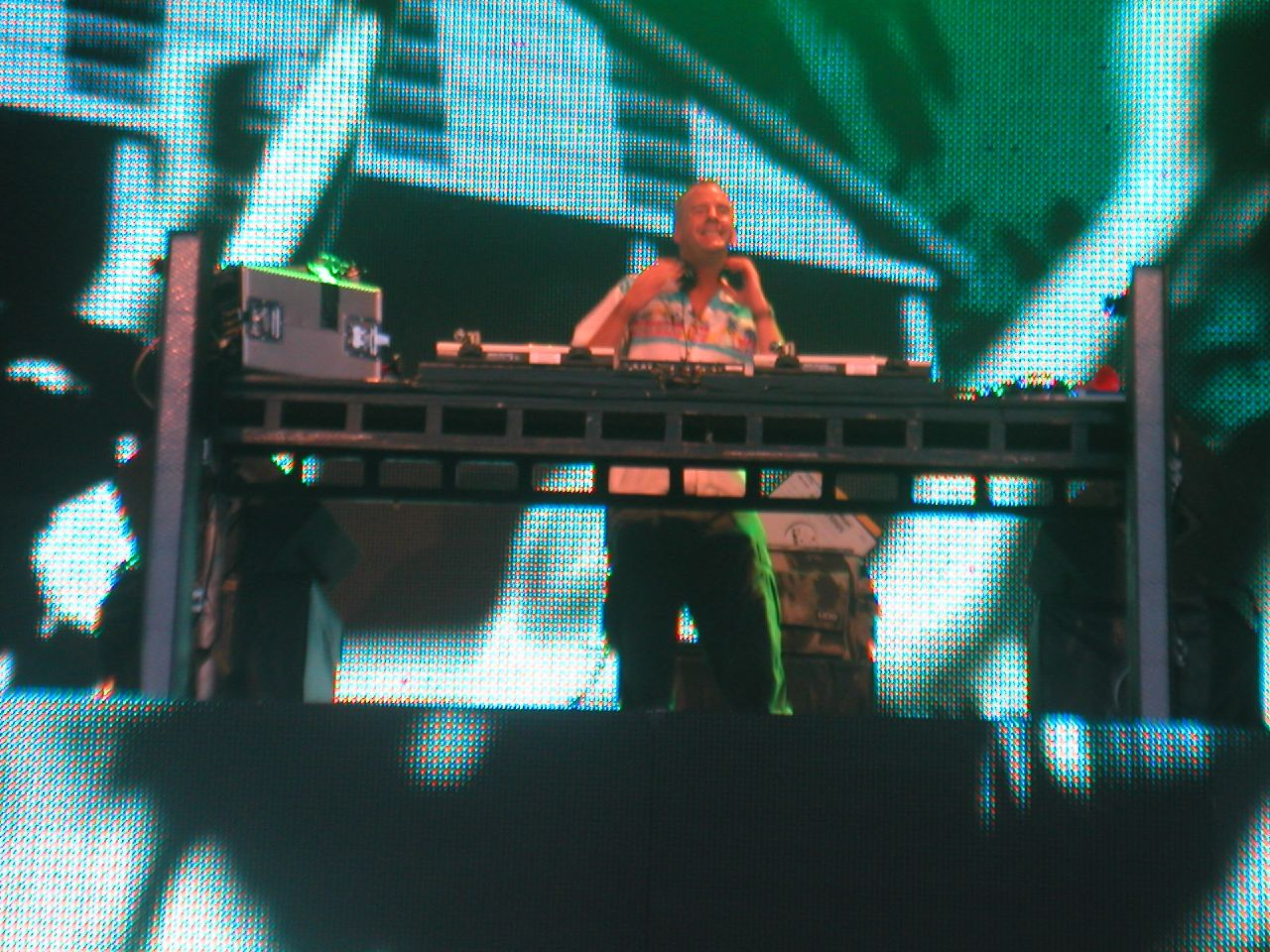
Cook performing in Portrush, 2006

By 2004, dance music was in commercial decline, replaced by a resurgence of guitar bands. That year, Cook released his fourth album, Palookaville. It sold far fewer copies than his previous albums, which Cook credited to its more obscure musical style. Cook said he was "happy to take my foot off the gas for a bit" and receive less tabloid attention.

After the Big Beach Boutique II DVD became a bestseller in Brazil, Cook played to an estimated 360,000 people in Rio in 2004. He returned many times in the following years, and performed on the reality TV show Big Brother Brasil in 2005. His 2007 tour was released on DVD as Adventures in Brazil. Cook filled the Friday night headline slot on the Other Stage at Glastonbury Festival 2005.

In June 2006, he played a headline performance at the RockNess festival on the shores of Loch Ness. The Greatest Hits – Why Try Harder was released that month, including the new tracks "Champion Sound" and "That Old Pair of Jeans". On New Year's Day, 2007, Cook held another performance on Brighton beach, Big Beach Boutique 3. Tickets were only available to residents of Brighton and Hove, capped at 20,000. Big Beach Boutique 4 took place on September 27, 2008, with the same ticket procedures.

=== 2008–2014: The Brighton Port Authority and Here Lies Love ===
In 2008, Cook played at Glastonbury Festival, the O2 Wireless Festival, Rockness Festival and Coachella. In 2009, he released the album I Think We're Gonna Need a Bigger Boat as the virtual band the Brighton Port Authority, featuring Iggy Pop, David Byrne, Dizzee Rascal, Martha Wainwright and Ashley Beedle. Cook also produced two tracks on The Revolution Presents, a 2009 compilation album by various Cuban musicians, which he later regretted, saying: "I'm not Paul Simon – I'm not the world's best musical ambassador, it wasn't my forte."

Cook played an unadvertised concert at Glastonbury 2009, and headlined the east dance stage at Glastonbury 2010. He collaborated with Byrne again on Here Lies Love (2010), a concept album about the life of the Philippines First Lady Imelda Marcos. A musical based on the album premiered in 2013 at the Public Theater in New York City and opened on Broadway in 2023.

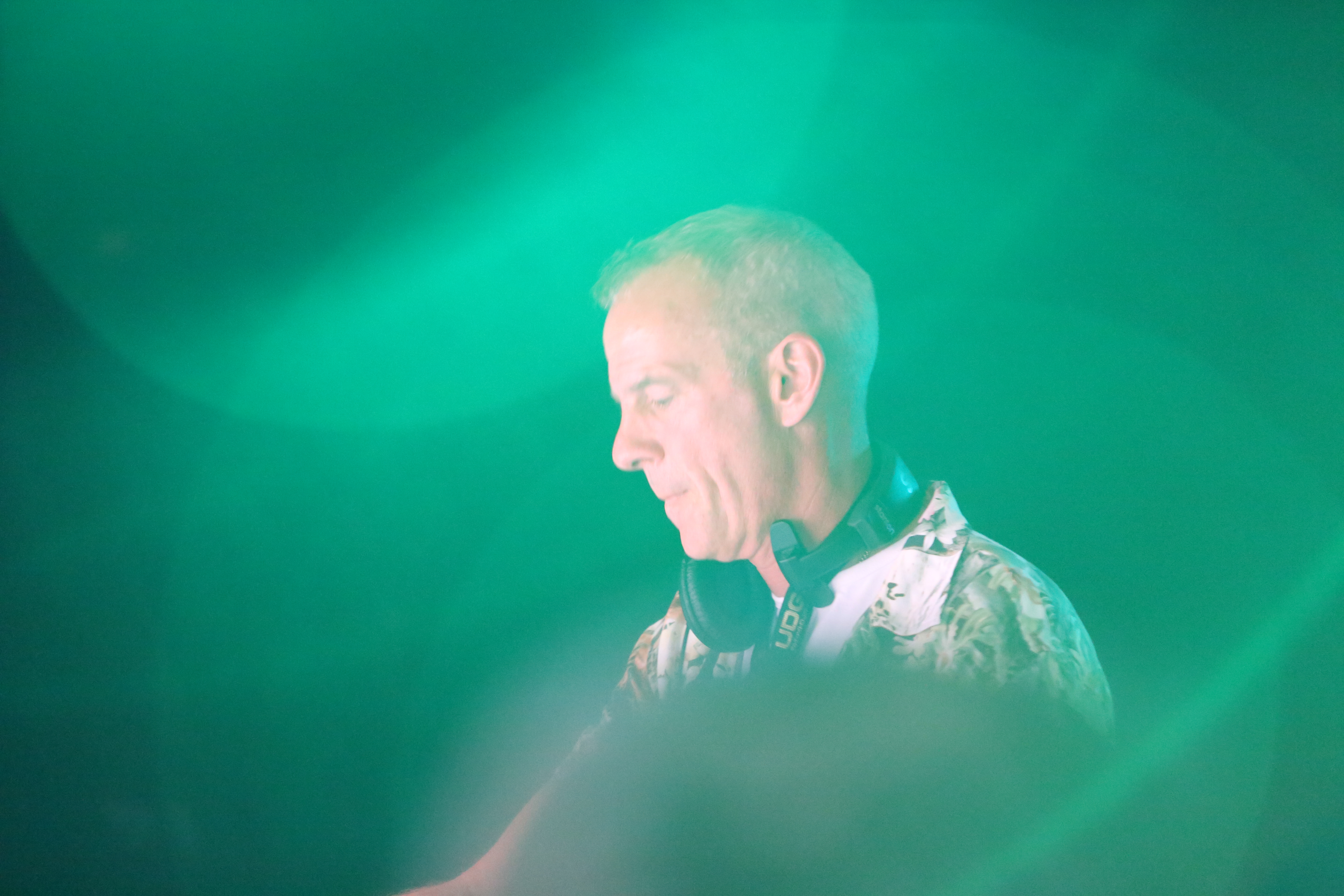
Cook performing at Glastonbury Festival 2013

In the 2010s, as EDM grew in popularity worldwide, Cook began performing more frequently in the United States. On 18 June 2010, he performed at the Cool Britannia FIFA World Cup music festival at the Cape Town International Convention Centre in South Africa. In 2011, he received PRS for Music award for Outstanding Contribution to Music at the Ivor Novello Awards. On 30 May, he was the headliner at Movement Electronic Music Festival in Detroit. He headlined Bestival on the Isle of Wight on 11 September. Cook performed "Right Here, Right Now" and "The Rockefeller Skank" at the 2012 Summer Olympics closing ceremony in London. On 1 September, he performed at Brighton Pride. In March 2012, Cook hosted a ten-part radio programme, On The Road To Big Beach Bootique 5, on XFM.

In 2013, Cook performed at Ultra Music Festival in Miami. That year, he released "Eat, Sleep, Rave, Repeat", with Riva Starr and Beardyman, which reached number three in the UK and introduced Fatboy Slim to younger audiences. Supported by a remix from the Scottish DJ Calvin Harris, it topped the UK Dance Chart. Cook contributed to Bem Brasil, a 2014 compilation of Brazilian music remixed by various DJs and producers.

=== 2015—present: Focus on performances ===
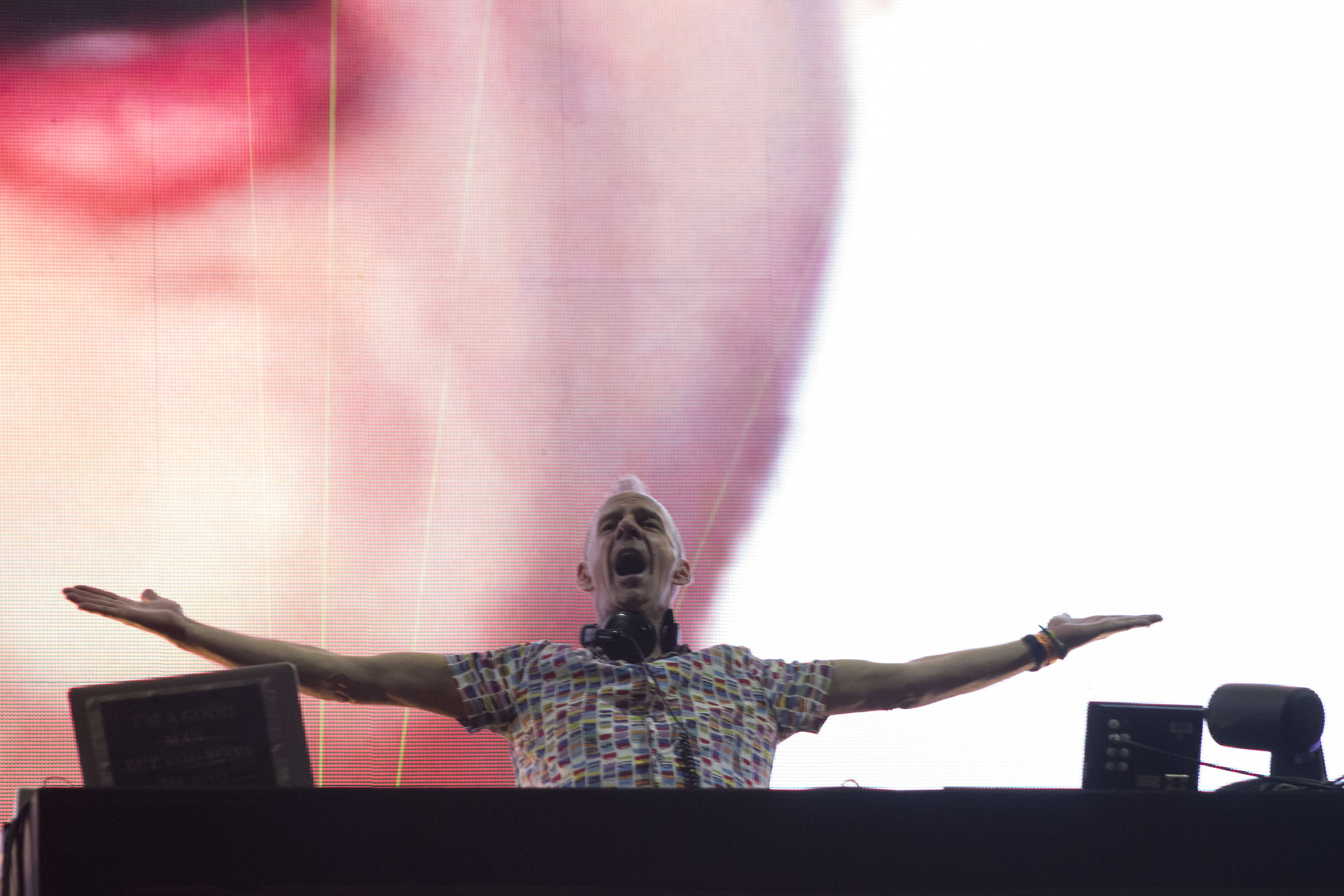
Fatboy Slim performing in Mexico City, 2017

As of 2015, Cook was performing about 70 DJ sets a year and declined many opportunities to perform more. He was not interested in further fame or success, saying, "Nowadays I'd rather go sideways than up. I don't want to do things on a bigger scale. I want to do things that are interesting." That year, he received the Alumnus Award from the University of Brighton for his contribution to the music industry and support for the university.

On 15 May 2016, Cook played a private two-hour set "Baby Loves Disco" for preschool children and their parents during the Brighton Fringe. At Glastonbury 2016, he played the John Peel stage for the first time. In 2017, he released the single "Where U Iz". At a concert in Gateshead, England, in October 2019, Cook performed a mashup of his track "Right Here, Right Now" and Greta Thunberg's speech at the United Nations, which went viral. Cook made a cameo as a DJ in the 2019 film Greed, and played himself in the third series of the Channel 4 sitcom Derry Girls, broadcast in 2022. During the COVID-19 lockdowns, Cook posted mixes online and worked at the cafe he owned in Hove, which he said "kept him sane". In May 2021, Cook performed in Liverpool as part of the government's trials to restart mass audience events following the COVID-19 pandemic. In July 2022, the 20th anniversary of Big Beach Boutique II, Cook headlined the On the Beach festival in Brighton.

Cook collaborated with the British singer Rita Ora on the 2023 single "Praising You", a reworking of his track "Praise You". At Glastonbury 2023, Cook played the song "Insomnia" by Faithless as a tribute to the Faithless singer, Maxi Jazz. That October, he was awarded the Guinness world record for the most UK number-one singles by one musician as a member of different acts. At the 77th Tony Awards in June 2024, Cook and Byrne were nominated for the Tony Award for Best Original Score for Here Lies Love. That month, Cook released the single "Role Model". The music video, his first in nearly 20 years, features celebrities edited with deepfake technology, such as David Bowie, Bill Murray and Muhammad Ali.

At Glastonbury 2024, Cook joined his former bandmate Paul Heaton to play bass on the 1986 Housemartins song "Happy Hour" . Cook estimated that his performance at Glastonbury Festival 2025 was his 100th Glastonbury performance, including performances in small tents. On 11 December, Cook released "Satisfaction Skank", a remix of "The Rockafeller Skank" incorporating elements of the 1965 Rolling Stones song "(I Can't Get No) Satisfaction". Cook had played the remix in his DJ sets for years, and it became one of the world's most bootlegged recordings. It was blocked from release until the Rolling Stones' management agreed to license its sample after several refusals.

As he grew older, Cook lost interest in creating music and focused on DJ performances, which he said he still had "100% passion for". He said in 2025: "If I did make a new record then it would be a very average record. I prefer not to waste mine or other people's time with that. I feel like I've made enough records and there's a body of work there that's good enough."

== Style ==
Cook said he combined breakbeats from hip-hop, the "anarchic rebellion" of punk, the energy of acid house and the hooks of pop music. He differentiated himself from other dance acts by using traditional song structures, such as verses, choruses and middle eights, to arrange "dance floor ingredients ... in a manner that the human brain would associate with pop music".

Cook pioneered the 1990s electronic genre big beat, which Sound on Sound likened to a "pop art-styled collage" of samples. The Pitchfork writer Brad Shoup described You've Come a Long Way, Baby as "pure pop", unlike the stranger or harsher music of other big beat acts such as the Chemical Brothers or the Prodigy. Another Pitchfork critic, Marc Hogan, characterised the Fatboy Slim formula as "eclectic samples, sloganistic vocal snippets, and an all-around drunken good-time spirit". DJ Mag wrote that Cook created "big brash party tunes for big communal occasions" and was a "showman" and entertainer.

Cook said he had never created overtly political music, and that when he tried to make "angry" music it "comes out slightly light-hearted ... so it's about the party and the rhythm". He took accusations that he "made dance music for people who don't like dance music" as a compliment, saying he had made it more accessible. He said his music was for "people who do shit jobs all week and on Friday and Saturday nights they get to be glamorous and exciting ... My music is for the hips not the head ... It's not supposed to be dissected by journalists, you're not supposed to sit at home with the lyric sheet wondering what they mean, reading the sleeve notes." Fatboy Slim tracks have been used extensively in adverts, film and television. Cook said his music suited advertising, as "you can hear 15 seconds of my stuff and it makes complete sense".

=== Method ===
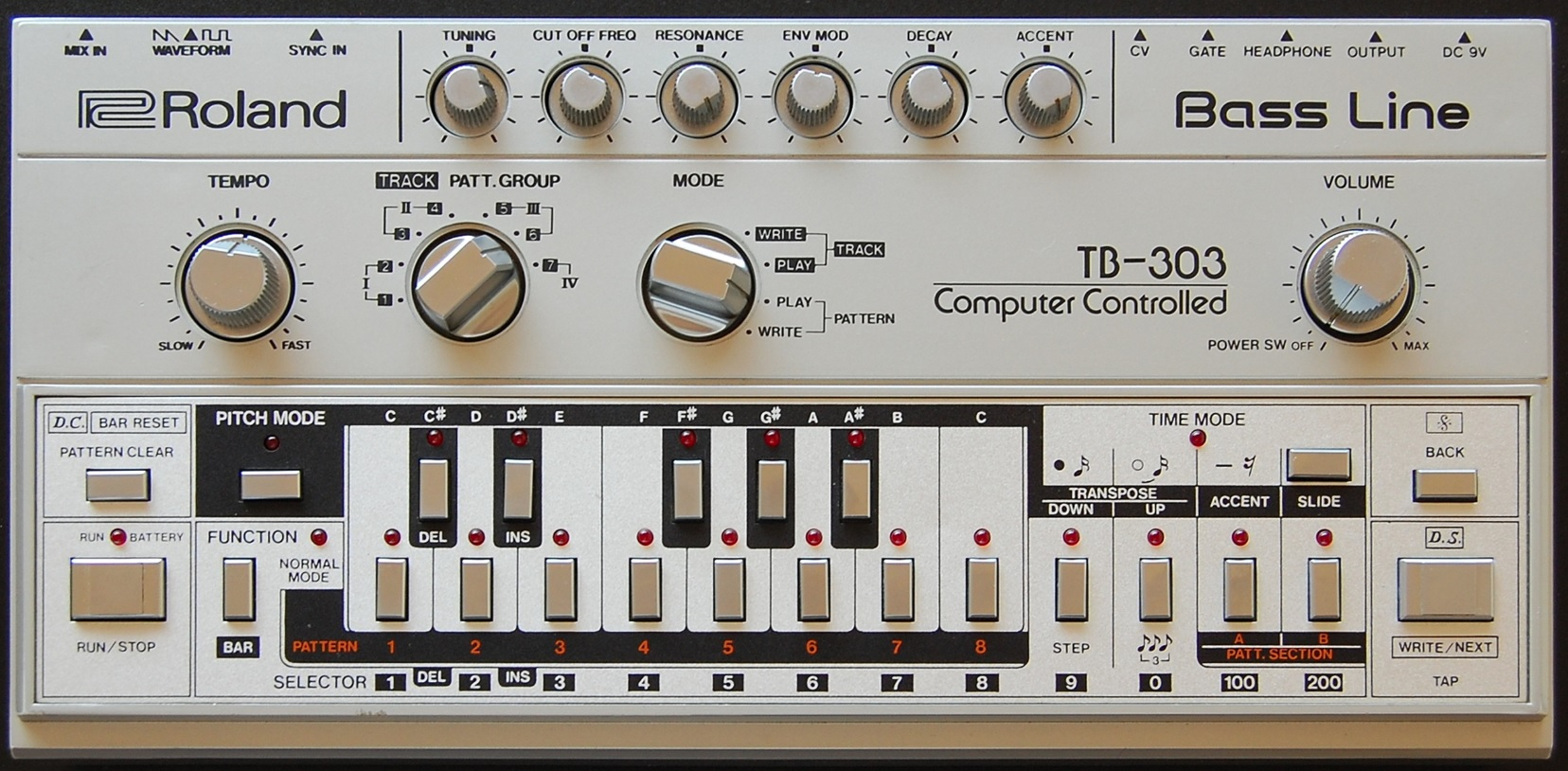
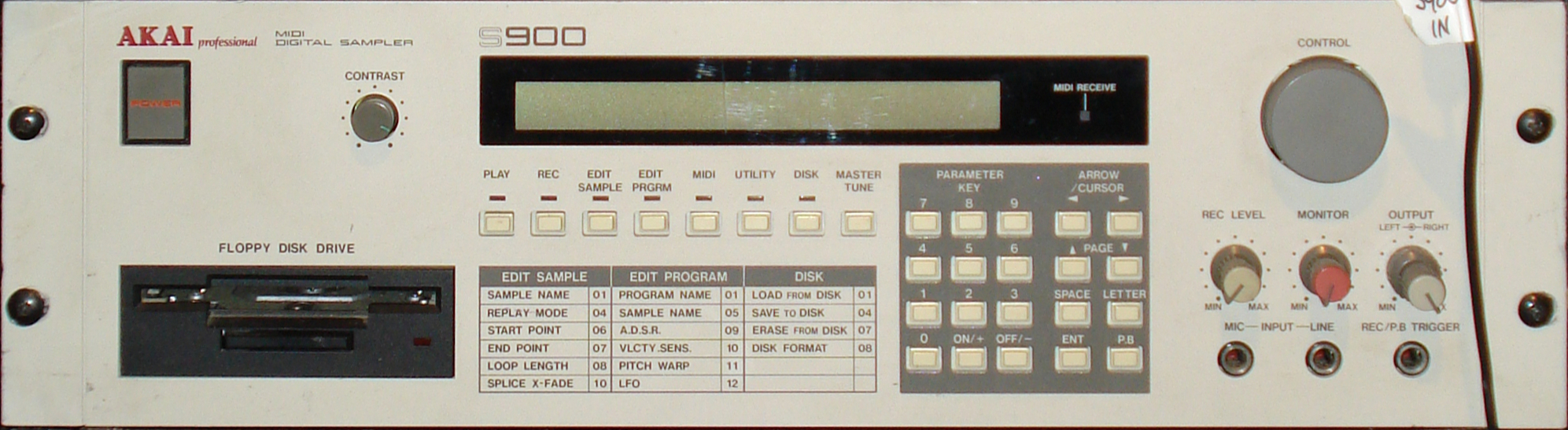

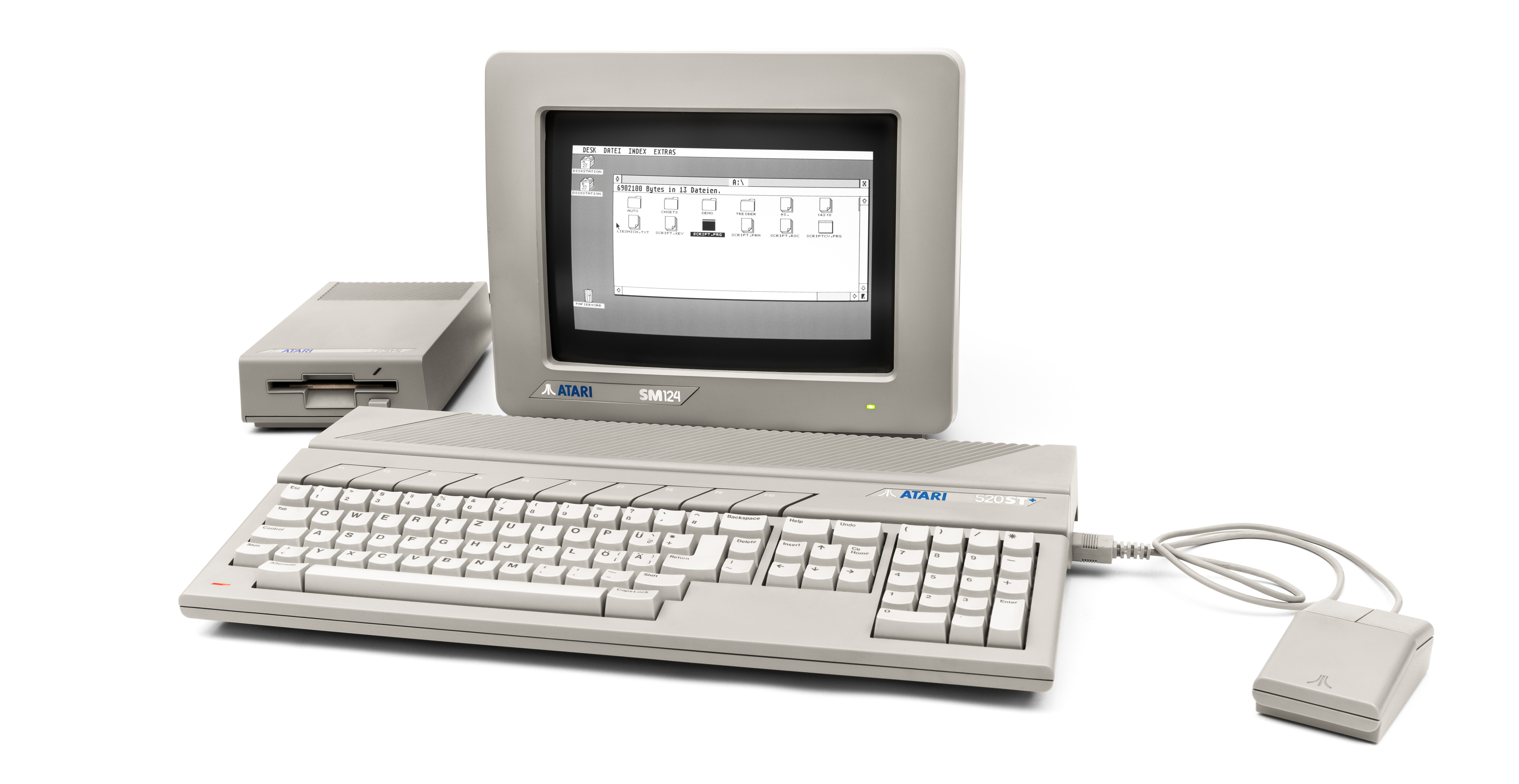
Equipment used by Fatboy Slim. From top: Roland TB-303 synthesiser, Akai S900 sampler, Atari ST computer

Cook uses samples extensively. He estimated that most of his tracks contain only 20% original material, with some containing none at all, and was proud of creating music that did not resemble the acts he sampled. As he felt sampling hit songs would be too easy, he instead sampled vocal and drum parts from obscure vinyl records, creating a library of sounds. He likened his process to collage, and enjoyed finding "that one little bit of magic" in an obscure track and turning it into a hit. Cook's approach was to blend elements from several popular styles, such as pop, punk, rap and acid house, to create "an attractive and accessible package". He said he was unable to write traditional songs.

Most Fatboy Slim albums are assembled from samples combined with parts played on Roland TB-303 and Studio Electronics SE-1 synthesisers. Cook manipulated samples through methods such as time-stretching and distortion, using Akai S900 and S950 samplers, and sequenced them using an Atari ST computer running C-Lab Creator. He created drum tracks by sampling individual drum hits from vinyl break beats, then programming new patterns. Most Fatboy Slim tracks have two drum tracks playing simultaneously: one "modern and crisp and clean-sounding" and another "older and dirtier" with less "punch". Cook continued using the same equipment even as more sophisticated technology emerged. He began using a MacBook with Ableton Live, but found the lack of limits and no opportunity to "bend the rules" made the process less exciting.

=== Live performances ===
Cook said the role of the DJ was to "orchestrate a collective euphoria". He believes DJs should communicate with the crowd through their expressions and body language and respond to them: "The more the crowd give me back, the more I wanna give them and it becomes a cycle of nonsense – sometimes to ludicrous extremes." He aimed to energise the crowd like James Brown. He described Jon Carter and Carl Cox as DJs he learned from and whose stage styles he adopted. He resisted pressure from record companies to perform with live musicians, as he felt the appeal of his music was in "the grit and character" of the samples, and to recreate them would be "like hearing a wedding covers band". He performs in Hawaiian shirts without shoes.

Cook is associated with Glastonbury Festival, where he estimated he had performed 100 times as of 2025, including performances in small tents. He said he was proud of his association with Glastonbury, which had not been "tarnished by money". Cook has never accepted payment for a Glastonbury performance.

== Charity work and activism ==
In 2008, Cook remixed the track "Amazonas" for the charity Bottletop, which funds educational projects in deprived areas. In June 2022, he gave DJ lessons as part of an NHS foundation trust initiative to create art events for people with mental health problems. As of October 2025, he had helped fund 30 workshops and the programme was set to continue for at least another year. That November, the project received the gold award in the Sussex Partnership Trust Positive Practice awards.

On 6 March 2013, Cook became the first DJ to perform at the House of Commons in aid of the Last Night a DJ Saved My Life Foundation, which encourages young people to become involved in their communities. Cook said later that it was a "milestone" to perform there years after the Criminal Justice and Public Order Act 1994, which clamped down on raves: "Isn't it brilliant that finally we've wormed our way into the public's consciousness to the extent that we're not seen as a bunch of drug-taking anarchists any more? Dance music is here to stay." In October 2023, he performed a secret gig at the Prince Albert pub in Brighton to support its campaign against property development in the North Laine.

Cook is an ambassador for Martlets Hospice in Brighton. In October 2018, he walked 26 miles, the length of a marathon, to promote the Snailspace public art project, which raised money for Martlets. He changed his name to Fatboy Slow for the event. In April 2025, he opened Martlets' refurbished charity shop in Brighton. In June 2026, Cook performed at the Pipeline in Brighton, a 60-capacity venue, to support the grassroots music scene. In July, with funds from investors including Cook, the Pipeline was purchased by Music Venue Properties, which purchases venues to protect them from closure.

== Personal life ==
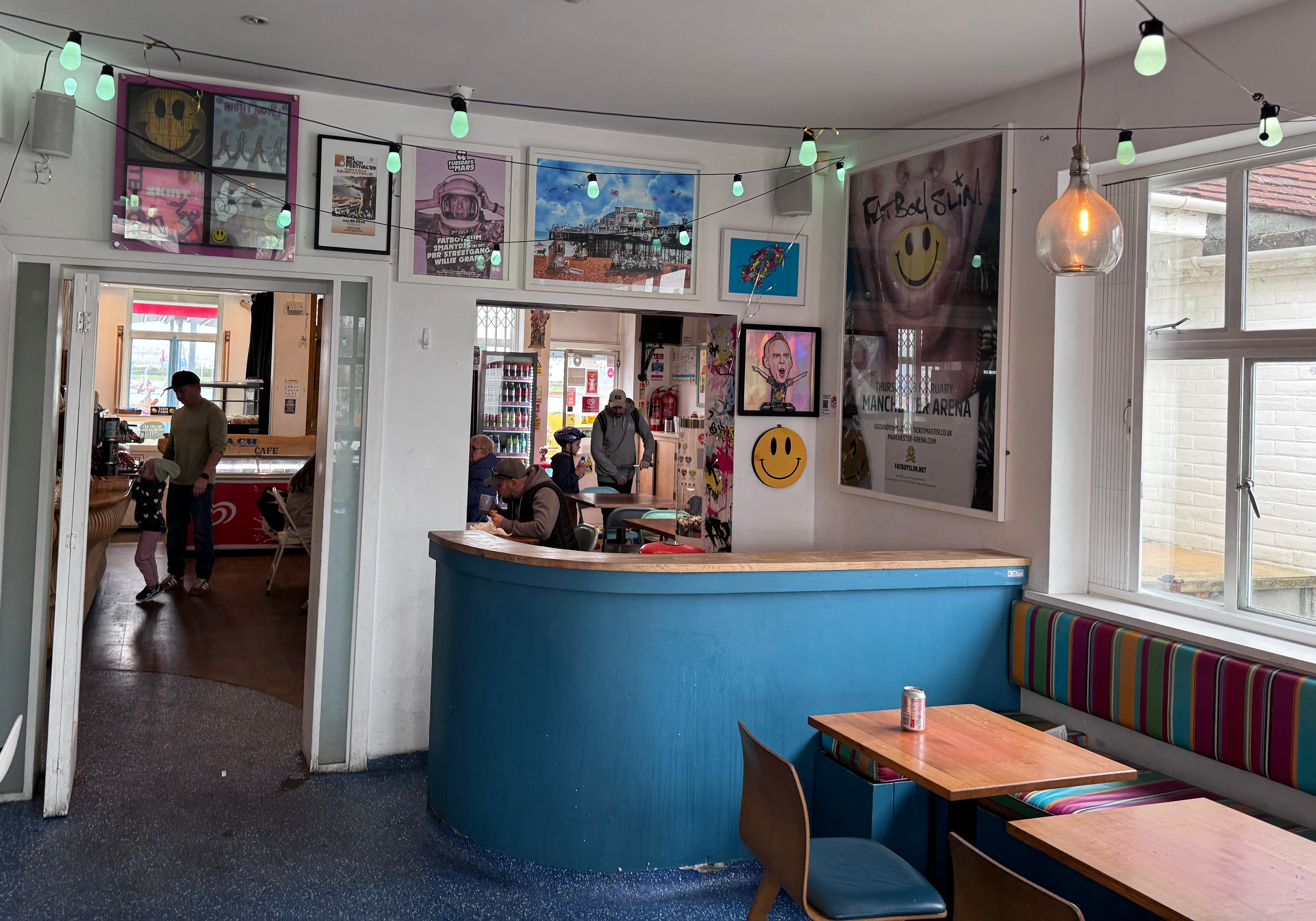
Fatboy Slim memorabilia in Cook's Big Beach Cafe, Hove, in 2025

Cook's first marriage, to a nurse, ended in the early 1990s. Cook met the BBC presenter Zoe Ball in Ibiza in 1998. They married in 1999 and had their first child in 2000. Their relationship attracted extensive tabloid attention, and Cook said he was a victim of the News International phone hacking scandal. The Independent described Cook and Ball as "the It Couple (or, one of them) of Cool Britannia". They separated in 2003, but reconciled and had a second child in 2010. As of 2004, they lived on Western Esplanade in Hove. In September 2016, Cook and Ball announced their separation after 18 years. They divorced in 2020 and remained friends.

For several years, Cook used drugs including cocaine, ecstasy and ketamine and performed while intoxicated. After he became a father, he worried that his drug use affected his relationships. After Ball threatened to leave him if he did not stop drinking, on 4 March 2009, Cook checked into a rehabilitation clinic for alcoholism. As of June 2026, he had been sober for almost 15 years. Cook said performing sober gave him stage fright for the first time.

In 2002, Cook changed his name by deed poll to Norman Quentin Cook. In the same year, he purchased a 12% share in Brighton & Hove Albion Football Club, which he has supported since moving to Brighton in the 1980s. In June 2013, Cook opened the Big Beach Cafe in Hove in a property previously owned by Heather Mills, and worked there during the COVID-19 lockdowns. He sold the cafe in November 2025, saying he no longer had time to run it as his business partner was retiring. Cook also owned a Japanese restaurant in Brighton, Oki-Nami, and co-owned the Spotted Pig, a Michelin-starred gastropub in New York City that closed in 2016. He collects objects bearing the smiley symbol, and in 2019 he curated a smiley exhibition in Lisbon with the Portuguese artist Vhils.

== Discography ==
Studio albums

- Better Living Through Chemistry (1996)
- You've Come a Long Way, Baby (1998)
- Halfway Between the Gutter and the Stars (2000)
- Palookaville (2004)
- I Think We're Gonna Need a Bigger Boat (2009) (Note: Released as a collaboration with Simon Thornton.)
- Here Lies Love (2010) (Note: Released as a collaboration with David Byrne.)
