= A Break from the Norm =

Compilation album by Norman Cook
- Released: 2001
- Recorded: various
- Genre: various
- Label: Gut
- Producer: Fatboy Slim

Fatboy Slim chronology
Halfway Between the Gutter and the Stars (2000)	A Break from the Norm (2001)	Live on Brighton Beach (2002)

Professional ratings
Review scores
Source	Rating
Allmusic	4.5/5 stars

A Break from the Norm is a compilation album arranged and released by British big beat musician Fatboy Slim, under his name of Norman Cook. It was released in 2001.

The album was released to illustrate where Cook obtained a number of his samples for famous Fatboy Slim songs, and as such most of the artists (and tracks) are relatively obscure.

== Track listing ==
	Title	Performed by	Sampled in
1	"Take Yo' Praise"	Camille Yarbrough	"Praise You"
2	"Love Loves to Love Love"	Lulu	"Santa Cruz"
3	"Higher Ground"	Ellen McIlwaine	"Song for Lindy"
4	"Shake Whatcha Mama Gave Ya"	Stik E and The Hoodz	"Ya Mama"
5	"I Can't Write Left Handed"	Bill Withers	"Demons"
6	"I Can't Explain"	Yvonne Elliman	"Going Out of My Head"
7	"Let the Rhythm Pump"	Doug Lazy	"Ya Mama"
8	"Beatbox Wash (Rinse It Rmx)"	Dust Junkys	"Gangster Trippin"
9	"Sliced Tomatoes"	Just Brothers	"The Rockafeller Skank"
10	"Young Scene"	Keith Mansfield	"Punk to Funk"
11	"Humpin', Bumpin' and Thumpin'"	Andre Willilams	"Sho Nuff"
12	"I'll Do a Little Bit More"	Olympics	"Soul Surfing"
13	"The Acid Test"	Leo Muller	"Build It Up – Tear It Down"
14	"The Beat Girl"	John Barry Seven	"The Rockafeller Skank"
15	"The Kettle"	Colosseum	"Ya Mama"
16	"Ashes, The Rain and I"	The James Gang	"Right Here, Right Now"
