= The Greatest Hits – Why Try Harder =

Greatest hits album by Fatboy Slim
- Released: 19 June 2006 (UK); 20 June 2006 (US)
- Recorded: 1996–2006
- Genre: Big beat
- Length: 65:46
- Labels: Skint (UK); Astralwerks (US); Sony BMG (Int'l)
- Producer: Fatboy Slim

Fatboy Slim chronology
Fala aí! (2006)	The Greatest Hits – Why Try Harder (2006)	The Greatest Hits – Remixed (2007)

Alternative cover
- US edition cover

Singles from The Greatest Hits – Why Try Harder
- 1. "That Old Pair of Jeans" Released: 26 June 2006; 2. "Weapon of Choice (Remix)" Released: July 2006; 3. "Champion Sound" Released: 6 November 2006

Professional ratings
Review scores
Source	Rating
AllMusic	4/5 stars
Drowned in Sound	6/10
IGN	8.9/10
musicOMH	4/5 stars
The New Zealand Herald	4/5 stars
Pitchfork	6.7/10
PopMatters	7/10
Rolling Stone	4/5 stars
The Skinny	3/5 stars
Tom Hull	A−

The Greatest Hits – Why Try Harder is a compilation album by English electronic musician Fatboy Slim, released on 19 June 2006. In addition to previously released material, the album includes two new tracks: "Champion Sound" and "That Old Pair of Jeans". A collection of music videos titled The Greatest Hits – Why Make Videos was also released in 2006. Hit singles "Ya Mama" and "Star 69" were omitted.

== Background ==
To save space on the audio disc, the songs are shorter radio edits with the exception of the final track. The profanity in "Wonderful Night" remains intact in the United Kingdom edition, but was removed for the United States. "Champion Sound" is also significantly different on the US edition, as it contains verses that are absent from the UK release.

== Cover art ==
For the UK release, the artwork for the album cover was created by Brighton artist Julie-Anne Gilburt. It features the image of the man previously used on the cover of You've Come a Long Way, Baby. Gilburt painted this cover for the greatest hits album depicting an angelic version of the man, with wings. Several images were created for this project, including a full frontal nude, and the man lounging on a sofa. These images appear in the album booklet.

For the US release, the front cover was altered to that of Christopher Walken from the "Weapon of Choice" music video. The title of the compilation comes from the slogan on the T-shirt of the man who adorns the non-US covers of both this album and You've Come a Long Way, Baby: "I'M # 1 SO WHY TRY HARDER".

== Track listing ==
No.	Title	Length
1.	"The Rockafeller Skank" (edit)	3:57
2.	"Praise You" (radio edit)	3:48
3.	"Brimful of Asha" (Norman Cook remix of Cornershop)	4:01
4.	"Weapon of Choice" (Attack Hamster edit) (featuring Bootsy Collins)	3:40
5.	"Gangster Trippin" (edit)	3:32
6.	"I See You Baby" (edit) (Fatboy Slim remix of Groove Armada featuring Gram'ma Funk)	3:30
7.	"Wonderful Night" (featuring Lateef the Truth Speaker) (US release contains clean edit)	2:45
8.	"Right Here, Right Now" (edit)	3:56
9.	"Going Out of My Head" (edit)	3:43
10.	"Sunset (Bird of Prey)" (edit)	3:59
11.	"Everybody Loves a Carnival" (radio edit)	4:05
12.	"Don't Let the Man Get You Down" (edit)	3:18
13.	"Demons" (shorter radio version) (featuring Macy Gray)	3:14
14.	"Sho Nuff" (edit)	3:21
15.	"Slash Dot Dash"	2:55
16.	"Santa Cruz" (edit)	4:18
17.	"Champion Sound" (featuring Lateef the Truth Speaker) (US release contains version with Sharon Woolf, 3:21))	3:00
18.	"That Old Pair of Jeans" (featuring Lateef the Truth Speaker)	4:44

=== The Greatest Hits – Why Make Videos DVD ===
1. "Praise You"
2. "The Rockafeller Skank"
3. "Weapon of Choice" (starring Christopher Walken)
4. "Gangster Trippin'"
5. "Wonderful Night"
6. "Right Here, Right Now"
7. "Going Out of My Head"
8. "Sunset (Bird of Prey)"
9. "Everybody Loves a Carnival"
10. "Don't Let the Man Get You Down" (swimming ending)
11. "Demons"
12. "Slash Dot Dash"
13. "Santa Cruz"
14. "Ya Mama"
15. "Star 69"
16. "The Joker"
17. "That Old Pair of Jeans"

Rare and Unseen Videos

1. "Sunset (Bird of Prey)" (directors cut)
2. "Star 69" (animated version)
3. "Everybody Needs a 303" (Pigboy)
4. "The Rockafeller Skank" (Spike Jonze audition demo version)
5. "Build It Up, Tear It Down"
- Why Make Videos (documentary)

Special bonus section

1. "Are We Having Fun Yet?" (Live from Brighton, Brazil & Brixton) (montage with album version of Love Island put underneath)

== Charts ==
=== Weekly charts ===
Chart (2006)	Peak position
Australian Albums (ARIA)	4
Austrian Albums (Ö3 Austria)	30
Belgian Albums (Ultratop Flanders)	31
Belgian Albums (Ultratop Wallonia)	45
Dutch Albums (Album Top 100)	69
Finnish Albums (Suomen virallinen lista)	31
German Albums (Offizielle Top 100)	89
Irish Albums (IRMA)	1
Italian Albums (FIMI)	72
New Zealand Albums (RMNZ)	8
Scottish Albums (Official Charts)	2
Swiss Albums (Schweizer Hitparade)	22
UK Albums (Official Charts)	2
UK Dance Albums (Official Charts)	1
UK Independent Albums (Official Charts)	1
US Top Dance Albums (Billboard)	6

=== Year-end charts ===
Chart (2006)	Position
UK Albums (OCC)	85
US Top Dance/Electronic Albums (Billboard)	18

== Certifications ==
Region	Certification	Certified units/sales
Australia (ARIA) album	Gold	35,000^{^}
Australia (ARIA) video	Gold	7,500^{^}
Ireland (IRMA)	Platinum	15,000^{^}
New Zealand (RMNZ)	Platinum	15,000^{‡}
United Kingdom (BPI)	Platinum	300,000^{^}
^{^} Shipments figures based on certification alone.^{‡} Sales+streaming figures based on certification alone.
