= List of awards and nominations received by Fatboy Slim =

Fatboy Slim awards and nominations
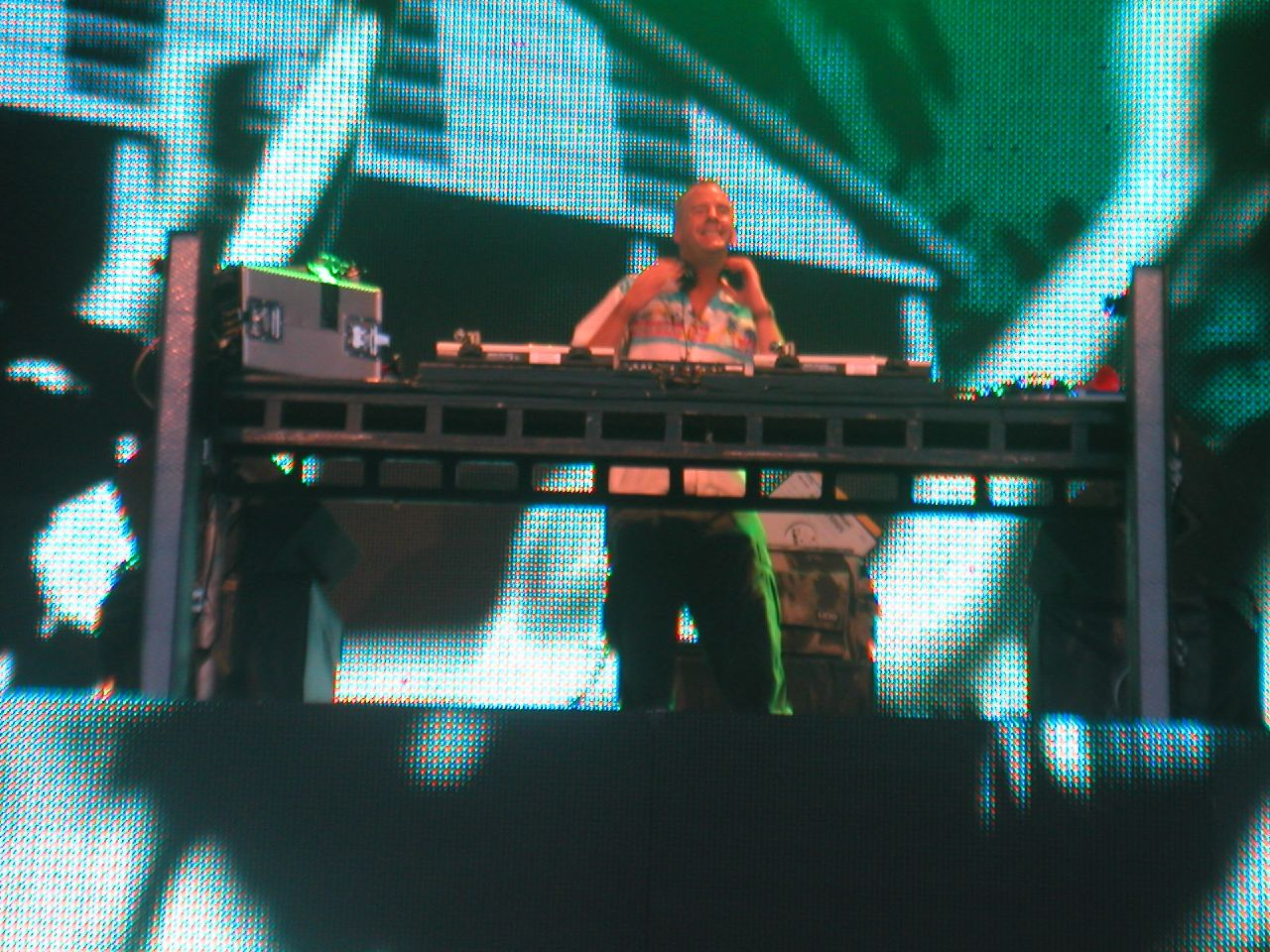
- Cook performing at the first "Beach Party" in Portrush, 2006.
Totals
Award	Wins	Nominations
Brit Awards	2	8
Grammy Awards	1	5
MPVA Awards	2	3
NME Awards	4	1
Q Awards	1	1
Teen Choice Awards	3	7
MTV Video Music Award	9	4
Awards won	19
Nominations	24

This is a list of awards and nominations received by English big beat musician Fatboy Slim. He has notably received 2 Brit Awards and 1 Grammy Award.

== Awards and nominations ==
=== ASCAP Pop Music Awards ===
Year	Nominee / work	Award	Result	Ref.
2000	"Praise You"	Most Performed Song	Won	

=== BT Digital Music Awards ===
Year	Nominee / work	Award	Result	Ref.
2004	Fatboy Slim	Best Dance Artist	Nominated	

=== Brit Awards ===
Year	Nominee / work	Award	Result
1999	Fatboy Slim	British Male Solo Artist	Nominated
1999	Fatboy Slim	British Dance Act	Won
1999	"The Rockafeller Skank"	British Single of the Year	Nominated
2000	"Praise You"	British Single of the Year	Nominated
2000	"Praise You"	British Video of the Year	Nominated
2000	Fatboy Slim	British Dance Act	Nominated
2001	Fatboy Slim	British Dance Act	Won
2001	Fatboy Slim	British Male Solo Artist	Nominated
2002	Fatboy Slim	British Dance Act	Nominated
2002	"Weapon of Choice" (featuring Bootsy Collins)	British Video of the Year	Nominated

=== DanceStar Awards ===
Year	Nominee / work	Award	Result
2001	Himself	Best Breakbeat/Eclectic Act	Won
2001	Himself	DanceStar of the Year	Nominated
2001	Himself	Best Club DJ	Nominated
2001	Halfway Between the Gutter and the Stars	Album of the Year	Nominated
2001	"Weapon of Choice"	Video of the Year	Nominated

=== Denmark GAFFA Awards ===
Delivered since 1991, the GAFFA Awards are a Danish award that rewards popular music by the magazine of the same name.

Year	Nominee / work	Award	Result	Ref.
1998	Himself	Foreign New Act	Nominated	

=== Grammy Award ===
Year	Nominee / work	Award	Result
2000	"Praise You"	Best Dance Recording	Nominated
2000	You've Come a Long Way, Baby	Best Alternative Music Album	Nominated
2002	Halfway Between the Gutter and the Stars	Best Alternative Music Album	Nominated
2002	"Weapon of Choice" (featuring Bootsy Collins)	Best Music Video	Won
2006	Palookaville	Best Dance/Electronic Album	Nominated
2006	"Wonderful Night" (featuring Lateef the Truthspeaker)	Best Dance Recording	Nominated

=== Hungarian Music Awards ===
Year	Nominee / work	Award	Result
2000	You've Come a Long Way, Baby	Best Foreign Dance Album	Nominated
2005	Palookaville	Best Foreign Dance Album	Nominated

=== MVPA Awards ===
Year	Nominee / work	Award	Result
2000	"Right Here, Right Now"	International Video of the Year	Won
2002	"Ya Mama"	International Video of the Year	Won
2005	"Don't Let the Man Get You Down"	Best Electronic Video	Won
2005	"That Old Pair of Jeans" (featuring Lateef the Truthspeaker)	Best Electronic Video	Nominated
2005	"Wonderful Night" (featuring Lateef the Truthspeaker)	Best Directional Debut	Nominated
2005	"The Joker" (featuring Bootsy Collins)	Best Pop Video	Nominated

=== NME Awards ===
Year	Nominee / work	Award	Result
1999	"The Rockafeller Skank"	Best Single	Nominated
1999	"The Rockafeller Skank"	Best Dance Recording	Won
1999	"Gangster Tripping"	Best Dance Recording	Nominated
1999	Fatboy Slim	Best Dance Act	Won
2000	Fatboy Slim	Best Dance Act	Won
2000	Fatboy Slim	Best Solo Artist	Nominated
2001	Fatboy Slim	Best Dance Act	Won
2002	"Weapon of Choice" (featuring Bootsy Collins)	Best Video	Nominated

=== Q Awards ===
Year	Nominee / work	Award	Result
2001	"Weapon of Choice" (featuring Bootsy Collins)	Best Video	Nominated
2011	Fatboy Slim	Inspiration Award	Won

=== Teen Choice Awards ===
Year	Nominee / work	Award	Result
2001	"Weapon of Choice" (featuring Bootsy Collins)	Choice Dance Track	Nominated

=== Tony Awards ===
Year	Nominee / work	Award	Result
2024	Here Lies Love	Best Original Score	Nominated

=== MTV Europe Music Award ===
Year	Nominee / work	Award	Result
1998	Fatboy Slim	Best Electronic	Nominated
1999	Fatboy Slim	Best Electronic	Won
1999	"Praise You"	Best Video	Nominated
2001	"Weapon of Choice" (featuring Bootsy Collins)	Best Video	Nominated

=== MTV Video Music Award ===
Year	Nominee / work	Award	Result
1999	"Praise You"	Best Dance Video	Nominated
1999	"Praise You"	Breakthrough Video	Won
1999	"Praise You"	Best Direction	Won
1999	"Praise You"	Best Choreography	Won
2001	"Weapon of Choice" (featuring Bootsy Collins)	Video of the Year	Nominated
2001	"Weapon of Choice" (featuring Bootsy Collins)	Best Dance Video	Nominated
2001	"Weapon of Choice" (featuring Bootsy Collins)	Breakthrough Video	Won
2001	"Weapon of Choice" (featuring Bootsy Collins)	Best Direction	Won
2001	"Weapon of Choice" (featuring Bootsy Collins)	Best Choreography	Won
2001	"Weapon of Choice" (featuring Bootsy Collins)	Best Visual Effects	Nominated
2001	"Weapon of Choice" (featuring Bootsy Collins)	Best Art Direction	Won
2001	"Weapon of Choice" (featuring Bootsy Collins)	Best Editing	Won
2001	"Weapon of Choice" (featuring Bootsy Collins)	Best Cinematography	Won

=== MTV Video Music Awards Japan ===
Year	Nominee / work	Award	Result
2002	Himself	Best Male	Nominated
2002	Himself	Best Dance	Nominated

=== World Music Awards ===
Year	Nominee / work	Award	Result
2006	Himself	World's Best DJ	Nominated
2014	"Eat, Sleep, Rave, Repeat"	World's Best Song	Nominated

=== Žebřík Music Awards ===
Year	Nominee / work	Award	Result	Ref.
1998	Himself	Best International Instrumentalist	Nominated	
1998	Himself	Best International Surprise	Nominated	
1998	"The Rockafeller Skank"	Best International Song	Nominated	
1998	"The Rockafeller Skank"	Best International Video	Nominated	
1999	Himself	Best International DJ	Won	
2000	Himself	Best International DJ	Won	
2001	Himself	Best International DJ	Won	
2001	"Weapon of Choice"	Best International Song	Nominated	
2001	"Weapon of Choice"	Best International Video	Nominated	
2002	Himself	Best International DJ	Nominated	
2003	Himself	Best International DJ	Nominated	
2004	Himself	Best International DJ	Won	
2005	Himself	Best International DJ	Nominated	
2006	Himself	Best International DJ	Nominated	
2007	Himself	Best International DJ	Nominated	

=== DJ magazine Top 100 DJs ===
Year	Position	Notes	Ref.
as Norman Cook
1997	39	New Entry	
1998	16	Up 23	
as Fatboy Slim
1999	7	Up 9 / New Entry	
2000	28	Down 21	
2001	21	Up 7	
2002	22	Down 1	
2003	43	Down 21	
2004	51	Down 8	
2005	63	Down 12	
2006	80	Down 17	
2007	66	Up 14	
2008	92	Down 26	
2009	94	Down 2	
2010	82	Up 12	
Hiatus
2012	135	Out	
Hiatus
2015	144	Out	
2016	145	Out (Down 1)	
2017	150	Out (Down 5)	
2018	140	Out (Up 10)	
2019	109	Out (Up 31)	

=== Other ===
- Ivor Novello Award for Outstanding Contribution to British Music (2007)
- Silver Clef Award for Icon Award (2012)

Cook was a judge for the 6th annual Independent Music Awards to support independent artists' careers.

In February 2015, Cook was given the University of Brighton's Alumnus Award for his contribution to the music industry and his support for the institution where he studied in the 1980s.
