= That Old Pair of Jeans =

2006 single by Fatboy Slim

Single by Fatboy Slim featuring Lateef the Truth Speaker

from the album The Greatest Hits – Why Try Harder
- Released: 26 June 2006
- Genre: Hip hop
- Length: 4:43
- Label: Skint; Astralwerks
- Songwriters: Norman Cook, Lateef Daumont, Kevin Michael Kelly, Labi Siffre
- Producer: Fatboy Slim

Fatboy Slim singles chronology
"Don't Let the Man Get You Down" (2005)	"That Old Pair of Jeans" (2006)	"Weapon of Choice (Remix)" (2006)

Lateef the Truth Speaker singles chronology
"Wonderful Night" (2004)	"That Old Pair of Jeans" (2006)	"Enuff" (2006)

"That Old Pair of Jeans" is a song by English electronic music producer Fatboy Slim, released on 26 June 2006 as a single from his greatest hits album The Greatest Hits – Why Try Harder. It features vocals from American rapper Lateef the Truth Speaker.

== Track listing ==
CD

No.	Title	Length
1.	"That Old Pair of Jeans"	4:46
2.	"Praise You" (Ad-Rock and Mike D remix)	3:31
3.	"Right Here, Right Now" (Redanka's 66 vocal remix)	5:39
4.	"Right Here, Right Now" (Freemasons remix)	5:40
5.	"That Old Pair of Jeans" (video)

7"

No.	Title	Length
1.	"That Old Pair of Jeans"	4:46
2.	"Praise You" (Ad-Rock and Mike D remix)	3:31

12"

No.	Title	Length
1.	"That Old Pair of Jeans"	4:46
2.	"Right Here, Right Now" (Freemasons club mix)	5:40
3.	"Everybody Needs a 303" (Plump DJs remix)	6:03
4.	"Right Here, Right Now" (Redanka's 66 vocal remix)	5:39

== Music video ==
Fatboy Slim commissioned comedian and juggler Chris Bliss to perform to the song in front of a live theatre audience for a music video. The video expanded into a MySpace contest to "Juggle to music like Chris Bliss". The entries were narrowed down to eleven entries including one non-juggling entry directed by Steve Glashier featuring Australian hula-hooper Angie Mack (née Humphries). John Augustus "Gus" Tate won the competition and Angie Mack received honourable mention as the "Non-Juggling Winner" as the video so impressed Fatboy Slim.

== Charts ==
Chart (2006)	Peak Position
UK Singles Chart	39
