= Champion Sound (disambiguation) =

Champion Sound is a 2003 album by J Dilla and Madlib. Other instances of Champion Sound include:

- Champion Sounds, 2003 album by Roc Raida
- "Champion Sound" (song), 2006 song by Fatboy Slim
- "Champion Sound", 2023 song by Davido from the album Timeless
- "Champion Sound", 2024 song by Ghostface Killah from the album Set the Tone (Guns & Roses)
- Champion Sound (Faithless album), 2025 album by Faithless
