= Don't Think Twice (disambiguation) =

Don't Think Twice may refer to:

- "Don't Think Twice, It's All Right", a 1963 song by Bob Dylan
- Don't Think Twice (album), a 1970 album by Waylon Jennings
- Don't Think Twice, a 2016 film
- "Don't Think Twice" (Hikaru Utada song), a 2018 song by Hikaru Utada used as the theme song to Kingdom Hearts III
- "Don't Think Twice" (Rita Ora song), a 2023 song by Rita Ora
