= Akira (unproduced film) =

Planned American cyberpunk action film

Akira is a cancelled live action cyberpunk action film based on the manga series Akira by Katsuhiro Otomo. The film has been in development hell for decades, with productions struggling to move beyond pre-production stages and numerous writers and directors having been attached and later removed from the project.

Warner Bros. held the rights to a live-action version adaptation of the manga from 2002 through 2025. Their final attempt attached Taika Waititi to direct the film with a 2021 release date, but Waititi's commitments to other films continually delayed the project. In June 2025, The Hollywood Reporter detailed that Warner Bros. declined to renew the film rights, reverting them back to manga publisher Kodansha; it is expected that the bidding process would begin new with other producers and talent.

== Premise ==
A secret military project endangers Neo-Tokyo when it turns a biker gang member into a rampaging psychic psychopath that only two teenagers and a group of psychics can stop.

== Production ==
=== Sony ===
In the 1990s, following the release of the 1988 anime film, Sony Pictures obtained the rights to the Akira manga series with the intent of creating a live-action adaptation. This project ultimately never came to fruition.

=== Warner Bros. ===
In 2002, Warner Bros. acquired the rights to create a live-action Akira film as a seven-figure deal. However, the project consistently faced a troubled development, with at least five different directors and ten different writers attached over more than two decades of pre-production, spending tens of millions of dollars across the various attempts.

In a 2017 analysis, IGN concluded that the long-term troubles with producing the live-action film primarily came from two areas. Firstly, there has been the fear of whitewashing or racebending, casting American or other Western actors in lieu of Japanese ones, which has frequently come to light when such actors have been reported as under consideration for these roles. Secondly, Akira itself is not considered a story that is easy to relocate outside of Japan, due to the heavy influence on the original story of Japan's role in World War II, including the atomic bombings of Japan, and their own Unit 731. Attempts to make it more Westernized in order to draw American audiences, such as using the September 11 attacks as part of the establishing events instead of the atomic bombings, required fundamental changes to the story, which has subsequently drawn much criticism.

==== Stephen Norrington ====
In Apr 2002, shortly after Warner Bros. acquired the rights, Stephen Norrington was slated to direct with James Robinson writing the screenplay and Dan Lin producing. Planned changes included setting the film in Chicago, as well as making Kaneda and Tetsuo brothers. However, following the disappointing performance of Norrington and Robinson's film The League of Extraordinary Gentlemen, the project was put on hold.

==== Ruairí Robinson ====
Director Ruairí Robinson was hired in 2008, with Gary Whitta as screenwriter; they planned to split Akira across two films, with the first to be completed and released by 2009. Producer Andrew Lazar specified that the two movies would each cover three volumes of the six-volume manga.

Whitta had been told that Otomo had instructed those working on the film "to not be afraid to change things, that he wanted to see an original and different interpretation, not just a straight-up remake". His script re-centered the story in New York: after the destructive Akira incident destroys Manhattan, the US economy nearly collapses. Out of desperation, the government leases the now-vacant land to Japan, which has become an economic powerhouse and is struggling with overpopulation; this city of Japanese citizens built on formerly American land becomes New Tokyo. This would have allowed them to have used a mixture of Western and Asian cultures and actors so as to avoid concerns that they would be whitewashing the project.

Concept art for Robinson's 2008 production featured Chris Evans as Kaneda against Joseph Gordon-Levitt as Travis (Tetsuo), though it is unclear if either actor was actually attached to the project.

==== Hughes brothers ====
Robinson left the project in 2009, replaced as director by Albert and Allen Hughes in 2010. They used Whitta's script, with additional rewrites by Mark Fergus and Hawk Ostby, with plans to aim for a PG-13 rating for the two-part film.

In 2011, versions of the Akira script began to surface online. In February, selections from an older draft of the screenplay were sent to casting agencies and circulated online, providing glimpses at changes the adaptation was making: the setting of Neo-Manhattan rather than Neo Tokyo, Kaneda and Tetsuo as siblings rather than friends, and an increased focus on the gang's use and trafficking of drugs. A full script, from a different draft than the casting sheets, leaked online later that year; though it was unclear precisely which screenwriter(s) had produced it, the scripts were criticized for deviating significantly from the source material: siblings Kaneda and Tetsuo were now in their early 30s and no longer bikers, Akira was a murderous evil child comparable to a horror villain, and Kei's supporting role was downplayed to a simpler love interest. The American setting also drew criticism for its heavy-handed references to the September 11 attacks and whitewashing in the casting calls (particularly with the renaming of Tetsuo to "Travis"). Shortly after these events, the Hughes brothers left the project, citing "amicable creative differences".

==== Jaume Collet-Serra ====
In July 2011, Jaume Collet-Serra was hired to direct, with Steve Kloves providing revision work on a draft by screenwriter Albert Torres. The film was greenlit in October 2011, with filming eyed to begin by February or March 2012.

The casting process for Akira had already begun under the Hughes brothers' iteration, and continued under Collet-Serra. Actors considered for Kaneda included James Franco, Robert Pattinson, and Keanu Reeves; Garrett Hedlund emerged as the frontrunner for the role and began negotiations in November. Kristen Stewart was offered the role of Ky Reed (Kei) shortly after Hedlund was cast. Gary Oldman was offered the role of the Colonel, after Oldman passed on the project, the role was then offered to Ken Watanabe. Helena Bonham Carter and Keira Knightley were approached for unspecified roles. Tetsuo was not cast before the production halted; Paul Dano, Alden Ehrenreich, and Toby Kebbell were among those screen tested.

In January 2012, as production was gearing up to begin in Vancouver, Warner Bros. halted production, citing issues with casting, the script and the budget. Collet-Serra would depart the film during this time, but would return in August 2013. He detailed his vision for the film in February 2014, stating that it would be respectful of the source material, but would still have differences. New drafts of the screenplay were completed by Dante Harper in 2014 and Marco Ramirez in July 2015. By 2017, Collett-Serra was no longer attached to the project.

During this interim period, Warner Bros. sought new directors to take over the film; George Miller and Jordan Peele were both offered the project, but declined.

==== Taika Waititi ====
In September 2017, it was announced that director Taika Waititi was in talks to direct. In May 2019, Waititi was officially confirmed to direct the film, and would be co-writing the script with Michael Golamco, with a release date of May 21, 2021. Filming was scheduled to have commenced in California in July 2019. Taika Waititi had planned to adapt the original six-volume manga, rather than directly remaking the anime film. He also asserted an intention to cast Asian-American teenagers to play the leads to avoid concerns over whitewashing, preferring lesser-known actors for the roles.

However, Waititi was announced to direct Thor: Love and Thunder on July 16, 2019 – Akira was once again put on hold, removed from the Warner Bros. release schedule in December 2019. Waititi's continued connection to the project became uncertain, as the director continued to take on additional projects that would delay Akira even further. Though Waititi would reaffirm his commitment to Akira over the years, as of late 2023 Akira had yet to move beyond the writing stage (with Charles Yu having taken over script duties).

In June 2025, Warner Bros. declined to renew the rights to the live-action film, implicitly ending Waititi's involvement with the project as the rights returned to Akira manga publisher Kodansha. According to The Hollywood Reporter, by this point the studio's attempts to make a live-action Akira had reached an eight-digit figure; with the rights reversion, multiple interested parties were discussing acquiring the rights with Kodansha.
