= MC Tunes =

British rapper (born 1970)

- Also known as: Nicky Lockett
- Born: Nicholas William Dennis Hodgson; 28 March 1970 (age 55); Moss Side, Manchester, England
- Genres: Hip hop, Madchester
- Occupations: Rapper, songwriter
- Years active: 1986–present
- Labels: ZTT

Nicholas William Dennis Hodgson (born 28 March 1970), also known as MC Tunes, is an English rapper from the Moss Side area in Manchester. His name was legally changed to Lockett in 1981, and he also goes by the name Nicky Lockett. Tunes played a significant role in the Madchester-music scene during the 1980s and 1990s. In his early career Tunes took niche music genres into the UK Singles Chart, whilst fronting 808 State, and later achieved cult status with the rap rock band Dust Junkys.

In April 2014, it was announced that Damage by Stereo, Tunes' 'lost' second album was to be finally released.

== 808 State ==
Tunes first worked with 808 State on the 1990 album The North at Its Heights (ZTT Records). The album was a moderate success, reaching number 26 in the UK Albums Chart, and also saw European and Japanese releases. It spawned three UK singles that entered the UK Singles Chart: "The Only Rhyme That Bites" (ZTT, 1990) reached number 10 and again (ZTT, 1992) reached number 47, "Tunes Splits The Atom" (ZTT, 1990) number 18 and "Primary Rhyming" (ZTT, 1990) peaked at number 67 – this was also the first of the singles to have the 'versus 808 State' wording removed from the cover credits. Each single was supported by a promotional video. On 19 November 2011 a deluxe edition of The North at Its Heights was released by ZTT Records in Japan, due to a resurgence of interest in this work. The release featured seven additional tracks including "Dance Yourself To Death" – Dust Bros club mix: remixed by the Dust Bros; and a remake of "The Only Rhyme That Bites" – Ugly as Sin mix: remixed and remodelled by Tunes for the release.

In 1992, Tunes recorded the single "Digital Bad Boy" / "Could You Understand" (Juice Box) with A Guy Called Gerald.

'The Only Rhyme That Bites' video was recorded in the basement of the old Express Newspapers building on Great Ancoats Street.

== Damage by Stereo ==
With the success of the 808 State collaborations and his growing reputation on the global hip hop scene, ZTT Records signed a separate deal with MC Tunes. With the project being overseen by Trevor Horn, recording began at Sarm Studios on a series of tracks in 1991. The result was nine tracks which, with an addition of a new version of "Dance Yourself To Death" produced by the Dust Brothers, were intended to be released in album format under the title Damage by Stereo. It is unclear why at the time of its making the album was not released but, in 2012, the entire collection of missing master tapes were rediscovered.

In April 2014, it was announced that "Damage by Stereo" was to be released by Peter Hook's Haçienda Records label.

Tracks from the album were previewed in an event at Factory Manchester on Saturday 19 April in an event hosted by Clint Boon of XFM and Inspiral Carpets billed as an evening of talk, tape and performance. The music was played from the original half-inch master tapes which had been treated by Advanced Media Restoration in Manchester and played from a reel to reel machine. The event also saw MC Tunes performing material over instrumental versions of the tracks retrieved from the tapes. As no album art had been prepared for the original release, Mancunian artist Jay Smith provided the backdrop for the stage as he painted the cover art for Damage by Stereo. Filmmaker and director Richard Alexander produced a short film prior to the event, detailing the musician's cultural impact on popular culture since his arrival on the scene, called 23 Years Late: Damage By Stereo.

On 9 February 2015, Damage By Stereo was eventually released, almost 24 years after it was originally recorded. The album was made available on a limited edition double CD, Serial Number HAC018, featuring the 10 original tracks intended for the album and a five track bonus disc featuring dance remixes by 808 State's Andy Barker, DJ & Producer Mark Wells, the Dust Brothers, TtrueAR and The Laboratory Project. Two slightly different versions of the CD were manufactured. One hundred copies were created for guests at the official album launch party held at South Manchester, with another limited batch of CDs being produced for general release. The album was also made available digitally through Hacienda Records and on various other digital platforms including iTunes and Spotify. MC Tunes released "Dance Yourself To Death" with 808 State and The Dust Brothers on 4 November 2022.

== Dust Junkys ==
Following the stalling of his solo career, Tunes formed the Dust Junkys in 1995, with Sam Brox on guitar, Stephen "OJ" Oliver Jones on bass guitar, Mykey Wilson on drums and Ganiyu Pierre Gasper on turntables. The band concentrated on gigging in the Manchester area and then national tours, building audiences for their mix of British hip hop and rock music.

Whilst gigging with the Dust Junkys, Tunes returned to work with 808 State in 1996 on a new track, "Pump", taken from their album Thermo Kings (Warner). It was due to be released as a single, but this never happened. The Dust Junkys were signed to Polydor and released their first single "Living in the Pocket of a Drug Queen?" (1997), followed by "(Nonstopoperation)" and "What Time Is It?" which reached number 39 in the UK chart. The Dust Junkys music was subject to remixes by artists such as Fun Loving Criminals. The track "Fever" was featured on the soundtrack for the Sony PlayStation game, Driver 2.

The most widely recognized piece of Dust Junkys music, originally called "Rinse (Beatbox Wash)", released as the B-side of "Living in the Pocket of a Drug Queen?", came to prominence as the main hook of Fatboy Slim's "Gangster Trippin'". The track peaked at number 3 in the UK Singles Chart. "Gangster Trippin'" was also featured on the Fatboy Slim album You've Come a Long Way, Baby, where 25% of the songwriting credits were attributed to Dust Junkys and MC Tunes.

== Filmography ==
In 1990, ZTT Records commissioned film maker Howard Walmsley to create a film to promote MC Tunes music career. This became the foundation for a film called Nish Clish Banging, The MC Tunes Tapes which was completed in 2011, and shown in art house cinemas in the North West of England. The University of Central Lancashire screened the film to a capacity crowd at the Mitchell and Kenyon cinema in Preston, Lancashire, on 15 November 2012. The screening was followed by Terry Christian conducting an interview with Lockett and Walmsley, and a question and answer session with the audience. In the interview, Tunes candidly talked about the controversy that had surrounded his career and personal life.

In addition to being featured in music promotional films, in 2007 Tunes played himself in the independent feature film, Diary of a Bad Lad.

== Discography ==
=== MC Tunes ===
==== Albums ====
- The North at Its Heights (ZTT, 1990)
- Damage by Stereo (Hacienda Records, 2015)

==== Singles ====
- "The Only Rhyme That Bites" (ZTT, 1990)
- "Tunes Splits the Atom" (ZTT, 1990)
- "Primary Rhyming" (ZTT, 1990)
- "The Only Rhyme That Bites" (re-issue) (ZTT, 1992)
- "The Only Rhyme That Bites '99" (ZTT, 1999)
- "The Only Rhyme That Bites '99(17 Remastered)" (ZTT, 2017)

=== Dust Junkys ===
==== Albums ====
- Done and ...Dusted (Polydor, 1998)
- Done and ...Dusted Special Edition/Dub and ...Dusted (Polydor, 1998)
- Reboot: Redone and Dusted (WikiBeats, 2018)

==== Singles ====
- "Living in the Pocket of a Drug Queen?" (Polydor, 1997)
- "(Nonstopoperation)" (Polydor, 1997)
- "What Time is It?" (Polydor, 1998)
- "Nothin' Personal" (Polydor, 1998) Chart No. 62
