= You & I (Rita Ora album) =

Studio album by Rita Ora
- Released: 14 July 2023
- Recorded: 2022
- Genre: Pop
- Length: 33:52
- Label: BMG
- Producers: Yoshi Breen; Serban Cazan; Cirkut; Oak Felder; Nick Hahn; Jason OK; Kilian & Jo; Alex Niceforo; Mark Ralph; Jon Shave; Keith Sorrells; Lewis Thompson

Rita Ora chronology
Bang (2021)	You & I (2023)

Singles from You & I
- 1. "You Only Love Me" Released: 27 January 2023; 2. "Praising You" Released: 19 April 2023; 3. "Don't Think Twice" Released: 30 June 2023; 4. "Shape of Me" Released: 29 January 2024

You & I is the third studio album by the British singer Rita Ora. It was released on 14 July 2023 through BMG. The album is her first solo studio release since Phoenix (2018). You & I spawned three singles: "You Only Love Me", "Praising You" (featuring Fatboy Slim), and "Don't Think Twice".

Upon release the album received generally positive reviews from music critics. Commercially the album peaked a top the UK independent albums chart as well as becoming her second consecutive top ten and third consecutive top twenty debut on the UK albums chart where it reached number six.

== Background and release ==
I spent such a long time fighting to be heard over the course of my experience being in the industry, that I guess I lost a lot of confidence and a lot of hope, fell really low. And I guess when you're at your lowest point, you can make a choice. You either kind of get back up and keep going, or you just let it consume you. And I did that. I got up. [...] This album really means a lot to me. It's like my diary of the last few years, it's my sound and it just feels so true to me and who I am today. I think this record means something different for everyone, but from my perspective, it's about praising your loved ones and really celebrating those relationships.

— Rita Ora on You & I

After the publication of her second studio album Phoenix in 2018, Ora took a recording break, embarking on several television and film projects. In February 2022, Ora signed a record deal with Berlin-based BMG, a deal which gave her ownership of master recordings for her next projects. In April 2023, she announced the release of her third studio album, titled You & I.

== Singles ==
"You Only Love Me" was announced on 11 January as the lead single from the album and released on 27 January 2023. "Praising You" was released on 19 April 2023, as the second single. The song is a re-worked version of Fatboy Slim's song "Praise You", and Slim is also credited as featured artist on the song, and became a hit song after it was featured in Ruby Gillman, Teenage Kraken. "Don't Think Twice" was released as the album's third single on 30 June 2023.

== Critical reception ==
Professional ratings
Aggregate scores
Source	Rating
Metacritic	68/100
Review scores
Source	Rating
AllMusic	4/5 stars
Clash	7/10
Evening Standard	2/5 stars
i	3/5 stars
The Independent	2/5 stars
The Irish Times	3/5 stars
Irish Examiner	4/5 stars
Rolling Stone UK	3/5 stars
The Telegraph	3/5 stars

You & I received a score of 68 out of 100 on review aggregator Metacritic based on five critics' reviews, indicating "generally favorable" reception. Emma Harrison of Clash wrote that the album is Ora's "most exploratory and undoubtedly her finest work so far" with "the trademark sass and joie de vivre throughout, but this feels like a more mature and evolved body of work". Harrison also pointed out that "Rita uses You & I to undertake some serious self-reflection with each track focusing on various aspects" and that it allows her to "shed her skin to show [more] vulnerability and creativity than before".

Hannah Mylrea of Rolling Stone UK wrote that You & I "play[s] it safe" compared to Ora's previous albums, because "too often [...] the tracks wash over you as shiny pop songs that fail to draw intrigue". Helen Brown from The Independent was less impressed by the album, remarking that it is "strong enough to sell well" and although "sweet and ought to let us into the specifics of her world [...] still it feels generic". David Smyth of the Evening Standard wrote that the project "lacks personal touch".

== Track listing ==
You & I – Standard edition
No.	Title	Lyrics	Music	Producer(s)	Length
1.	"Don't Think Twice"	Rita Ora; Nate Cyphert	Warren Felder; Alex Niceforo; Jamie Sanderson; Keith Sorrells; Rollo	Niceforo; Sorrells; Mark Ralph; Oak Felder	3:06
2.	"You Only Love Me"	Ora; Ellie Campbell; Phoebe Jasper	Rory Adams; Jonathan Maguire; Corey Sanders; Lewis Thompson	Thompson; Felder; Cameron Gower-Poole^{[v]}	2:28
3.	"Praising You" (featuring Fatboy Slim)	Ora; Georgia Ku; Karen Poole	Serban Cazan; Norman Cook; Jon Shave; Camille Yarbrough	Cazan; Felder; Shave	2:44
4.	"Unfeel It"	Ora; Rollo Spreckley	Felder; Niceforo; Sorrells; Spreckley	Niceforo; Sorrells; Ralph; Felder	2:41
5.	"Waiting for You"	Ora; René Miller	Asdis Vioarsdottir; Johannes Burger; Kilian Wilke	Kilian & Jo; Felder; Gower-Poole^{[v]}	2:43
6.	"You & I"	Ora; Rollo	Johnny Murray; Henry Walter	Cirkut; Felder	3:00
7.	"That Girl"	Ora; Sorana Păcurar; Rollo	Felder; Rick James; Niceforo; Sorrells; Rollo	Felder	3:01
8.	"Shape of Me"	Ora; Rollo	Jenna Andrews; Felder; Niceforo; Rollo; Sorrells	Niceforo; Sorrells; Ralph; Felder	2:29
9.	"Look at Me Now"	Ora; Georgia Meek	Yoshi Breen; Jason OK; Georgia Meek	Jason OK; Breen; Ollie Green^{[v]}	2:45
10.	"Girl in the Mirror"	Ora; Rollo	Felder; Niceforo; Rollo; Sorrells	Niceforo; Sorrells; Felder	3:11
11.	"Notting Hill"	Ora; Rollo	Felder; Niceforo; Rollo; Sorrells	Niceofor; Sorrells; Felder	2:30
12.	"I Don't Wanna Be Your Friend"	Ora	Ora; Nick Hahn	Hahn	3:14
Total length:					33:52

You & I – Deluxe edition
No.	Title	Lyrics	Music	Producer(s)	Length
13.	"Love Die Repeat"	Ora; Speckley	Bentley; Fedler	Bentley; Fedler	2:33
14.	"Rest of My Life"	Ora; Speckley	Fedler; Sorrells; Niceforo	Fedler; Sorrells; Niceforo	2:35
Total length:					39:00

You & I – Digital bonus edition
No.	Title	Length
15.	"You Only Love Me" (Shift K3Y Remix)	2:24
16.	"You Only Love Me" (featuring Nafe Smallz; Zdot Remix)	2:28
17.	"Praising You" (featuring Fatboy Slim; Fatboy Slim Remix)	4:21
18.	"Praising You" (featuring Fatboy Slim; Dopamine Remix)	2:19
19.	"Praising You" (featuring Fatboy Slim; Jodie Harsh Remix)	2:32
Total length:		53:04

Note

- ^{^[v]} signifies a vocal producer

== Personnel ==
Musicians

- Rita Ora – lead vocals (all tracks), backing vocals (track 12)
- Oak Felder – bass guitar, drum programming (1); keyboards, programming (4, 8, 10, 11)
- Keith Sorrells – drum programming, guitar (1, 4, 7, 8, 10, 11)
- Alex Niceforo – guitar, keyboards, programming (1, 4, 7, 8, 10, 11)
- Zaire Koalo – drum programming (1)
- Downtown Trevor Brown – guitar, programming (1)
- Davide Rossi – string arrangement, strings (1)
- Taika Waititi – backing vocals (2)
- Jon Shave – additional vocals, keyboards, programming (3)
- Karen Poole – additional vocals (3)
- Georgia Ku – additional vocals (3)
- Serban Cazan – keyboards, programming (3)
- Asdis Vioarsdottir – backing vocals (5)
- Johannes Burger – drums, keyboards, programming (5)
- Kilian Wilke – drums, keyboards, programming (5)
- Cirkut – instrumentation, programming (6)
- Sorana Păcurar – backing vocals (7)
- Yoshi Breen – backing vocals, choir, keyboards, piano, programming, synthesizer (9)
- Jason OK – backing vocals, keyboards, piano, programming, synthesizer (9)
- Georgia Meek – backing vocals, choir, chorus arrangement (9)
- Roland Spreckley – piano (11)
- Nick Hahn – bass guitar, guitar, keyboards, programming (12)

Technical

- Dick Beetham – mastering
- Mark Ralph – engineering (1–3, 5, 7, 10, 11)
- Oak Felder – engineering (1, 4, 7, 8, 10)
- Oscar Linnander – engineering (1, 4, 7, 8, 10, 11)
- Lewis Thompson – engineering (2)
- Cameron Gower-Poole – engineering (2, 5)
- Jon Shave – engineering (3)
- Sam Button – engineering (3)
- Serban Cazan – engineering (3)
- Felipe Gutierrez – engineering (5)
- Kilian & Jo – engineering (5)
- Cirkut – engineering (6)
- Jason OK – engineering (9)
- Nick Hahn – engineering (12)
- Trevor Muzzy – engineering (12)

== Charts ==
Chart performance for You & I
Chart (2023)	Peak position
Austrian Albums (Ö3 Austria)	45
Belgian Albums (Ultratop Flanders)	53
Belgian Albums (Ultratop Wallonia)	69
French Physical Albums (SNEP)	102
German Albums (Offizielle Top 100)	19
Irish Independent Albums (IRMA)	14
Polish Albums (ZPAV)	69
Scottish Albums (Official Charts)	7
Spanish Albums (Promusicae)	78
Swiss Albums (Schweizer Hitparade)	25
UK Albums (Official Charts)	6
UK Independent Albums (Official Charts)	1

== Release history ==
Release dates and formats for You & I
Region	Date	Format(s)	Edition	Label	Ref.
Various	14 July 2023	CD; digital download; LP; streaming	Standard	BMG	
Various	14 July 2023	CD; digital download	Deluxe	BMG	

== See also ==
- List of UK Independent Albums Chart number ones of 2023
- List of UK top-ten albums in 2023
