= Taika Waititi filmography =

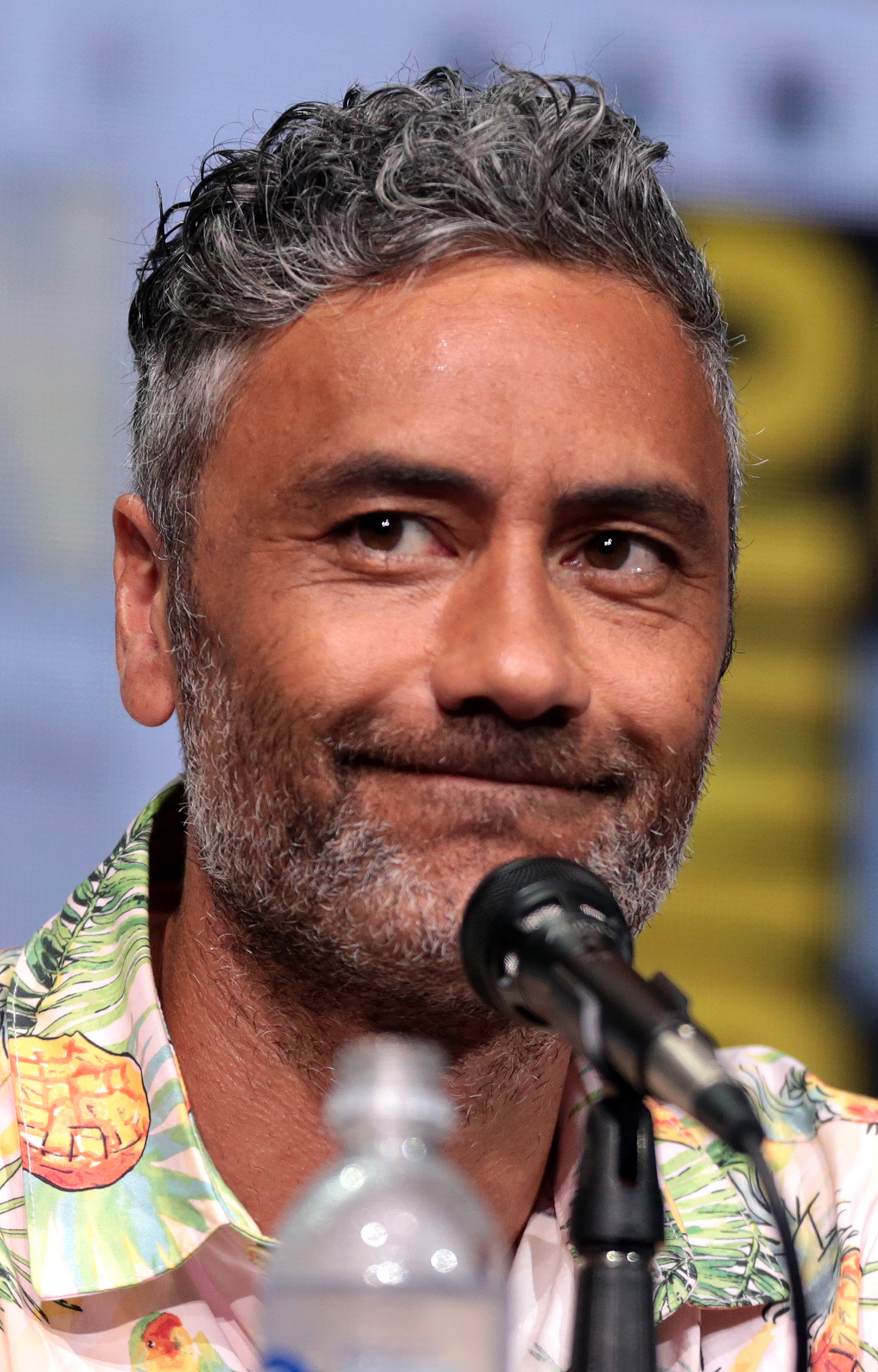
Taika Waititi at San Diego Comic-Con in 2017

Taika Waititi is a New Zealand filmmaker, actor, and comedian. Waititi began his film career in the early 2000s by directing short films. His short film Two Cars, One Night (2003) got him an Academy Award nomination for Best Live Action Short Film. His first feature film, Eagle vs Shark, was released in 2007. Waititi's second film, Boy (2010) premiered at the Sundance Film Festival and was nominated for the Grand Jury Prize.

He co-wrote and co-directed, and starred in the horror comedy film What We Do in the Shadows (2014) with Jemaine Clement, which was later adapted into a television series of the same name. In 2016, he wrote and directed the adventure comedy-drama film, Hunt for the Wilderpeople. The following year, he directed Marvel Studios's Thor: Ragnarok, and portrayed the alien Korg in the film. He wrote and directed the black comedy film, Jojo Rabbit (2019), in which he also starred in as an imaginary version of Adolf Hitler. Jojo Rabbit received six Academy Award nominations and won Best Adapted Screenplay. Waititi also earned a Grammy Award for producing the film's soundtrack.

In television, Waititi directed four episodes of the sitcom, Flight of the Conchords. He co-created and executive produced the dramedy series Reservation Dogs, and directed, executive produced, and starred in the comedy Our Flag Means Death. In addition to directing an episode of the series The Mandalorian in 2019, he also voiced the character IG-11, for which he was nominated for the Primetime Emmy Award for Outstanding Character Voice-Over Performance.

== Film ==
Year	Title	Director	Writer	Producer	Notes
2007	Eagle vs Shark	Yes	Yes	No	Including story
2010	Boy	Yes	Yes	No	
2014	What We Do in the Shadows	Yes	Yes	Yes	Co-wrote with Jemaine Clement
2016	Hunt for the Wilderpeople	Yes	Yes	Yes	
2017	Thor: Ragnarok	Yes	No	No	
2019	Jojo Rabbit	Yes	Yes	Yes	
2022	Thor: Love and Thunder	Yes	Yes	No	Co-wrote with Jennifer Kaytin Robinson
2023	Next Goal Wins	Yes	Yes	Yes	Co-wrote with Iain Morris
2026	Klara and the Sun	Yes	Yes	Yes	Co-wrote with Dahvi Waller

== Short film ==
Year	Title	Director	Writer	Producer
2002	John and Pogo	Yes	Yes	No
2003	Two Cars, One Night	Yes	Yes	No
2004	Heinous Crime	Yes	Yes	No
2005	Tama Tū	Yes	Yes	No
2005	What We Do in the Shadows: Interviews with Some Vampires	Yes	Yes	No
2013	The Captain	No	Yes	No
2014	Dating 101 with Viago	Yes	Yes	No
2014	Vampire's Guide to Vellington	Yes	Yes	No
2016	Team Thor	Yes	Yes	Yes
2017	Team Thor: Part 2	Yes	Yes	Yes
2018	Team Darryl	Yes	Yes	Yes
2024	The Boy & The Octopus	Yes	No	Yes
2025	Best Christmas Ever	Yes	No	No

== Television ==
Key
†	Denotes television productions that have not yet been released

Year	Title	Director	Writer	Executive Producer	Notes
2007–2009	Flight of the Conchords	Yes	Yes	No	4 episodes
2011	Super City	Yes	No	No	6 episodes
2012	The Inbetweeners (US version)	Yes	No	No	5 episodes
2018–2022	Wellington Paranormal	No	No	Yes	Co-creator
2019–2024	What We Do in the Shadows	Yes	Story	Yes	3 episodes
2019	The Mandalorian	Yes	No	No	Episode: "Chapter 8: Redemption"
2021–2023	Reservation Dogs	No	Yes	Yes	Co-creator
2022–2023	Our Flag Means Death	Yes	No	Yes	Episode: "Pilot"
2024	Time Bandits	Yes	Yes	Yes	Co-creator
2024	Interior Chinatown	Yes	No	Yes	Episode: "Generic Asian Man"
TBA	Very Young Frankenstein †	Yes	No	Yes	

== Acting appearances ==
=== Film ===
Year	Title	Role	Notes
1999	Scarfies	Alex	
2001	Snakeskin	Nelson	
2001	A New Way Home	Max	Short film
2004	Futile Attraction	Waiter	
2004	Heinous Crime	Various	Short film
2004	Toy Boy	Jack Hammer	Short film
2005	What We Do in the Shadows: Interviews with Some Vampires	Viago	Short film
2007	Eagle vs Shark	Gordon	
2010	Boy	Alamein	
2011	Green Lantern	Thomas Kalmaku	
2013	The Captain	The Captain	Short film
2013	Coffee Town	Cosmetology Instructor	Uncredited
2014	What We Do in the Shadows	Viago	
2016	Hunt for the Wilderpeople	Minister	
2017	Thor: Ragnarok	Korg Surtur (motion-capture)	
2018	Seven Stages to Achieve Eternal Bliss	Holy Storsh	
2018	Shrimp	Bartender	Short film
2019	Avengers: Endgame	Korg	
2019	Jojo Rabbit	Adolf Hitler	
2021	Save Ralph	Ralph (voice)	Short film
2021	Deadpool and Korg React	Korg	Promotional short film
2021	The Suicide Squad	Ratcatcher I	
2021	Free Guy	Antwan Hovachelik	
2021	The Electrical Life of Louis Wain	Max Kase	
2022	Lightyear	Mo Morrison	Voice role
2022	Thor: Love and Thunder	Korg Ninny the Nonnie	
2023	Next Goal Wins	American Samoan Priest	
2026	Fing!	The Viscount	
2026	Avatar Aang: The Last Airbender	Gorillavark	Voice role
2026	Place to Be	Nelson	
2027	Charlie Vs. The Chocolate Factory	Willy Wonka	Voice role; in production

=== Television ===
Year	Title	Role	Notes
2002	The Strip	Mostin	13 Episodes
2002	The Tribe	Virtual Reality; Cowboy No.1	Episode: "Episode #4.24" (uncredited)
2003	Revelations	Ali	Episode: "Mended Sole"
2003	Freaky	Cleaner	Episode: "Fridge, Cleaner & Sister"
2007	Flight of the Conchords	Gipsy Kings fan	Episode: "Drive By" (uncredited cameo)
2009	The Jaquie Brown Diaries	Friendly Gypsy	Episode: "Brownward Spiral"
2010	Radiradirah	Various	8 episodes
2019	What We Do in the Shadows	Viago	3 episodes
2019–2023	The Mandalorian	IG-11	Voice; 5 episodes
2019–2023	The Mandalorian	IG-12 (Grogu)	Voice; 2 episodes
2019	Year of the Rabbit	Merrick's Performer	Cameo
2019	Rick and Morty	Glootie	Voice; episode: "The Old Man and the Seat"
2020	Home Movie: The Princess Bride	Westley / The Man in Black	Episode: "Chapter Nine: Have Fun Storming the Castle!"
2021	RuPaul's Drag Race Down Under	Guest star	1 episode
2021-2024	What If...?	Korg	Voice; 4 episodes: "What If... Thor Were an Only Child?", "What If... Nebula Joined the Nova Corps?", "What If... Iron Man Crashed Into the Grandmaster?"", "What If... the Watcher Disappeared?"
2022-2023	Our Flag Means Death	Edward "Blackbeard" Teach	Main role
2023	History of the World, Part II	Sigmund Freud	1 episode
2023	The Simpsons	Himself	Voice; episode: "Murder She Boat"
2024	Time Bandits	Supreme Being	Main role
2025	The Masked Singer	Himself/Detective Lucky Duck	Season 13; 8 episodes
2025	Conan O'Brien Must Go	Himself	Season 2, Episode 2 ("New Zealand")
2025	It's Florida, Man	Doctor Orlando	Episode: "Crushed"

== Uncredited work ==
Year	Title	Role
2016	Doctor Strange	Directed mid-credit sequence
2016	Moana	Wrote the initial screenplay

== Music videos ==
- "Ladies of the World", Flight of the Conchords (2007)
- "Mutha'uckas", Flight of the Conchords (2007)
- "Leggy Blonde", Flight of the Conchords (2007)
- "Shanks' Pony", Age Pryor (2007)
- "Bright Grey", The Phoenix Foundation (2007)
- "My Imminent Demise", Luke Buda (2008)
- "40 Years", The Phoenix Foundation (2009)
- "World Gone Sour (The Lost Kids)", Method Man (2011)
- "My Sweet Lord", George Harrison (2021)
- "Praising You", Rita Ora (2023)
- "Don't Think Twice", Rita Ora (2023)
- "Ask & You Shall Receive", Rita Ora (2024)
- "Heat", Rita Ora (2025; cameo)
- "All Natural", Rita Ora (2025; director)

== Other ==
Year	Title	Director	Notes
2026	Save Your Life. Rinse Repeat (campaign film for Breast CancerFoundation NZ)	Yes	Production designer: Ra Vincent Actor: Xavier Garneau-Roughan

== Commercials ==
Waititi has also been a prolific commercial director. He directed Air New Zealand's "The Most Epic Safety Video Ever Made" featuring Peter Jackson and Elijah Wood as they go through where The Lord of the Rings films were shot. In 2013, Waititi directed Tesco's "Borg," which features a comical Thor-esque character shopping in the supermarket; and he went on to direct Marvel Studios' Thor: Ragnarok a few years later.

- "Friends Reunited", Friends Reunited (2008)
- "Moussaka Rap", Pot Noodle (2008)
- "I Wish (That Girls Were More Like Pot Noodles)", Pot Noodle (2008)
- "Back with no Appetite", Pot Noodle (2008)
- "World Gone Sour (The Lost Kids)", Sour Patch Kids (2011)
- "Simply The Best", Cadbury Dairy Milk (2011)
- "Gold", Wispa (2011)
- "Superbowl Brotherhood of Man", NBC (2012)
- "Pure", Steinlager (2012)
- "New Girl", Old Navy (2012)
- "Why Choose?", Old Navy (2012)
- "Bee Bots!", Old Navy (2012)
- "Australia Day", Lambnesia (2013)
- "State of the -Ation", Samsung (2013)
- "MIDWULS", Optimum Cable (2013)
- "Borg" Tesco (2013)
- "Pierce Brosnan", Sky Ireland (2013)
- "Blazed", New Zealand Transport Agency (2013)
- "#HELLOBEER", Carlton (2013)
- "The Kids Party", Nimble (2014)
- "The Gas Bill", Nimble (2014)
- "The Phone Bill", Nimble (2014)
- "Laura", Stop Before You Start (2014)
- "Toa", Stop Before You Start (2014)
- "Tori", Stop Before You Start (2014)
- "Jackson", Stop Before You Start (2014)
- "Destiny", Stop Before You Start (2014)
- "The Most Epic Safety Video Ever", Air New Zealand (2014)
- "Watch It Over and Over", Nova Energy (2014)
- "Tinnyvision", New Zealand Transport Agency (2014)
- "Choose Your Trebor - Confessions", Trebor Mints (2015)
- "Broadband Made Simple", 2degrees (2015)
- "Gorgeous Greta", Crazy Domains (2015)
- "Kev of All Trades", Crazy Domains (2015)
- "Stuff Your Loved Ones", Crazy Domains (2015)
- "Taika's Appeal", New Zealand Human Rights Commission (2017)
- "Locker room", DirecTV (2018)
- "Talk to the Land", Old Spice (2018)
- "Stay Cool", Old Spice (2018)
- "She Nose Best", Old Spice (2018)
- "No Can Left Behind", Pepsi Max (2019)
- "Coca-Cola Christmas Commercial", Coca-Cola (2020)
- "Xbox Series X – Lucid Odyssey", Xbox (2020)
- "Seize the Night & Day", Idorsia (2022)
- "Belvedere Presents Daniel Craig", Belvedere Vodka (2022)
- "Joy Is Made", Amazon (2022)
- "Make this Christmas Incredibublé", ASDA (2023)
- "The Lost Voice", Apple (2023)
- "Kiss from a Lime", Mountain Dew, featuring Seal and Becky G (Super Bowl, 2025)
- "Belvedere Presents Future", Belvedere Vodka (2024)
- "Don't Overthink It, Give Something Beautiful", Sephora campaign (launched 30 October 2024)
- "The Little Farmer", Lay's (Super Bowl, 2025)
- "Not Saying We're the Best" and "Still Not Saying We’re the Best", Homes.com (Super Bowl, 2025)
- "The Choice", Pepsi (Super Bowl, 2026)
- "Jurassic Park... Works", Xfinity (Super Bowl, 2026)
- "Last Harvest", Lay's (Super Bowl, 2026)
- "Taika Waititi Sends Reese Witherspoon on Parisian Adventure in Wells Fargo Ad", Wells Fargo and BBDO New York
