= Chris Bliss =

American juggler

- Born: Chris Bliss; Washington, D.C.
- Education: Northwestern University; University of Oregon
- Occupations: Comedian, juggler

Chris Bliss is an American stand up comedian and juggler, perhaps best known for a viral video of him juggling to Beatles songs.

== Early career ==
Bliss grew up in Washington, D.C. He went on to major in comparative literature at Northwestern University and the University of Oregon before dropping out to pursue a career in juggling. He decided not to pursue the conventional route of circus style juggling. Instead he chose to blend popular music with tightly choreographed fast-paced moves. While numbers jugglers seek to juggle more and more objects, Bliss chose to juggle only three balls. It is this combination of a simple juggling style and his choice of popular music that made Bliss a big hit, culminating in him being chosen as the sole opening act for The Jacksons on their 1984 Victory Tour.

Following on from this success, Bliss expanded his juggling act to include stand-up comedy. His act now comprises both stand-up elements and juggling.

== Viral video ==
In 2006 Bliss enjoyed widespread fame when an online video of his juggling finale became a viral internet sensation. The five-minute video shows his energetic finale where he juggles 3 balls to Golden Slumbers/Carry That Weight/The End by The Beatles. The video was widely circulated via email and blogs with an estimated 20 million viewings within the first 40 days alone. Total views to date are estimate to be over 80 million. The video caused quite a stir in the juggling world, with Bliss appearing as a guest on Penn Jillette's radio show, Penn was himself a juggler and is associated with the World Juggling Federation.

Following the success of his "Grand Finale" video, the UK musician Fatboy Slim ran an online competition on MySpace asking for fans to submit juggling videos for the single release That Old Pair of Jeans. The competition asked whether you can "Juggle to music like Chris Bliss" and featured a video of Bliss juggling three balls in his unique style to the single. John Augustus "Gus" Tate was announced the competition's winner on Fatboy Slim's MySpace on August 2, 2006.

== MyBillofRights.org ==
Aside from his performance career, Bliss has also started the nonprofit MyBillofRights.org, granted 501(c) 3 status in 2006. The goal of the project is to create monuments and other public displays of the United States Bill of Rights in civic spaces across America. Their first display was dedicated in Montezuma, Iowa on July 5, 2008. A monument at the Arizona State Capitol in Phoenix has been approved and is in the final stages of design development. The Bill of Rights Plaza design, for the Texas State Capitol in Austin, has also been approved for fundraising. The organization is funded by individual contributions, and has also been supported by the Newman's Own Foundation.
