= Champion Sound (song) =

Single by Fatboy Slim featuring Lateef the Truth Speaker

from the album The Greatest Hits – Why Try Harder
- Released: 6 November 2006
- Length: 3:01
- Label: Skint
- Songwriter: Fatboy Slim
- Producer: Fatboy Slim

Fatboy Slim singles chronology
"Weapon of Choice (Remix)" (2006)	"Champion Sound" (2006)	"Radioactivity" (2007)

Lateef the Truth Speaker singles chronology
"Enuff" (2006)	"Champion Sound" (2006)

"Champion Sound" is a song by English big beat musician Fatboy Slim from his compilation album The Greatest Hits - Why Try Harder. It features Lateef the Truth Speaker on the vocal track. An alternate version featured on the US version of The Greatest Hits – Why Try Harder features both Lateef the Truth Speaker and Sharon Woolf. It is known for its music video, which features objects falling in a sequence like dominoes. The single peaked at number 88 on the UK Singles Chart.

== Music video ==
The music video for the song shows various objects toppling down like dominoes as the sequence moves across an apartment resided by two girls. The video ends with a cameo appearance by Norman Cook (Fatboy Slim). In the first part of the video, various Fatboy Slim CDs are seen being used as dominoes, including the UK release of The Greatest Hits – Why Try Harder.

== Track listing ==
CD1
No.	Title	Length
1.	"Champion Sound" (Fatboy Slim remix)	5:56
2.	"The Rockafeller Skank" (The Automatic remix)	2:39

CD2
No.	Title	Length
1.	"Champion Sound" (radio edit)	2:43
2.	"Champion Sound" (Switch mix)	5:53
3.	"Champion Sound" (Krafty Kuts mix)	6:25
4.	"Champion Sound" (M Factor remix)	7:28
5.	"Champion Sound" (Digital Dog remix)	6:17
6.	"Champion Sound" (a cappella)	2:19

12" vinyl
No.	Title	Length
1.	"Champion Sound" (Switch remix)	5:53
2.	"Champion Sound" (Krafty Kuts remix)	6:25
3.	"Champion Sound" (M Factor remix)	7:28
4.	"Champion Sound" (Fatboy Slim remix)	5:56

== Charts ==
Chart performance for "Champion Sound"
Chart (2006)	Peak Position
UK Singles (Official Charts)	88
