= Praising You =

2023 single by Rita Ora

Single by Rita Ora featuring Fatboy Slim

from the album You & I
- Released: 19 April 2023
- Genre: House
- Length: 2:45
- Label: BMG
- Songwriters: Rita Ora; Norman Cook; Camille Yarbrough; Georgia Ku; Karen Poole; Jon Shave; Serban Cazan
- Producers: Jon Shave; Oak Felder; Serban Cazan

Rita Ora singles chronology
"You Only Love Me" (2023)	"Praising You" (2023)	"Don't Think Twice" (2023)

Fatboy Slim singles chronology
"All the Ladies" (2020)	"Praising You" (2023)	"Role Model" (2024)

Music video
- "Praising You" on YouTube

"Praising You" is a song by British singer Rita Ora featuring English musician and DJ Fatboy Slim. The song was released on 19 April 2023 through BMG, as the second single from Ora's third studio album You & I (2023). The song is a re-worked version of Slim's song "Praise You", which itself a sample of Camille Yarbrough's song "Take Yo' Praise".

== Critical reception ==
Emma Harrison of Clash complimented, "Rita’s re-imagining of nineties banger ‘Praise You’ by Fatboy Slim. She’s ebullient, dynamic and triumphant on the gospel-infused house of number, reflecting on how it’s been “a hell of a ride”, reiterating her gratitude for finding enduring love with the lyrics “who knew love would leave me feelin’ this good? / I have to praise you like I should”. Lauren Murphy of the Irish Times called Praising You, "a somewhat baffling reworking of Fatboy Slim’s biggest hit, with input from Norman Cook himself."

Helen Brown of The Independent exclaimed, "It’s a slick evolution of Norman Cook’s original, on which Ora sounds genuinely jubilant – arms aloft and giddy for it." Kate Solomon of The i Paper dismissively noted, "a slick, empty rework of Fatboy Slim’s “Praise You”.

Hannah Mylrea of Rolling Stone UK hailed the tune saying, "the weirdly wonderful reworking of Fatboy Slim’s iconic ‘Praise You’, titled ‘Praising You’, may not trump the original, but is wickedly good fun." Neil Z. Yeung of Allmusic also found, "album highlight "Praising You,"...interpolates Fatboy Slim's "Praise You" to the intended joyous effect."

== Live performances ==
Ora performed "Praising You" as a part of a medley of her songs in the first semi-final of the Eurovision Song Contest 2023 on 9 May.

== Use in media ==
In August 2023, the song was featured in advertisements for BMW. It was also featured at the end of the 2023 animated teen comedy film Ruby Gillman, Teenage Kraken which feature additional orchestrations by Stephanie Economou.

== Music video ==
The music video for "Praising You" was published on YouTube on 28 April 2023. Directed by Ora's husband Taika Waititi, the music video was shot on film and pays homage to Spike Jonze-directed video for "Praise You", and references the musical films, Fame and All That Jazz. The video was nominated for Best Music Video award at 2023 Camerimage.

A second music video, directed by Joseph Kahn, was released on YouTube on 19 May 2023.

== Track listings ==
- Digital download
1. "Praising You" – 2:45
- Digital download [Dopamine Remix]
1. "Praising You" [Dopamine Remix] – 2:19
- Digital download [Fatboy Slim Remix]
1. "Praising You" [Fatboy Slim Remix] – 4:20
- Digital download [Jodie Harsh Remix]
1. "Praising You" [Jodie Harsh Remix] – 2:31

== Charts ==
=== Weekly charts ===
Weekly chart performance for "Praising You"
Chart (2023)	Peak position
Belarus Airplay (TopHit)	16
Canada CHR/Top 40 (Billboard)	33
CIS Airplay (TopHit)	12
Croatia International Airplay (HRT)	5
Czech Republic Airplay (ČNS IFPI)	55
Estonia Airplay (TopHit)	11
Hungary (Rádiós Top 40)	31
Italy Independent (Radiomonitor)	1
Kazakhstan Airplay (TopHit)	18
Latvia Airplay (LAIPA)	8
Latvia Airplay (TopHit) Fatboy Slim Remix	15
Lebanon (Lebanese Top 20)	7
Lithuania Airplay (TopHit)	5
Moldova Airplay (TopHit)	147
New Zealand Hot Singles (RMNZ)	15
Poland (Polish Airplay Top 100)	20
Romania Airplay (TopHit)	39
Russia Airplay (TopHit)	12
San Marino (SMRRTV Top 50)	18
Slovakia Airplay (ČNS IFPI)	53
UK Singles Downloads (Official Charts)	13
US Adult Pop Airplay (Billboard)	36
US Hot Dance/Electronic Songs (Billboard)	13
US Dance Airplay (Billboard)	1
US Pop Airplay (Billboard)	23

=== Monthly charts ===
Monthly chart performance for "Praising You"
Chart (2023)	Peak position
Belarus Airplay (TopHit)	24
CIS Airplay (TopHit)	21
Czech Republic (Rádio – Top 100)	65
Estonia Airplay (TopHit)	13
Kazakhstan Airplay (TopHit)	38
Latvia Airplay (TopHit)	31
Latvia Airplay (TopHit) Fatboy Slim Remix	20
Lithuania Airplay (TopHit)	5
Romania Airplay (TopHit)	46
Russia Airplay (TopHit)	24
Slovakia (Rádio – Top 100)	66

=== Year-end charts ===
Year-end chart performance for "Praising You"
Chart (2023)	Position
Belarus Airplay (TopHit)	77
CIS Airplay (TopHit)	100
Estonia Airplay (TopHit)	85
Latvia Airplay (TopHit)	183
Latvia Airplay (TopHit) Fatboy Slim Remix	131
Lithuania Airplay (TopHit)	22
Romania Airplay (TopHit)	120
Russia Airplay (TopHit)	145
US Hot Dance/Electronic Songs (Billboard)	39

== Release history ==
Release dates and formats for "Praising You"
Region	Date	Format(s)	Label	Ref.
Italy	3 March 2023	Radio airplay	BMG	

== See also ==
- List of Billboard number-one dance songs of 2023
