= You Only Love Me =

2023 single by Rita Ora

Single by Rita Ora

from the album You & I
- Released: 27 January 2023
- Genre: Club; dance; electropop
- Length: 2:28
- Label: BMG
- Songwriters: Rita Ora; Corey Sanders; Elle Campbell; Jon Maguire; Lewis Thompson; Phoebe Jasper; Rory Adams
- Producers: Lewis Thompson; Oak Felder

Rita Ora singles chronology
"Follow Me" (2021)	"You Only Love Me" (2023)	"Praising You" (2023)

Music video
- "You Only Love Me" on YouTube

"You Only Love Me" is a song by British singer Rita Ora, released on 27 January 2023 as the lead single from her third studio album, You & I (2023).

== Background and composition ==
"You Only Love Me" was released on 27 January 2023 through BMG, as the lead single from Ora's third studio album, You & I. The song was written by Ora alongside Corey Sanders, Elle Campbell, Jon Maguire, Lewis Thompson, Phoebe Jasper and Rory Adams, and produced by Thompson and Oak Felder. Concerning its meaning, Ora elaborated, "With [the song] and my upcoming album, I wanted to capture the vulnerability I've experienced as I opened myself up to love and entered a new phase of life." Musically, "You Only Love Me" is a club, dance and electropop song.

== Live performances ==
Ora performed "You Only Love Me" for the first time on the ninth season of the American talk show The Tonight Show Starring Jimmy Fallon on 1 February 2023.

== Music video ==
The music video for "You Only Love Me" was uploaded to Ora's official YouTube channel on 27 January 2023. Sharon Stone, Lindsay Lohan, Kristen Stewart, Jodie Turner-Smith, Addison Rae and Chelsea Handler make cameo appearances in the video.

== Charts ==
=== Weekly charts ===
Weekly chart performance for "You Only Love Me"
Chart (2023)	Peak position
Belarus Airplay (TopHit)	105
Belgium (Ultratop 50 Flanders)	50
CIS Airplay (TopHit)	146
Croatia International Airplay (Top lista)	38
Germany (Airplay Chart)	3
Ireland (IRMA)	42
Latvia Airplay (TopHit)	15
Lithuania Airplay (TopHit)	3
Netherlands (Single Tip)	1
New Zealand Hot Singles (RMNZ)	3
Poland (Polish Airplay Top 100)	80
Slovakia Airplay (ČNS IFPI)	11
Sweden Heatseeker (Sverigetopplistan)	6
UK Singles (Official Charts)	57
UK Indie (Official Charts)	14

=== Monthly charts ===
Monthly chart performance for "Praising You"
Chart (2023)	Peak position
Latvia Airplay (TopHit)	53
Lithuania Airplay (TopHit)	3
Slovakia (Rádio – Top 100)	17

=== Year-end charts ===
Year-end chart performance for "You Only Love Me"
Chart (2023)	Position
Latvia Airplay (TopHit)	66
Lithuania Airplay (TopHit)	26

== Release history ==
Release dates and formats for "You Only Love Me"
Region	Date	Format(s)	Label	Ref.
Various	27 January 2023	Digital download; streaming	BMG	
United Kingdom	27 January 2023	Various	BMG	
United States	14 February 2023	Contemporary hit radio	BMG	
Italy	3 March 2023	Radio airplay	BMG	
