= Better Living Through Chemistry (album) =

Studio album by Fatboy Slim
- Released: 16 September 1996
- Recorded: The House of Love (Brighton, England)
- Genre: Big beat
- Length: 57:47 (UK version); 70:52 (US version)
- Labels: Skint; Astralwerks
- Producer: Fatboy Slim

Fatboy Slim chronology
Better Living Through Chemistry (1996)	You've Come a Long Way, Baby (1998)

Singles from Better Living Through Chemistry
- 1. "Everybody Needs a 303" Released: 26 February 1996; 2. "Punk to Funk" Released: August 1996; 3. "Going Out of My Head" Released: 21 April 1997

Better Living Through Chemistry is the debut studio album by English electronic music producer Fatboy Slim. It was released on 16 September 1996 in the United Kingdom by Skint Records and in the United States by Astralwerks. It was Fatboy Slim's first work to chart outside of the UK, with the single "Going Out of My Head" notably charting in the US, and was certified gold by the BPI.

== Background ==
Skint Records founder Damian Harris has described the album as having been "more of a compilation than an album", as some of the tracks had been recorded some time before its release, due to Norman Cook's other musical projects. Three songs from the album were previously released in Skint's first volume of their Brassic Beats compilation album series, which is advertised in the album's booklet.

The album's cover features an image of a 3.5-inch floppy disk, paying homage to the cover of New Order's "Blue Monday" single, which featured a 5.25-inch disk. The album's title is a variation of a DuPont advertising slogan, "Better Things for Better Living...Through Chemistry", and Norman Cook said it was also inspired by the heavy influence he took from The Chemical Brothers, whose DJ sets he had attended.

== Critical reception ==
Professional ratings
Review scores
Source	Rating
AllMusic	4/5 stars
Christgau's Consumer Guide	(2-star Honorable Mention)
Muzik	4/5 stars
Pitchfork	6.8/10
Rolling Stone	3/5 stars
Tom Hull – on the Web	A−

The album received generally positive reviews from critics. A 1997 review from Rolling Stone claimed the album to be "one of the most fun, shamelessly genre-hopping dance albums of the year". The Philadelphia Inquirer called the album "the first to open the drums 'n' bass world to naturally occurring rhythm patterns... The terrific Better Living Through Chemistry offers a parade of block-rockin' beats not born in a test tube." AllMusic rated it four stars out of five, recommending the album to "those who can't get enough of the popular technoid-sampled alternative dance style of the late '90s".

== Legacy ==
The album was included in the book 1001 Albums You Must Hear Before You Die.

== In popular culture ==
The song "Give the Po' Man a Break" is featured in the 2000 film Traffic. The song "The Weekend Starts Here" is featured in the first episode of the British sitcom Spaced.

== Track listing ==
All tracks are written by Norman Cook, except where noted.

No.	Title	Writer(s)	Length
1.	"Song for Lindy"		4:50
2.	"Santa Cruz"		7:30
3.	"Going Out of My Head"	Cook; Pete Townshend	5:14
4.	"The Weekend Starts Here"	Cook; Idris Muhammad; Grover Washington Jr.	6:41
5.	"Everybody Needs a 303"	Cook; Edwin Starr	5:49
6.	"Give the Po' Man a Break"		5:50
7.	"10th & Crenshaw"		4:20
8.	"First Down"		6:18
9.	"Punk to Funk"	Cook; Keith Mansfield	4:57
10.	"The Sound of Milwaukee"		6:18

US Astralwerks release bonus tracks
No.	Title	Length
11.	"Michael Jackson"	5:49
12.	"Next to Nothing"	7:16

Japanese edition bonus track
No.	Title	Length
11.	"Es Paradis"	5:44

Vinyl edition bonus track
No.	Title	Length
11.	"Crenshaw Siren Beats" (reprise of "10th & Crenshaw")	2:50

20th anniversary edition disc 2
No.	Title	Writer(s)	Length
1.	"Michael Jackson"		5:49
2.	"Next to Nothing"		7:16
3.	"Everybody Loves a Carnival"	Cook; Starr	4:04
4.	"Es Paradis"		5:43
5.	"First Down the Disco"		5:49
6.	"Sunset 303"		10:04
7.	"Neal Cassady Starts Here"		5:20
8.	"It's a Dream"		6:16
9.	"Knuf ot Knup"		5:26
10.	"Big Beat Souffle"		4:44
11.	"Everybody Loves a Filter"	Cook; Starr	6:22
12.	"Weekend Bonus Beats"		3:27
13.	"Crenshaw Siren Beats"		3:00

== Charts ==
Chart (1996–99)	Peak position
New Zealand Albums (RMNZ)	50
Scottish Albums (Official Charts)	88
UK Albums (Official Charts)	69
UK Independent Albums (Official Charts)	9

== Certifications ==
Region	Certification	Certified units/sales
United Kingdom (BPI)	Gold	100,000^{^}
^{^} Shipments figures based on certification alone.
