= Follow Me (Sam Feldt and Rita Ora song) =

Single by Sam Feldt and Rita Ora
- Released: 10 December 2021
- Genre: Dance-pop
- Length: 2:49
- Label: Palm Tree; Good Soldier
- Songwriter(s): Ella Henderson; Ollie Green; Dominic Lyttle; Mike Needle; Rita Ora; Sam Renders
- Producer(s): Sam Feldt; Dominic Lyttle

Sam Feldt singles chronology
"Call on Me" (2021)	"Follow Me" (2021)

Rita Ora singles chronology
"You for Me" (2021)	"Follow Me" (2021)	"You Only Love Me" (2023)

Music video
- "Follow Me" on YouTube

"Follow Me" is a song by Dutch DJ Sam Feldt and British singer Rita Ora, released on 10 December 2021 via Palm Tree Records and Good Soldier Songs. The song was written by Ella Henderson, Ollie Green, Dominic Lyttle, Mike Needle, Rita Ora and Sam Feldt, and produced by Feldt and Lyttle.

== Music video ==
The music video was released on 17 December 2021 and directed by Johannes Lovund. It was shot in the California desert, and depicts the life of a young couple who work on a farm and are trying to save enough money to leave.

== Credits and personnel ==
Credits adapted from Tidal.

- Dominic Lyttle – producer, composer
- Sam Feldt – producer, composer, lyricist, associated performer
- Ella Henderson – composer
- Mike Needle – composer
- Ollie Green – composer, drum programmer
- Rita Ora – composer, associated performer, vocal
- Jordan Schultz – mixing engineer
- Trevor Muzzy – recording engineer
- Cameron Gower Poole – vocal producer

== Charts ==
=== Weekly charts ===
Weekly chart performance for "Follow Me"
Chart (2021–2022)	Peak position
Czech Republic (Rádio – Top 100)	58
Netherlands (Dutch Top 40)	28
Netherlands (Single Top 100)	66
New Zealand Hot Singles (RMNZ)	16
Slovakia (Rádio Top 100)	77
US Hot Dance/Electronic Songs (Billboard)	15

=== Year-end charts ===
Year-end chart performance for "Follow Me"
Chart (2022)	Position
US Hot Dance/Electronic Songs (Billboard)	65

== Release history ==
Release history for "Follow Me"
Region	Date	Format	Label	Ref.
Various	10 December 2021	Digital download; streaming	Palm Tree; Good Soldier Songs	
Italy	7 January 2022	Contemporary hit radio	Sony	
