= Everybody Needs a 303 =

Single by Fatboy Slim

from the album Better Living Through Chemistry
- Released: 26 February 1996 ("CD1"); 20 October 1997 ("CD2")
- Length: 5:49
- Label: Skint
- Songwriter: Fatboy Slim
- Producer: Fatboy Slim

Fatboy Slim singles chronology
| "Everybody Needs a 303" (00000005) | "Punk to Funk" (1996) |

Fatboy Slim remix singles chronology
| "Going Out of My Head" (1997) | "Everybody Needs a 303 (Remix – Everybody Loves a Carnival)" (1997) | "The Rockafeller Skank" (1998) |

Alternative cover
- Cover for the song's CD2.

"Everybody Needs a 303" is the debut single by British big beat artist Fatboy Slim, released in 1996 from his debut album Better Living Through Chemistry. The original version of the single peaked at number 191 on the UK Singles Chart. The song was remixed as "Everybody Loves a Carnival" and released as a single; this version became more commercially successful than its original version, peaking at number 34 on the UK Singles Chart.

== Song information ==
The title refers to the TB-303 synthesizer. The song samples Edwin Starr's "Everybody Needs Love". It was featured on the Lost in Space soundtrack.

== Track listing ==
CD1

1. "Everybody Needs a 303" (Original Radio Edit)
2. "Everybody Needs a 303"
3. "Everybody Loves a Carnival"
4. "Neal Cassady Starts Here"

CD2

1. "Everybody Loves a Carnival" (Radio Edit)
2. "Everybody Loves a Filter"
3. "Es Paradis"
4. "Where You're At"

12"

1. "Everybody Needs a 303"
2. "Lincoln Memorial"
3. "We Want to See Those Fingers"

== Charts ==
| Chart (1996) | Peak position |
|---|---|
| UK Singles Chart | 191 |
| Chart (1997) | Peak position |
| UK Singles Chart: "Everybody Loves a Carnival" | 34 |
| Chart (2002) | Peak position |
| UK Singles Chart: "Everybody Loves a Carnival" | 199 |
