= Mickey Mouse Disco =

1979 album

Studio album by Mickey Mouse
- Released: July 1979
- Genre: Disco
- Length: 29:29
- Label: Disneyland

Professional ratings
Review scores
Source	Rating
AllMusic	2.5/5 stars

Mickey Mouse Disco is an album released by Disneyland Records in 1979. A late entry in the genre of disco, Mickey Mouse Disco included disco versions of Disney songs and Disney-fied versions of disco hits. The album was re-released on CD in 1995, and later as a download. On April 13, 2019, in honor of the album's 40th anniversary, the original LP was reissued for the annual Record Store Day.

== Chart performance ==
The album peaked at number 35 on Billboard's Pop Albums Chart and was certified 2× Platinum by the RIAA.

== Track listing ==
=== Arrangement ===
Arrangement is done by Dennis Burnside (except "It's a Small World").

=== Side one ===
1. "Disco Mickey Mouse" – 4:00
2. "Welcome to Rio" – 3:23
3. "The Greatest Band" – 4:10
4. "Zip-a-Dee-Doo-Dah" – 2:13

=== Side two ===
1. "Macho Duck" – 4:36
2. "Mousetrap" – 2:56
3. "Watch Out for Goofy!" – 3:30
4. "It's a Small World" – 2:28
5. "Chim Chim Cher-ee" – 2:10

== Personnel ==
- Tom Worrall – writer (tracks 1, 5)
- Dennis Burnside – arrangements (tracks 1–7, 9), keyboards (track 6)
- George Charouhas - writer (tracks 2, 7)
- Steven Bruce Furman – writer (tracks 2, 7)
- Pat Patrick – writer (track 3)
- Allie Wrubel – writer (track 4)
- Ray Gilbert – writer (track 4)
- Eddie Frierson – lead vocals (track 5)
- Jim Tadevic – voice of Donald Duck
- Tony Pope – voice of Goofy
- Jymn Magon – writer (track 6), producer
- Rick Daller – trumpet (track 6)
- Don Jackson – saxophone (track 6)
- Terry Mead – trumpet (track 6)
- Rex Peer – trombone (track 6)
- Richard M. Sherman – writer (tracks 8–9)
- Robert B. Sherman – writer (tracks 8–9)
- Dick Duerrstein – art direction
- Alvin S. White Studio – cover illustration

== Certifications ==
Region	Certification	Certified units/sales
Australia (ARIA)	Gold	20,000^{^}
Canada (Music Canada)	2× Platinum	200,000^{^}
United States (RIAA)	2× Platinum	2,000,000^{^}
^{^} Shipments figures based on certification alone.

== Film ==
Mickey Mouse Disco
- Directed by: Riley Thomson; Dave Hand; Charles Nichols; Jack King; Ben Sharpsteen; Jack Kinney; Norman Ferguson
- Produced by: Ron Miller; Walt Disney (archival footage, uncredited)
- Production companies: Walt Disney Productions; Disneyland Records
- Distributed by: Buena Vista Distribution
- Release date: June 25, 1980; (Theatrical release with The Last Flight of Noah's Ark)
- Running time: 7 minutes

A short film based on the album, a music video clip show of classic Disney cartoons comprising five of the nine songs featured was released theatrically on June 25, 1980, alongside the feature The Last Flight of Noah's Ark.

The clips featured in the short were Thru the Mirror (1936), Clock Cleaners (1937), Mr. Duck Steps Out (1940), Mickey's Birthday Party and Symphony Hour (both 1942), the first appearance of Panchito Pistoles from The Three Caballeros (1944), Mickey's Delayed Date (1947) and How to Dance (1953). It was also included in episodes of various Disney cartoon compilation shows, such as Mickey's Mouse Tracks, The Ink & Paint Club and Donald's Quack Attack.

== Legacy ==
"Disco Mickey Mouse" has appeared on more Disney compilation albums like Hallmark Celebrates 75 Years With Mickey and Walt Disney Records Archive Collection, Vol.1

D23 celebrated the album's 40th anniversary with a roller disco party.

A sample of the discofied version of "It's a Small World" can be heard on Fatboy Slim's 1999 recording "Praise You".

The outfit that Mickey wears on the cover of the album is on display as one of his costumes in the queue of the Mickey & Minnie's Runaway Railway attraction at Disneyland. In addition, a selection of songs from the album can be heard from sound equipment next to the costume.

== See also ==
- Disco Duck
- "Macho Man" (song)
- Walt Disney Records
- Disco music
