= Dust Junkys =

- Origin: Manchester, England
- Genre: Rap rock
- Years active: 1995–2000; 2015–present
- Label: Polydor
- Members: Nicky Lockett; Sam Brox; Steve Ojay; Mykey Wilson
- Past members: Ganiyu Pierre Gasper

The Dust Junkys are an English rap rock group, formed in Manchester and originally active between 1995 and 2000, before reforming in 2015.

Following the stalling of his solo career, Nicky Lockett formed the Dust Junkys in 1995, with Sam Brox on guitar, Stephen "OJ" Oliver Jones on bass guitar, Mykey Wilson on drums and Ganiyu Pierre Gasper on turntables. The band concentrated on gigging in the Manchester area and then national tours, building audiences for their mix of British hip hop and rock music.

The Dust Junkys were signed to Polydor and released their first single "Living in the Pocket of a Drug Queen?" (1997), followed by "(Nonstopoperation)", an NME single of the week, and "What Time Is It?" which reached number 39 in the UK chart. The Dust Junkys music was subject to remixes by artists such as Fun Loving Criminals. The track "Fever" was featured on the soundtrack for the Sony PlayStation game, Driver 2.

The most widely recognized piece of Dust Junkys music, originally called "Rinse (Beatbox Wash)", released as the B-side of "Living in the Pocket of a Drug Queen?", came to prominence as the main hook of Fatboy Slim's "Gangster Trippin'". The track peaked at number 3 in the UK Singles Chart. "Gangster Trippin'" was also featured on the Fatboy Slim album You've Come a Long Way, Baby, where 25% of the songwriting credits were attributed to Dust Junkys and MC Tunes.

== Discography ==
=== Albums ===
- Done and ...Dusted (Polydor, 1998)
- Done and ...Dusted Special Edition/Dub and ...Dusted (Polydor, 1998)
- Reboot: Redone and Dusted (WikiBeats, 2018)

=== Singles ===
- "Living in the Pocket of a Drug Queen?" (Polydor, 1997)
- "(Nonstopoperation)" (Polydor, 1997) UK#47
- "What Time is It?" (Polydor, 1998) UK#39
- "Nothin' Personal" (Polydor, 1998) Chart No. 62
