= You've Come a Long Way, Baby =

Studio album by Fatboy Slim
- Released: 19 October 1998
- Studios: The House of Love (Brighton, England)
- Genres: Big beat; techno
- Length: 62:00
- Labels: Skint; Astralwerks
- Producer: Norman Cook

Fatboy Slim chronology
Better Living Through Chemistry (1996)	You've Come a Long Way, Baby (1998)	Halfway Between the Gutter and the Stars (2000)

North American cover

Singles from You've Come a Long Way, Baby
- 1. "The Rockafeller Skank" Released: 8 June 1998; 2. "Gangster Tripping" Released: 5 October 1998; 3. "Praise You" Released: 4 January 1999; 4. "Right Here, Right Now" Released: 19 April 1999

You've Come a Long Way, Baby is the second studio album by English electronic music producer Fatboy Slim (Norman Cook). It was first released on 19 October 1998 in the United Kingdom by Skint Records and a day later in the United States by Astralwerks. You've Come a Long Way, Baby proved to be Cook's global breakthrough album, peaking at number one on the UK Albums Chart and number 34 on the US Billboard 200. Praised by critics for its sound and style, the album brought international attention to Cook, earning him a Brit Award in 1999, and was later certified four times platinum by the BPI and platinum by the RIAA. Four singles were released from the album: "The Rockafeller Skank", "Gangster Tripping", "Praise You", and "Right Here, Right Now", all of which peaked within the top ten on the UK Singles Chart. "Build It Up – Tear It Down" was also released as a promotional single.

== Background ==
Cook bought obscure vinyl records and sampled elements that he liked. Throughout the 1990s he built up a library of these samples on floppy discs to create collages. He loaded these into an Akai S900 sampler connected via MIDI to an Atari ST computer with C-Lab Creator software to record and manipulate the samples. For most of the songs he added the bassline and sampled the other elements in a Big Beat style. In early 1998 Cook had success with several remixes while trying out some of the obscure records during his DJ sets. Through the use of a time-stretch method and collaborating with his mixer/engineer Simon Thornton, Cook compiled the songs at his home studio in Brighton, known as the House of Love.

== Title and artwork ==
The title You've Come a Long Way, Baby was derived from a marketing slogan for Virginia Slims cigarettes. The cover art, conceived by Red Design, uses a photograph of an obese young man dressed in a T-shirt bearing the words "I'm #1 so why try harder", wearing a WAKG pin-back button, while holding a cigarette. The photograph was taken at the 1983 Fat People's Festival in Danville, Virginia, spotted by Cook in the Guardian, and provided by the Rex Features photo library. Cook spent years attempting to identify the man on the cover, hoping to pay him, but as of 2025 had not been successful.

Additional photography for the You've Come a Long Way, Baby liner notes was provided by Simon Thornton. The cover image was changed in North America to an image of shelves stacked with records.

== Critical reception ==
Professional ratings
Review scores
Source	Rating
AllMusic	5/5 stars
Entertainment Weekly	B+
The Independent	4/5 stars
Muzik	4/5 stars
NME	8/10
Pitchfork	8.2/10 (1998); 8.5/10 (2024)
Q	4/5 stars
Rolling Stone	3/5 stars
Select	5/5
Spin	8/10

You've Come a Long Way, Baby was highly praised by critics. According to Stephen Thomas Erlewine of AllMusic, it "came damn close to being the definitive big beat album... a seamless record, filled with great imagination, unexpected twists and turns, huge hooks, and great beats." In 2000, the album was ranked number 81 in Q magazine's readers' poll of the "100 Greatest British Albums Ever". The album was also included in the book 1001 Albums You Must Hear Before You Die.

In 1999, it was certified 3× platinum by the British Phonographic Industry (BPI), 3×Platinum by the Australian Record Industry Association and platinum by the Recording Industry Association of America (RIAA).

== Track listing ==
No.	Title	Writer(s)	Length
1.	"Right Here, Right Now"	Norman Cook; Dale Peters; Joe Walsh	6:27
2.	"The Rockafeller Skank"	Cook; John Barry; Winifred Terry	6:53
3.	"Fucking in Heaven" ( (Note: Renamed "In Heaven" and "Illin in Heaven" on the North American version.))	Cook	3:55
4.	"Gangster Tripping"	Cook; Josh Davis; Sam Brox; Ganiyu Pierre Gasper; Stephen Jones; Nicholas Lockett; Myke Wilson	5:20
5.	"Build It Up – Tear It Down"	Cook; Patricia Miller	5:05
6.	"Kalifornia"	Cook; Mr. Natural	5:53
7.	"Soul Surfing"	Cook; Earl Nelson; Fred Smith	4:56
8.	"You're Not from Brighton"	Cook	5:20
9.	"Praise You"	Cook; Camille Yarbrough	5:23
10.	"Love Island"	Cook	5:18
11.	"Acid 8000"	Cook	7:28
Total length:			62:00

Notes

Japanese edition bonus track
No.	Title	Length
12.	"The World Went Down"	6:41
Total length:		68:41

Sample credits

- "Right Here, Right Now" contains samples of "Ashes, the Rain, and I", written by Dale Peters and Joe Walsh and performed by the James Gang, and a line from the 1995 Strange Days, spoken by actress Angela Bassett.
- "The Rockafeller Skank" contains samples of "Vinyl Dogs Vibe", written and performed by Lord Finesse, "Sliced Tomatoes", written by Winifred Terry and performed by the Just Brothers, "Beat Girl", written by John Barry and performed by John Barry and his Orchestra, "Join the Gang", written and performed by David Bowie, "I Fought the Law", written by Sonny Curtis and performed by the Bobby Fuller Four, "Who You Wit II", written and performed by Jay-Z, "Twistin' N' Twangin'", written and performed by Duane Eddy, "Why Can't You Love Me", written by Brian Poole and Alan Blakely and performed by Brian Poole and the Tremeloes, and "Soup", written by Karl "J.J." Johnson and performed by the J.J. All-Stars.
- "Gangster Trippin" contains samples of "Entropy", written and performed by DJ Shadow (Josh Davis), "Beatbox Wash", written and performed by the Dust Junkys (Sam Brox, Ganiyu Pierre Gasper, Stephen Jones, Nicholas Lockett and Myke Wilson), "Word Play" and "The Turntablist Anthem", written and performed by the X-Ecutioners, "Change the Mood", written and performed by Jackie Mittoo, "Sissy Walk", written by J.C. Hill, J. Stiles and J. Hopson and performed by Freedom Now Brothers, and "You Do It", written and performed by Ann Robinson.
- "Build It Up – Tear It Down" contains samples of "The Acid Test", written by Patricia Miller and performed by the Purple Fox.
- "Soul Surfing" contains samples of "I'll Do a Little Bit More", written by Earl Nelson and Fred Smith and performed by the Olympics.
- "Praise You" contains samples of "Take Yo Praise", written and performed by Camille Yarbrough, "Balance and Rehearsal", by the audio company JBL, "Lucky Man" written by Jim Peterson and performed by Steve Miller Band, "What I'd Say", written by Ray Charles and performed by Rare Earth, "Running Back to Me", written by Randy Oda, Tom Fogerty and Bobby Chocran and performed by Ruby, "You Should Be High Love", written by Billy Squier and Desmond Child and performed by Squier, "Joe Bell", written and performed by Isaac Hayes, "It's a Small World" from the album Mickey Mouse Disco, written by Robert B. Sherman and Richard M. Sherman, and the theme from the cartoon series Fat Albert and the Cosby Kids, written by Ricky Sheldon and Edward Fournier.

== Personnel ==
Credits for You've Come a Long Way, Baby adapted from liner notes.

- Norman Cook – performer, keyboards, synthesisers, bass, samplers, scratching, drum programming, production
- Red Design – photography
- Simon Thornton – engineering, mixing, photography
- Eve – provides the vocals for the song on "Cowboy".
- Freddy Fresh – provides the vocal sample for the song on "Fucking in Heaven".
- Myriam Tisler – provides the vocals for the song on "Radioactivity".

== Charts ==
=== Weekly charts ===
Chart (1998–2001)	Peak position
Australian Albums (ARIA)	2
Australian Dance Albums (ARIA)	1
Austrian Albums (Ö3 Austria)	13
Belgian Albums (Ultratop Flanders)	27
Belgian Albums (Ultratop Wallonia)	35
Canadian Albums (Billboard)	19
Finnish Albums (Suomen virallinen lista)	29
French Albums (SNEP)	10
German Albums (Offizielle Top 100)	15
Hungarian Albums (MAHASZ)	28
Irish Albums (IRMA)	19
New Zealand Albums (RMNZ)	1
Norwegian Albums (VG-lista)	20
Scottish Albums (Official Charts)	1
Swedish Albums (Sverigetopplistan)	24
Swiss Albums (Schweizer Hitparade)	23
UK Albums (Official Charts)	1
UK Independent Albums (Official Charts)	1
US Billboard 200	34
US Heatseekers Albums (Billboard)	2
US Top Dance Albums (Billboard)	17

=== Year-end charts ===
Chart (1998)	Position
UK Albums (OCC)	50

Chart (1999)	Position
Australian Albums (ARIA)	10
Belgian Albums (Ultratop Flanders)	70
Dutch Albums (Album Top 100)	81
French Albums (SNEP)	44
German Albums (Offizielle Top 100)	48
UK Albums (OCC)	13
US Billboard 200	93

Chart (2000)	Position
Australian Albums (ARIA)	83
UK Albums (OCC)	85

Chart (2018)	Position
US Vinyl Albums (Billboard)	11

== Certifications ==
Certifications for You've Come a Long Way, Baby
Region	Certification	Certified units/sales
Australia (ARIA)	3× Platinum	210,000^{^}
Canada (Music Canada)	Platinum	100,000^{^}
France (SNEP)	Platinum	300,000^{*}
Japan (RIAJ)	Gold	100,000^{^}
Netherlands (NVPI)	Gold	50,000^{^}
New Zealand (RMNZ)	4× Platinum	60,000^{^}
Switzerland (IFPI Switzerland)	Gold	25,000^{^}
United Kingdom (BPI)	4× Platinum	1,200,000^{*}
United States (RIAA)	Platinum	1,400,000
Summaries
Europe (IFPI)	2× Platinum	2,000,000^{*}
Worldwide	—	5,000,000
^{*} Sales figures based on certification alone.^{^} Shipments figures based on certification alone.

== Release history ==
Region	Date	Label	Format	Catalog no.
United Kingdom	19 October 1998	Skint Records	CD	BRASSIC 11CD
United Kingdom	19 October 1998	Skint Records	LP	BRASSIC 11LP
United States	20 October 1998	Astralwerks	LP	ASW 66247-1
United States	20 October 1998	Astralwerks	Cassette	ASW 66247
United States	20 October 1998	Astralwerks	CD	ASW 66247-2
United Kingdom	4 December 1998	Skint Records	MiniDisc	BRASSIC 11MD
Japan	6 April 1999	Skint Records	CD	SKI 491973
Japan	13 July 1999	Sony Music Entertainment	CD (limited edition)	ESCA 491973
United Kingdom	22 September 2009	Skint Records	CD (deluxe edition)	BRASSIC 56CD
