= Don't Think Twice (Rita Ora song) =

2023 single by Rita Ora

Single by Rita Ora

from the album You & I
- Released: 30 June 2023
- Genre: UK garage
- Length: 2:49 (radio edit); 3:06 (album version)
- Label: BMG
- Songwriters: Rita Ora; Nate Cyphert; Warren Felder; Alex Niceforo; Jamie Sanderson; Keith Sorrells; Rollo
- Producers: Alex Niceforo; Jaime Sorrells; Mark Ralph; Oak Felder

Rita Ora singles chronology
"Praising You" (2023)	"Don't Think Twice" (2023)	"Drinkin'" (2023)

Music video
- "Don't Think Twice" on YouTube

"Don't Think Twice" is a song by British singer Rita Ora. The song was released on 30 June 2023 through BMG, as the third single from her third studio album You & I (2023).

== Background ==
"Don't Think Twice" was released as the third single from Ora's third studio album, You & I. Numéro Netherlands described the song as an "infectious, upbeat floor filler" about the "beginning moments of a relationship", iNews described it as a "flush-with-lust garage-dance song", while Rolling Stone described it as "UK garage meets Gloria Gaynor."

== Music video ==
The accompanying music video, shot in New Zealand, was directed by the New Zealand filmmaker, Taika Waititi.

== Track listings ==
- Digital download
1. "Don't Think Twice" [Edit] – 2:49
2. "Don't Think Twice" – 3:06

== Charts ==
=== Weekly charts ===
Weekly chart performance for "Don't Think Twice"
Chart (2023–2024)	Peak position
Belarus Airplay (TopHit)	1
CIS Airplay (TopHit)	1
Estonia Airplay (TopHit)	45
Kazakhstan Airplay (TopHit)	2
Latvia Airplay (TopHit)	13
Russia Airplay (TopHit)	1
South Korea BGM (Circle)	98
Ukraine Airplay (TopHit)	9
UK Singles Downloads (Official Charts)	27

=== Monthly charts ===
Monthly chart performance for "Don't Think Twice"
Chart (2023–2024)	Peak position
Belarus Airplay (TopHit)	1
CIS Airplay (TopHit)	1
Estonia Airplay (TopHit)	57
Kazakhstan Airplay (TopHit)	2
Latvia Airplay (TopHit)	10
Russia Airplay (TopHit)	2
Ukraine Airplay (TopHit)	10

=== Year-end charts ===
Year-end chart performance for "Don't Think Twice"
Chart (2023)	Position
Belarus Airplay (TopHit)	32
CIS Airplay (TopHit)	31
Kazakhstan Airplay (TopHit)	57
Russia Airplay (TopHit)	17

Chart (2024)	Position
Belarus Airplay (TopHit)	25
CIS Airplay (TopHit)	61
Russia Airplay (TopHit)	81

2025 year-end chart performance for "Don't Think Twice"
Chart (2025)	Peak position
Belarus Airplay (TopHit)	143

=== Decade-end charts ===
20s Decade-end chart performance for "Don't Think Twice"
Chart (2020–2025)	Position
Belarus Airplay (TopHit)	93
CIS Airplay (TopHit)	131
Russia Airplay (TopHit)	126
