= Just Brothers =

US musical ensemble

Just Brothers was the American musical duo of the brothers Jimmy and Frank Bryant and several session musicians.

== Origins ==
Frank Bryant became a session musician in the mid-1960s in his hometown Detroit, while Jimmy was completing military service. His early credits included the bassline on Gino Washington's "Gino Is a Coward" and vocals on J.J. Barnes' "Lonely No More" at Mickay's Records. Frank also co-wrote J.J.'s "Deeper in Love", and Steve Mancha's "Let's Party."

== Music ==
After Jimmy's return, the Bryant Brothers were recruited into a session group for Winifred Terry of the Drifters by the group's drummer Richard Allen. The session was intended to record a song called "Honey" and a B-side. The musical tracks were completed when the hired vocalist was deemed unfit to record the song. Frank took the opportunity to point out his and Jimmy's vocal talent. Convinced by Bryant, Terry agreed to give them a stab at recording the two songs. At the subsequent session Bryant Brothers sang on "Honey" and their songs "Things Will Get Better" and "She Broke His Heart."

The track recorded to be the B-side was titled "Sliced Tomatoes", and released in 1965 backed with "Things Will Get Better", on the Lupine record label. Later that year a pairing of "She Broke His Heart" and "Things Will Get Better" was released on Terry's Empire Record Label. "Carlena" was released on Terry's Garrison label. None of the tracks were successful and the Bryant Brothers returned to session work.

In 1969, with new member Willie Kendrick, the Just Brothers negotiated a deal at Johnny Nash's Jomada label. They recorded one unreleased track before being dropped by the label. Terry helped out the group again organizing the re-release of "Sliced Tomatoes" on the Music Merchant label in 1972. The Just Brothers recorded two new tracks, "Tears Ago" and "You've Got The Love To Make Me Over", for the Music Merchant label originally meant for an uncompleted album. These ended up backing "Sliced Tomatoes" on its single releases. "Sliced Tomatoes" became a Northern soul staple. The song was later sampled in Fatboy Slim's 1998 single "The Rockafeller Skank". In 2009, it was used in Welsh public information film, Cow.

== Later work ==
The Bryant Brothers later fronted a local group named the Firebirds. Jimmy Bryant died in 1996.
