= Going Out of My Head =

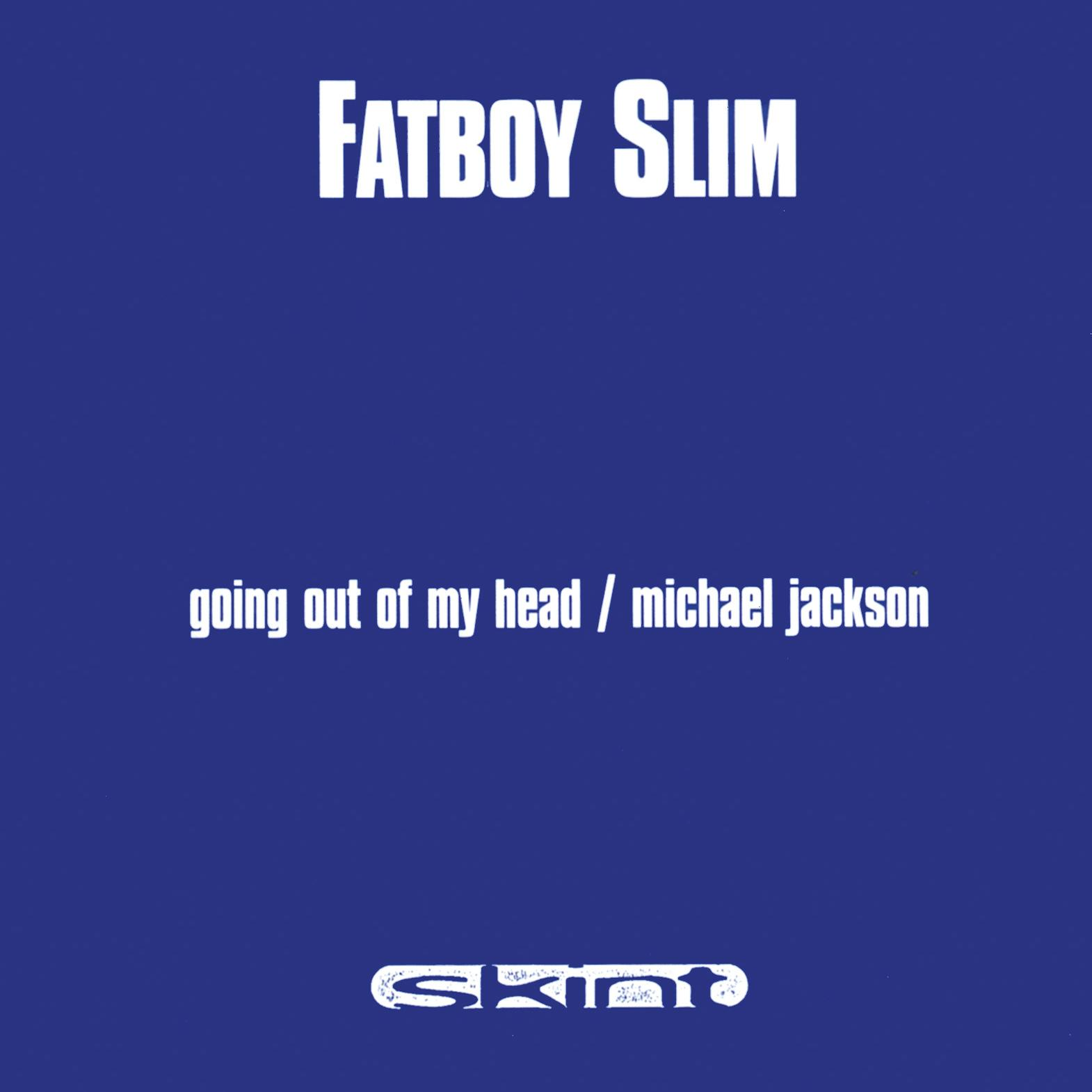
- iTunes cover

Single by Fatboy Slim

from the album Better Living Through Chemistry
- A-side: "Michael Jackson"
- Released: 21 April 1997
- Genre: Big beat, alternative dance, electronic rock
- Label: Skint, Astralwerks/Caroline/Virgin
- Songwriters: Norman Cook, Pete Townshend
- Producer: Norman Cook

Fatboy Slim singles chronology
"Punk to Funk" (1996)	"Going Out of My Head" (1997)	"The Rockafeller Skank" (1998)

"Going Out of My Head" is a song by British big beat musician Fatboy Slim. It was released as a double A-side single with "Michael Jackson", released as the third and final single from his debut studio album Better Living Through Chemistry on 21 April 1997. The song contains prominent samples from Yvonne Elliman's "I Can't Explain" and Led Zeppelin's "The Crunge". It was featured in the films The Jackal and Like Mike.

== Background and composition ==
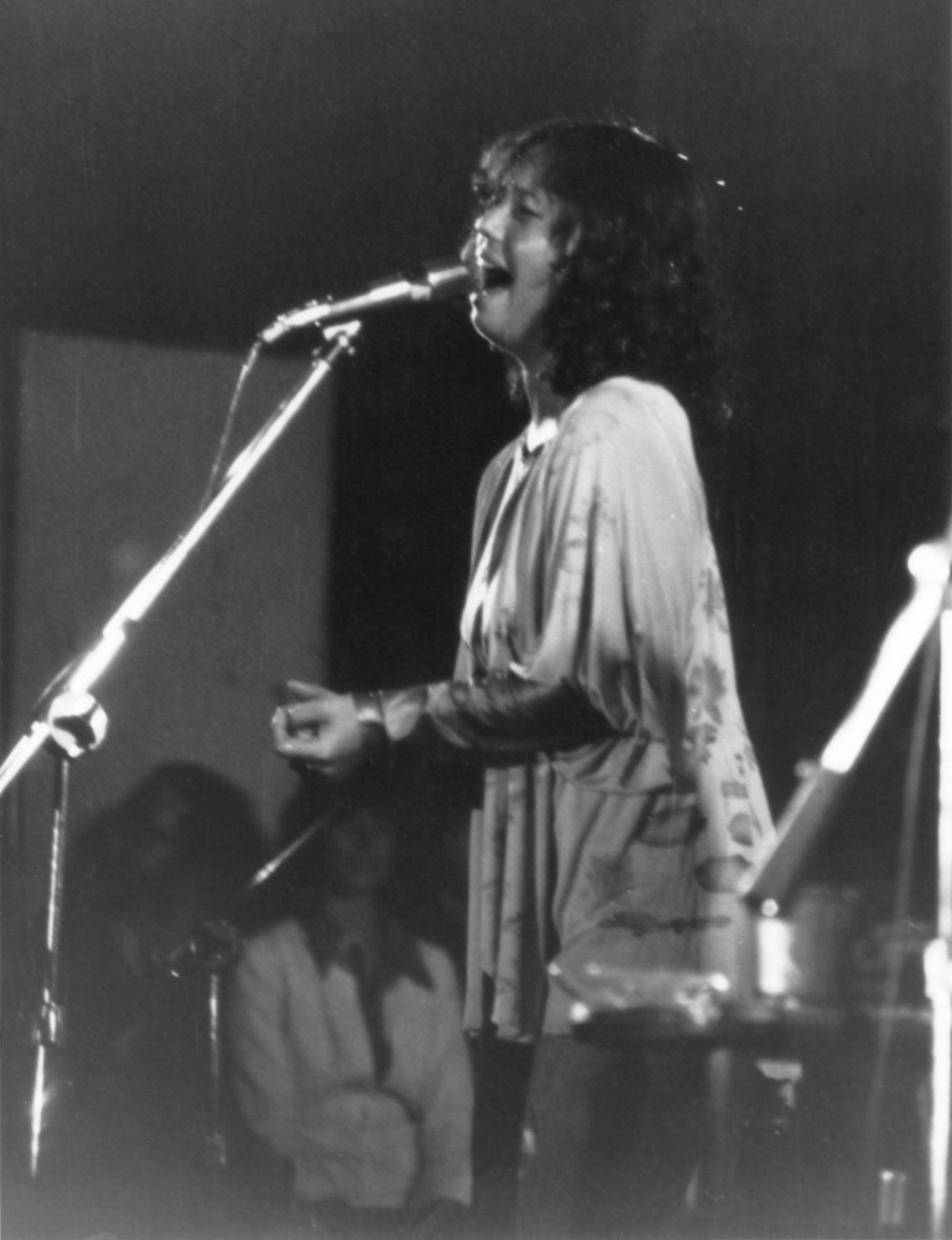
Samples from American singer Yvonne Elliman's "I Can't Explain" are present in "Going Out of My Head".

Produced by Fatboy Slim for his debut studio album Better Living Through Chemistry (1996), "Going Out of My Head" features guitar riff samples from American singer Yvonne Elliman's cover version of "I Can't Explain", originally performed by English rock band The Who. It also samples drums from "The Crunge" by English rock band Led Zeppelin. A big beat song, "Going Out of My Head" incorporates musical elements such as shuffle drum beats and "Space Age sound effects" into its instrumentation. Primarily an instrumental track, the song's vocals consist solely of a repeating sample of a voice singing "Going out of my mind." Journalist Yoshi Kato, writing for the book 1001 Songs You Must Hear Before You Die, describes it as a "groovy dance-rock hybrid". Jon Dolan of City Pages remarked that the song "transmogrif[ies] '64 mod into '97 postmod" with its looping of the "I Can't Explain" riff around a "space-funk tune". "Michael Jackson" features samples of "Straight Outta Compton" by N.W.A, "Michael Jackson" by Negativland and "What Have We Got" by Sham 69.

== Critical reception ==
"Going Out of My Head" received generally positive reviews from contemporary music critics. John Harris of The Independent on Sunday praised the song's samples of "I Can't Explain" as "extremely artful", while Mark Jenkins of The Washington Post cited it as the album's most effective tracks. Adam Webb of the Daily Herald published a rave review of "Going Out of My Head", writing that it "has the potential to be one of the first techno tracks to cross over into rock anthem territory." Nathan Brackett of Rolling Stone was less favourable, remarking that the song "strays into novelty."

== Release ==
"Going Out of My Head" was released as the third single from Better Living Through Chemistry on 21 April 1997. Fatboy Slim selected the song for release as a single at the insistence of his close friends, British electronic music duo The Chemical Brothers. It became the first Fatboy Slim release to enter the top 100 of the UK Singles Chart, debuting at its peak position of number 57 on the chart week of 3 May 1997. The single earned Fatboy Slim a place in the Guinness Book of Records for being the artist with the most entries on the UK Singles Chart under different pseudonyms. He had previously entered the chart under a number of different stage names, including Mighty Dub Katz and Pizzaman. "Going Out of My Head" also became Fatboy Slim's first single to chart in the United States, peaking at number 28 on the Billboard Alternative Songs chart.

Initially, Fatboy Slim and his label Skint Records did not get proper clearance for the song's samples of "I Can't Explain". When "Going Out of My Head" was later selected for inclusion on the soundtrack of the 1997 film The Jackal, The Who lead guitarist Pete Townshend – who had been given an advance listening of the soundtrack – recognized the samples and reportedly "flipped his wig". Townshend was later given songwriting credits on "Going Out of My Head" for use of the samples, while Fatboy Slim subsequently had to give up publishing royalties for the song. Regarding the sample clearance issue, he later quipped: "I usually fly by on the seat of my pants... but every now and then I get caught."

== Music video ==
The music video for "Going Out of My Head" was directed by Doug Aitken. Featuring various breakdancers performing a b-boy routine to the song, the clip received heavy airplay on the MTV television network. It was later nominated for Dance Video of the Year at the 1997 Music Video Production Association (MVPA) Awards. The Washington Post cited the video in an article detailing the late 1990s revival of breakdancing culture.

== Charts ==
Chart (1997)	Peak position
UK Singles (Official Charts)	57
US Alternative Airplay (Billboard)	28
