= Gangster Tripping =

1998 single by Fatboy Slim

"Gangster Trippin"

Single by Fatboy Slim

from the album You've Come a Long Way, Baby
- B-side: "The World Went Down"; "Jack It Up (DJ Delite)"
- Released: 5 October 1998
- Length: 5:20
- Label: Skint
- Songwriters: Fatboy Slim; DJ Shadow; Dust Junkys
- Producer: Fatboy Slim

Fatboy Slim singles chronology
"The Rockafeller Skank" (1998)	"Gangster Trippin" (1998)	"Praise You" (1999)

"Gangster Tripping" (released as a single under the name "Gangster Trippin", which is also the title of the clean version that censors profanity) is a song by British big beat musician Fatboy Slim. It was released on 5 October 1998 as the second single from his second studio album, You've Come a Long Way, Baby (1998).

== Samples ==
The song contains samples from "Entropy" by DJ Shadow, "Word Play" and "The Turntablist Anthem" by the X-Ecutioners, "Beatbox Wash" by the Dust Junkys (this track contains the song's chorus line), "Change the Mood" by Jackie Mittoo, "Sissy Walk" by Freedom Now Brothers, and "You Did It" by Ann Robinson. The song was featured in the 2006 PlayStation Portable game Lumines II and the 1999 film Go. The single peaked at No. 3 in the United Kingdom and No. 49 in Switzerland.

The recognizable "We gotta kick that gangsta shit" sample comes from the first recorded live performance by jazz rap duo Pete Rock & CL Smooth (sampled by DJ Shadow on "Entropy"). In the radio cut, it was re-edited for censorship purposes.

In 2013, Nicky Lockett (aka MC Tunes) of the Dust Junkys won a three-year court case to recover unpaid royalties for use of his vocals in the main chorus of the song.

== Music video ==
The music video for "Gangster Trippin", directed by Roman Coppola, consists simply of scenes of furniture sets exploding, shown from multiple angles, and often in slow-motion. Fatboy Slim himself makes a cameo in the video, being shown on a photograph on the mirror where a lady stands up from. According to MTV at the time, the script for the video contained just one line: "Blow stuff up".

The video shows certain similarities to the ending of Antonioni's Zabriskie Point where several pieces of furniture are blown up similarly in slow motion and from different angles. Director Coppola often praised the works of Antonioni in interviews.

== Track listings ==
Standard CD, 12-inch, and cassette single

1. "Gangster Trippin"
2. "The World Went Down"
3. "Jack It Up (DJ Delite)"

European CD single

1. "Gangster Trippin"
2. "The World Went Down"

Japanese CD single

1. "Gangster Trippin" (radio edit)
2. "Gangster Trippin" (full version)
3. "Jack It Up (DJ Delite)"

== Charts ==
=== Weekly charts ===
Chart (1998)	Peak position
Australia (ARIA)	75
Europe (Eurochart Hot 100)	20
Finland (Suomen virallinen lista)	6
Germany (GfK)	98
Iceland (Íslenski Listinn Topp 40)	14
Ireland (IRMA)	17
Italy (Musica e dischi)	13
Netherlands (Single Top 100)	68
New Zealand (Recorded Music NZ)	32
Scotland Singles (OCC)	5
Sweden (Sverigetopplistan)	49
Switzerland (Schweizer Hitparade)	49
UK Singles (OCC)	3
UK Dance (OCC)	3
UK Indie (OCC)	1

=== Year-end charts ===
Chart (1998)	Position
UK Singles (OCC)	106

== Certifications ==
Region	Certification	Certified units/sales
United Kingdom (BPI)	Silver	200,000^{^}
^{^} Shipments figures based on certification alone.

== Release history ==
Region	Date	Format(s)	Label(s)	Ref.
United Kingdom	5 October 1998	12-inch vinyl; CD; cassette	Skint	
Japan	14 October 1998	CD	Skint	
United States	20 July 1999	Alternative radio	Astralwerks; Skint	
