= Camille Yarbrough =

American film producer

- Born: January 8, 1934 (age 92); Chicago, Illinois, U.S.
- Occupations: Singer, dancer, actress, poet, activist, television producer, author
- Notable work: "Take Yo' Praise" (later sampled by Fatboy Slim in "Praise You")

Camille Yarbrough (born January 8, 1934) is an American singer, dancer, actress, poet, activist, television producer, and author. She is best known for the song "Take Yo' Praise", which was later sampled by Fatboy Slim in his song "Praise You". "Take Yo' Praise" was originally recorded in 1975 for Yarbrough's debut album, The Iron Pot Cooker, released on Vanguard Records. Yarbrough stated that the song was written for "all the people who had come through the black civil rights movement, who had stood up for truth and righteousness and justice, because human beings need to praise and respect one another more than they do". The Iron Pot Cooker was based on the 1971 stage dramatization of Yarbrough's one-woman, spoken word show, Tales and Tunes of an African American Griot. She toured nationally with this show during the 1970s and 1980s. Yarbrough's second album, Ancestor House, is a spoken word/soul/blues album that she released on her own record label, Maat Music, in 2003. Ancestor House was recorded live at Joe's Pub in New York City.

== Biography ==
Yarbrough was born in 1934 and raised in the South Side of Chicago. She was the seventh and youngest child in her family. In her teens she was a dancer with the Katherine Dunham Company.

Tales and Tunes of an African American Griot was produced at La MaMa Experimental Theatre Club in the East Village of Manhattan in 1973.

A vocal sample from the opening of Yarbrough's "Take Yo' Praise" features prominently in the 1998 song "Praise You" by Fatboy Slim. In a 2021 interview with the website WhoSampled, Yarbrough said that she liked "Praise You" and its use of her vocals, feeling that Norman Cook (Fatboy Slim's real name) kept the essence of "Take Yo' Praise".

Journalist Kevin Powell wrote, regarding her first album: "Without question, The Iron Pot Cooker is a precursor to Lauryn Hill's best-seller The Mis-Education [sic] of Lauryn Hill." Other reviews of this album include Billboard: "Yarbrough has stylish traces of Nina Simone and Gil Scott-Heron but her own style of singing and recitation ... are outstanding. Her songs are all thought provoking", Spin: "Nana Camille is a 'hip-hop foremother'", and CDNow: "The most important rediscovery of the year …"

In 1979 she authored (with illustrator Carole Byard) the children's book Cornrows, which won the Coretta Scott King Award.

She resides in New York City.
