= Right Here, Right Now (Fatboy Slim song) =

1999 single by Fatboy Slim

Single by Fatboy Slim

from the album You've Come a Long Way, Baby
- B-side: "Don't Forget Your Teeth"
- Released: 19 April 1999
- Genre: Big beat
- Length: 6:27 (album version); 5:58 (single version); 3:56 (radio edit)
- Label: Skint
- Songwriters: Norman Cook; Dale Peters; Joe Walsh
- Producer: Fatboy Slim

Fatboy Slim singles chronology
"Praise You" (1999)	"Right Here, Right Now" (1999)	"Build It Up – Tear It Down" (1999)

Music video
- "Right Here, Right Now" on YouTube

"Right Here, Right Now" is a song by British big beat musician Fatboy Slim, released on 19 April 1999 as the fourth single from his second studio album, You've Come a Long Way, Baby (1998). The song samples "Ashes, the Rain & I" by James Gang, from their 1970 album James Gang Rides Again, and an Angela Bassett quote from the American science fiction thriller film Strange Days (1995).

"Right Here, Right Now" reached number two on the UK Singles Chart and became a top-40 hit in Australia, Greece, Iceland, Ireland, New Zealand, and the Walloon region of Belgium. The song's popularity was spread across Europe through viral use in advertisements by companies such as Adidas or Nissan. It was voted by Mixmag readers as the 10th-greatest dance record of all time.

== Critical reception ==
The Scottish newspaper Daily Record called the song "brilliant". In February 2013, Mixmag readers voted for it to be number 10 on a list of 50 of the greatest dance tracks.

== Music video ==
The music video for the song, created by Hammer & Tongs, is an elaborate homage to the famous opening sequence of the French educational series Once Upon a Time... Man. It shows a timeline depicting the entire process of human evolution condensed into three and a half minutes. The beginning of the music video is set "350 billion years ago" and starts with a single-celled eukaryote in the ocean transforming into a jellyfish, an aquatic worm-like creature, a pipefish, a pufferfish, and then a barracuda-like fish. It manages to eat a smaller fish before leaping up onto dry land. With a tyrannosaur visible in the background and a mantis in front, it stays still for a few seconds, becoming a primitive amphibian-like Tetrapod similar to Hynerpeton before setting off and eating the insect, while a volcano erupts in the background.

The amphibian transforms into a small alligator as it enters a forest. It sees a tall tree, which it climbs up. Its body is obscured by the tree as its hands visibly change into those of three different primates until it arrives at the top as an ape that vaguely resembles a chimpanzee. It jumps from the tree into an icy landscape, enduring a blizzard as it morphs into a larger, gorilla-like ape.

At the end of a large cliff, the ape beats its chest as the camera zooms out to show a vast desert. The ape jumps onto the ground, where it begins running. A large storm blows away much of its hair, turning it into a hominid reminiscent of a homo erectus (at this point, the timer at the bottom right slows dramatically). It runs faster and puts on some trousers and a T-shirt with the logo "I'm #1 so why try harder?". When fully clothed, it turns into a modern human with a beard and dons a pair of sunglasses.

The man walks through a city environment, eating one bite of a hamburger (taken from a cardboard cutout of Fatboy Slim himself) and throwing the rest aside. He pulls off his facial hair and morphs into the obese character depicted on the cover of the album. Finally he sits down to rest on a bench as night falls, then smiles and leans back to look up as the constellation of Orion appears above.

== Track listings ==
UK and Australian CD single; UK 12-inch single

1. "Right Here, Right Now"
2. "Don't Forget Your Teeth"
3. "Praise You" (original version)

UK cassette single and European CD single

1. "Right Here, Right Now"
2. "Don't Forget Your Teeth"

== Charts ==
=== Weekly charts ===
Chart (1999)	Peak position
Australia (ARIA)	28
Belgium (Ultratip Bubbling Under Flanders)	5
Belgium (Ultratop 50 Wallonia)	37
Europe (Eurochart Hot 100)	12
France (SNEP)	56
Germany (GfK)	47
Greece (IFPI)	6
Iceland (Íslenski Listinn Topp 40)	2
Ireland (IRMA)	13
Netherlands (Single Top 100)	56
New Zealand (Recorded Music NZ)	25
Scottish Singles Sales (Official Charts)	3
Sweden (Sverigetopplistan)	54
UK Singles (Official Charts)	2
UK Dance (Official Charts)	2
UK Independent (Official Charts)	1

Chart (2022)	Peak position
Hungary (Single Top 40)	23

=== Year-end charts ===
Chart (1999)	Position
UK Singles (OCC)	77

== Certifications ==
Region	Certification	Certified units/sales
Brazil (Pro-Música Brasil)	Gold	30,000^{*}
New Zealand (RMNZ)	Platinum	30,000^{‡}
United Kingdom (BPI)	2× Platinum	1,200,000^{‡}
^{*} Sales figures based on certification alone.^{‡} Sales+streaming figures based on certification alone.

== In popular culture ==
In 2004, then–Leader of the Labour Party Tony Blair used the song during a Labour Party conference without Cook's permission, just one year after the start of the Iraq War. Cook opposed its usage, claiming that the usage "implies that I support Blair. Nothing could be further from the truth."

On 8 October 2019, Fatboy Slim made a remix of the song using environmental activist Greta Thunberg's United Nations speech.

The song was used for the opening sequence of the pilot episode for the television series Third Watch. It was featured in trailers for The Virgin Suicides, Crank, and Carnage.
