= The Rockafeller Skank =

1998 single by Fatboy Slim

Single by Fatboy Slim

from the album You've Come a Long Way, Baby
- B-side: "Always Read the Label"; "Tweakers Delight"
- Released: 8 June 1998
- Genre: Big beat; breakbeat; surf rock
- Length: 6:53 (album version); 3:27 (radio edit); 4:03 (short and video version)
- Label: Skint
- Songwriters: Norman Cook; John Barry; Winford Terry
- Producer: Fatboy Slim

Fatboy Slim singles chronology
"Going Out of My Head" (1997)	"The Rockafeller Skank" (1998)	"Gangster Tripping" (1998)

Music video
- "The Rockafeller Skank" on YouTube

"The Rockafeller Skank" is a song by English big beat musician and DJ Fatboy Slim. It was released as the lead single from his second studio album, You've Come a Long Way, Baby (1998), on 8 June 1998. The single peaked at number six on the UK Singles Chart in June 1998 and topped the Icelandic Singles Chart for a week the same month. It was the second Fatboy Slim single (after "Praise You") to chart on the US Billboard Hot 100, peaking at number 76. In 2022 and 2025, Rolling Stone and Billboard magazine included "The Rockafeller Skank" in their lists of the greatest dance songs of all time, at 199 and 83 respectively.

== Critical reception ==
Larry Flick from Billboard wrote, "Using self-consciously old-school DJ techniques (scratching and repetition of a spoken phrase, dramatic tempo changes), Fatboy Slim has created an organically simple masterpiece. With the accessibility of Beck, the danceability of ska, and the sunny quality of the Beach Boys, the track has a sparse, magnetic beginning that builds in depth and intensity (with the addition of jangly guitar riffs and more complex beats) to a meticulous, frenetic climax. And the wind-down is no less danceable."

Will Hermes from Entertainment Weekly called it a "remarkable splice-rock roller coaster". He added, "Big, dynamic, spectacularly dumb, it grafts Duane Eddy guitar twang (via John Barry) onto Godzilla-goes-Motown beats, adds an MC non sequitur, and presses "frappe" on the digital blender. Result? The most potent DJ pop since "Firestarter". If this won't convert the techno-phobes, nothing will."

A reviewer from Music & Media stated that the track "easily matches the extremely high quality one would expect from a chart veteran with such names as the Housemartins, Beats International, The Mighty Dubcats and Pizzaman on his CV." He explained further, "This time around, he's somehow managed to fuse big beat and dance with surf—seasoned with a slight pinch of punk—and has come up with what is probably the single most infectious sound around on the airwaves right now."

== Music video ==
The music video, directed by Doug Aitken, starts with two men and a woman stealing from the supermarket in the background. (Known as Supermercado) As the song kicks in, they suddenly start running with wild, exaggerated energy — spinning, flipping, and popping in the middle of sidewalks, crosswalks, and public spaces. A woman in a car then comes to the market, wondering what was happening, as she drives off, shaking her head, before putting on an eight track tape from Fatboy Slim. (Most Likely to be Better Living Through Chemistry) When its day time, you will see the car go past two men who are dancing with a boombox, listening to the song, until meeting one with a car that starts dancing too. They then walk to a hotel, meet someone, and do a coin flip for them to come in. Once they are in, All 4 starts dancing, while 1 reveals a window with Fatboy Slim on a DJ Kit.

It then all changes as one of the same men from the start of the video enters a club, and then goes past a table with the sentence "Right About Now, The Funk Soul Brother." The mood then changes, with a cowboy lip syncing the song, until a woman puts on The Rockafeller Skank on a jukebox, with the cowboy breaking his drink, and the DJ playing the song, with people dancing, and blowing bubblegum. It then turns to a man sleeping, until the scene changes to the beach, where they are driving a buggy, as they go surfing. A record player hovers over the sea while they show close-up shots of surfing, until the Vinyl Player explodes at the end, and shows the last close-up shot of a man surfing.

Spike Jonze created an audition tape with the fictional dance company Torrance Community Dance Group performing to "The Rockafeller Skank"; a copy of this audition is featured on Fatboy Slim's Why Make Videos DVD. Jonze and the dance troupe would go on to create the official video for "Praise You". Fatboy Slim said it was a good idea, but he didn't really like it.

VH1 ranked "The Rockafeller Skank" as #95 in their 100 Greatest Songs of the 90s.

== Samples ==
The song features the repeated line "Right about now, the funk soul brother / Check it out now, the funk soul brother", which is a truncated vocal sample of rapper Lord Finesse on the track "Vinyl Dogs Vibe" by Vinyl Dogs. The original line, a spoken-word introduction to the instrumental track, was "Check it out right about now, it's no other than the funk soul brother, the Lord Finesse. And you're welcome to the world of the Vinyl Dogs right about now".

Lord Finesse spoke about his "contribution" for the first time in 2019. He recalled receiving a fax about Fatboy Slim wanting to use his vocal sample for "The Rockafeller Skank", to which he agreed. However, he was shocked to learn the song was not what he had in mind, thinking it was going to be hip-hop and not big beat. He called it a "big mistake" and expressed regret for not listening to the song first before sending his approval and not having someone look at the contract before he signed it. Regardless, Lord Finesse remains proud of the success of "The Rockafeller Skank" but says it could have been his "retirement money".

The song also features eight other samples, including a sample of the song "Sliced Tomatoes" by the band Just Brothers (a popular Northern soul track); The Bobby Fuller Four's "I Fought the Law" (featuring DeWayne Quirico's drum intro); "Join the Gang" by David Bowie; "Who You Wit II" by Jay-Z (pitched down vocals saying "Rockafeller"); and a sample of "Beat Girl" by John Barry and his Orchestra. Guitar lines were also sampled from "Twistin' 'N' Twangin'" by Duane Eddy and "Why Can't You Love Me" by Brian Poole & The Tremeloes, along with a shout from the song "Soup" by the J.J. All-Stars.

Fatboy Slim has stated that to clear the samples and release the song he had to release 100% of the track's royalties, meaning he receives no royalties himself.

On the album, the track is preceded by a short conversation between a radio DJ and a caller named Brad requesting the song. A real conversation that took place on Boston station WBCN (now known as WBMX), the tape was played for Fatboy Slim, who persuaded the station to allow him to use the audio on the album.

== Legacy ==
In 2022, Rolling Stone ranked "The Rockafeller Skank" number 199 in their list of the "200 Greatest Dance Songs of All Time". In 2025, Billboard magazine ranked it number 83 in their list of "The 100 Best Dance Songs of All Time", writing, "Fatboy Slim created a kaleidoscope of sound that's hypnotic and repetitive, but still manages to shift tempos and styles in the dazzling display from 1998, the era in which the English producer born Norman Cook was crossing over hard into pop culture (and the Hot 100) with his litany of era-defining hits. [...] Cook basically Frankensteins together the song from various elements, while adding his own flair to create the big beat essential."

=== "Satisfaction Skank" ===
On 11 December 2025, Cook released "Satisfaction Skank", a mashup of "The Rockafeller Skank" incorporating elements of the Rolling Stones' 1965 song "(I Can't Get No) Satisfaction". Cook had played the remix in his DJ sets for years, and it became one of the world's most bootlegged recordings. It was blocked from release until the Rolling Stones' management agreed to license its sample after several refusals. The Rolling Stones delivered the master tapes to Cook so he could create a higher-quality mix.

== Track listings ==
- UK and Australian CD single
- US maxi-CD and cassette single
1. "The Rockafeller Skank" (short edit)
2. "The Rockafeller Skank"
3. "Always Read the Label"
4. "Tweakers Delight"
- UK and US 12-inch single

A1. "The Rockafeller Skank"
B1. "Always Read the Label"
B2. "Tweakers Delight"

- UK cassette single and European CD single
1. "The Rockafeller Skank" (short edit)
2. "Always Read the Label"
- Japanese CD single
1. "The Rockafeller Skank" (short edit)
2. "The Rockafeller Skank"
3. "Always Read the Label"
4. "Tweakers Delight"
5. "Everybody Loves a Carnival" (radio edit)

== Charts ==
=== Weekly charts ===
Chart (1998–2000)	Peak position
Australia (ARIA)	32
Austria (Ö3 Austria Top 40)	23
Belgium (Ultratip Bubbling Under Flanders)	5
Canada (Nielsen SoundScan)	18
Canada Top Singles (RPM)	49
Canada Dance/Urban (RPM)	4
Denmark (IFPI)	12
Estonia (Eesti Top 20)	7
Europe (Eurochart Hot 100)	40
France (SNEP)	69
Germany (GfK)	28
Iceland (Íslenski Listinn Topp 40)	1
Ireland (IRMA)	15
Italy (Musica e dischi)	17
Netherlands (Single Top 100)	45
New Zealand (Recorded Music NZ)	17
Norway (VG-lista)	20
Scottish Singles Sales (Official Charts)	6
Sweden (Sverigetopplistan)	16
Switzerland (Schweizer Hitparade)	24
UK Singles (Official Charts)	6
UK Dance (Official Charts)	2
UK Independent (Official Charts)	1
US Billboard Hot 100	76
US Alternative Airplay (Billboard)	39
US Dance Singles Sales (Billboard)	2
US Pop Airplay (Billboard)	21

Chart (2026)	Peak position
Germany (Deutsche Dance Charts)	14
Latvia Airplay (LaIPA)	10

=== Year-end charts ===
Chart (1998)	Position
Canada Dance/Urban (RPM)	17
Iceland (Íslenski Listinn Topp 40)	61
Sweden (Hitlistan)	99
UK Singles (OCC)	99
US Maxi-Singles Sales (Billboard)	15

Chart (1999)	Position
US Maxi-Singles Sales (Billboard)	10

Chart (2000)	Position
US Mainstream Top 40 (Billboard)	100

== Certifications and sales ==
Region	Certification	Certified units/sales
New Zealand (RMNZ)	Platinum	30,000^{‡}
United Kingdom (BPI)	Platinum	600,000^{‡}
United States	—	141,000
^{‡} Sales+streaming figures based on certification alone.

== Release history ==
Region	Date	Format(s)	Label(s)	Ref.
United Kingdom	8 June 1998	12-inch vinyl; CD; cassette	Skint	
Japan	17 June 1998	CD	Skint	
United States	28 September 1999	Contemporary hit radio	Skint; Astralwerks	
