= Praise You =

1999 single by Fatboy Slim

Single by Fatboy Slim

from the album You've Come a Long Way, Baby
- B-side: "Sho Nuff"
- Released: 4 January 1999
- Genre: Big beat; pop
- Length: 5:23 (album version); 3:48 (radio edit)
- Label: Skint
- Songwriters: Norman Cook; Camille Yarbrough
- Producer: Fatboy Slim

Fatboy Slim singles chronology
"Gangster Tripping" (1998)	"Praise You" (1999)	"Right Here, Right Now" (1999)

Music video
- "Praise You" by Fatboy Slim on YouTube

Audio
- "Praise You" (album version) by Fatboy Slim on YouTube

"Praise You" is a song by the English big beat musician Fatboy Slim. It was released as the third single from his second studio album, You've Come a Long Way, Baby (1998), on 4 January 1999. It reached number one in the United Kingdom and Iceland, number four in Canada, number six in Ireland, and number 36 in the United States. As of 1999, it had sold over 150,000 copies in the US.

== Samples ==
Nine samples are used in the song "Praise You". It features a prominent vocal sample from the opening of "Take Yo' Praise" (1975) by Camille Yarbrough, as well as a prominent piano sample from the track "Balance and Rehearsal" from a test album, Sessions, released by the audio electronics company JBL in 1973. That recording session was for "Captain America", sung by Hoyt Axton; a snippet of Axton's vocals humming the "Captain America" melody can be heard in the album version of "Praise You" found on Fatboy Slim's You've Come a Long Way, Baby.

"Praise You" also features a guitar sample from the opening of "It's a Small World" from the Disneyland Records album Mickey Mouse Disco, Michael Gray's theme from the cartoon series Fat Albert and the Cosby Kids "Gonna Have a Good Time", the electric piano riff from "Lucky Man" by Steve Miller Band, a guitar swell from "You Should Be High Love" by Billy Squier, and the drum beats from "What'd I Say" by Rare Earth, "Joe Bell" by Isaac Hayes, and "Running Back To Me" by Ruby.

In a 2021 interview with the website WhoSampled, Yarbrough said that she liked "Praise You" and its use of her vocals, feeling that Norman Cook (aka Fatboy Slim) kept the essence of "Take Yo' Praise".

== Music video ==
The video for "Praise You" was directed by Spike Jonze with Roman Coppola. Jonze starred under the pseudonym Richard Koufey, along with the fictional Torrance Community Dance Group. The video intro described it as "A Torrance Public Film Production".

The video was shot guerrilla-style — on location without obtaining permission from the owners of the property—in front of puzzled onlookers outside the Fox Bruin Theater in Westwood, Los Angeles, California. In the video, a heavily disguised Jonze and the dance group, acting as a flash mob, dance to "Praise You", much to the chagrin of a theatre employee who turns off their portable stereo. One of the actor-dancers in the fictional dance group, Michael Gier, documented the making of the "Praise You" video on his website.

The "Praise You" video was made only because Jonze, unable to work with Fatboy Slim on the video for "The Rockafeller Skank", recorded and sent his own solo dance video of "Skank" as a gift. Jonze's 'alternative' music video was so well received by Cook that Jonze's fictional Torrance Community Dance Group was green-lighted for the video for "Praise You". Cook said he liked this music video more than the one for "The Rockafeller Skank", which he hated.

Cook is briefly seen in the video as one of the many onlookers, with the clearest view shown at the conclusion of the video, while Jonze claims his "b-boy moves" came from living in New York City. Cook curiously peers over Jonze to catch a glimpse of the camera before walking off to the right.

The video reportedly cost only US$800 to produce.

The video won three major awards at the 1999 MTV Video Music Awards: Breakthrough Video, Best Direction (awarded to "Torrance Community Dance Group"), and Best Choreography (awarded to "Richard Koufey & Michael Rooney"). It was also nominated for, but did not win, Best Dance Video. The group also put on a dance performance to the song at the awards. In 2001, it was voted number one of the 100 best videos of all time, in a poll to mark the 20th anniversary of MTV.

Year	Nominee / work	Award	Result
1999	MTV Video Music Award	Best Dance Video	Nominated
1999	MTV Video Music Award	Breakthrough Video	Won
1999	MTV Video Music Award	Best Direction	Won
1999	MTV Video Music Award	Best Choreography	Won
1999	MTV Europe Music Award	Best Video	Nominated
2000	Grammy Award	Best Dance Recording	Nominated

== Track listings ==
UK and Australian CD single

1. "Praise You" (radio edit)
2. "Praise You"
3. "Sho Nuff"
4. "The Rockafeller Skank" (Mulder's Urban Takeover remix)

UK 12-inch single

A. "Praise You"
AA. "Sho Nuff"

UK cassette single

1. "Praise You" (radio edit)
2. "The Rockafeller Skank" (Mulder's Urban Takeover remix)

European CD single

1. "Praise You" (radio edit)
2. "Praise You" (full version)

US CD, 12-inch, and cassette single

1. "Praise You"
2. "Sho Nuff"
3. "The Rockafeller Skank" (Mulder's Urban Takeover remix)

Japanese CD single

1. "Praise You" (full version)
2. "Sho Nuff"
3. "The Rockafeller Skank" (Mulder's Urban Takeover remix)
4. "Praise You" (radio edit)
5. "How Can You Hear Us?"

== Personnel ==
Personnel are sourced from Sound on Sound and Muso.ai

- Fatboy Slim – Studio Electronics SE-1 and Roland TB-303 synthesizers, Akai S950 samplers, Atari ST programming
- Camille Yarbrough – sampled lead vocals
- Brad Smalling – immersive mixing engineering, immersive mastering engineering

== Charts ==
=== Weekly charts ===
Chart (1999)	Peak position
Australia (ARIA)	28
Austria (Ö3 Austria Top 40)	31
Belgium (Ultratip Bubbling Under Flanders)	2
Canada Top Singles (RPM)	4
Canada Adult Contemporary (RPM)	39
Canada Dance/Urban (RPM)	9
Canada Rock/Alternative (RPM)	15
Europe (Eurochart Hot 100)	8
Germany (GfK)	55
Hungary (Mahasz)	10
Iceland (Íslenski Listinn Topp 40)	1
Ireland (IRMA)	6
Italy Airplay (Music & Media)	7
Netherlands (Dutch Top 40)	32
Netherlands (Single Top 100)	46
New Zealand (Recorded Music NZ)	11
Poland Airplay (Music & Media)	5
Scottish Singles Sales (Official Charts)	1
Sweden (Sverigetopplistan)	32
Switzerland (Schweizer Hitparade)	44
UK Singles (Official Charts)	1
UK Dance (Official Charts)	1
UK Independent (Official Charts)	1
US Billboard Hot 100	36
US Adult Pop Airplay (Billboard)	19
US Alternative Airplay (Billboard)	2
US Dance Singles Sales (Billboard)	5
US Pop Airplay (Billboard)	22

Chart (2019)	Peak position
US Dance Club Songs (Billboard)	1

=== Year-end charts ===
Chart (1999)	Position
Canada Top Singles (RPM)	30
UK Singles (OCC)	69
UK Airplay (Music Week)	22
US Adult Top 40 (Billboard)	53
US Mainstream Top 40 (Billboard)	97
US Maxi-Singles Sales (Billboard)	9
US Modern Rock Tracks (Billboard)	10

Chart (2019)	Position
US Dance Club Songs (Billboard)	30

== Certifications ==
Region	Certification	Certified units/sales
Brazil (Pro-Música Brasil)	Gold	30,000^{*}
Italy (FIMI)	Gold	35,000^{‡}
New Zealand (RMNZ)	3× Platinum	90,000^{‡}
United Kingdom (BPI)	2× Platinum	1,200,000^{‡}
^{*} Sales figures based on certification alone.^{‡} Sales+streaming figures based on certification alone.

== Release history ==
Region	Date	Format(s)	Label(s)	Ref.
United Kingdom	4 January 1999	12-inch vinyl; CD; cassette	Skint	
Japan	20 February 1999	CD	Skint	
United States	23 February 1999	12-inch vinyl; CD; cassette	Astralwerks	
United States	9 March 1999	Contemporary hit radio	Astralwerks	

== Other versions ==
- In 2017, Hannah Grace and the London Contemporary Voices Choir recorded a version of the song for a Lloyds Bank advertising campaign. Grace’s version includes an extra refrain which includes lyrics from Camille Yarborough's original song.
- In 2018, a remix by Purple Disco Machine was released, which made it to number one on the US Billboard Dance Club Songs chart.
- In 2023, British singer Rita Ora released a re-worked version of the song, titled "Praising You", featuring Fatboy Slim for her album You & I, which later became an international hit after it was used in the film Ruby Gillman, Teenage Kraken.

== In media and pop culture ==
- In November 2017, an American TV advertisement for Forevermark Diamonds featured a cover of the Hannah Grace version, sung by Jon Kenzie.
- Meal delivery service Grubhub used an instrumental version of the song in a 2020 animated TV commercial.
- In 2020, a TV commercial for Advil features Grace's version.

== See also ==
- List of Billboard number-one dance songs of 2019
