= Rita Ora discography =

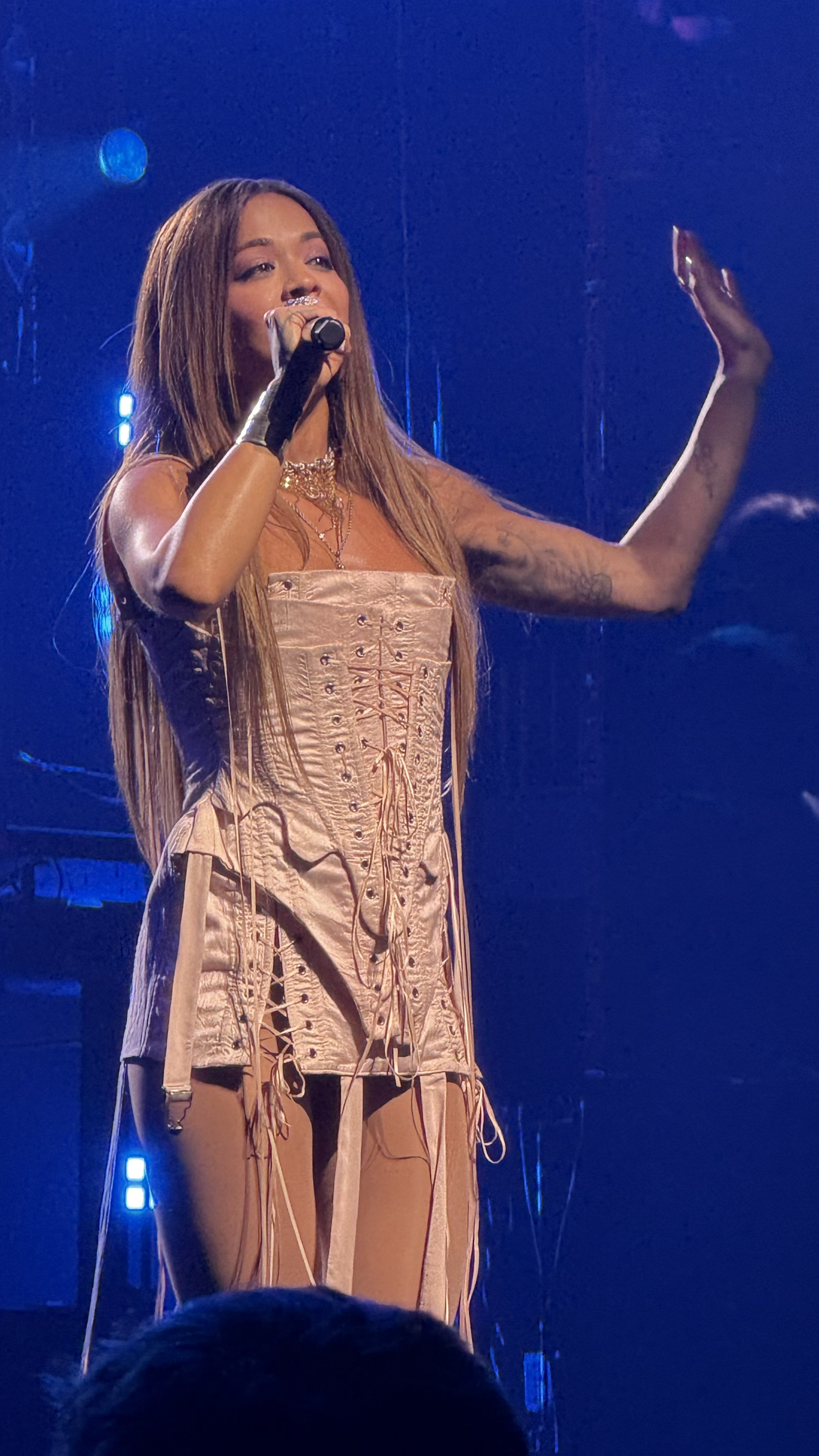
- Ora performing in 2025
- Studio albums: 3
- Extended plays: 2
- Singles: 31
- Featured singles: 8
- Promotional singles: 10

English singer and songwriter Rita Ora has released three studio albums, two extended plays, 31 singles (including eight as a featured artist) and ten promotional singles. Ora signed a record deal with Roc Nation in 2008. She featured on DJ Fresh's single, "Hot Right Now", in February 2012, which reached number one in the United Kingdom. Her debut studio album, Ora, was released in August 2012. The album debuted at number one on the UK Albums Chart and was subsequently certified platinum by the British Phonographic Industry (BPI). Ora spawned four singles; the first two, "How We Do (Party)" and "R.I.P.", both reached number one on the UK Singles Chart, while "Shine Ya Light" and "Radioactive" reached numbers ten and eighteen in the United Kingdom, respectively.

Ora's second studio album, Phoenix, was released by Atlantic Records in November 2018. The album peaked at number eleven on the UK Albums Chart and was later certified platinum in the United Kingdom. Elsewhere, it entered the album charts, among others, in Australia, Canada, Germany, Netherlands and the United States. Five singles preceded the record, including "Your Song", "Anywhere", "For You" and "Let You Love Me", with four of them reaching the top 10 on the UK Singles Chart. "Let You Love Me" became Ora's thirteenth top 10 song in the United Kingdom, a record for a British female solo artist at the time. Four of those songs topped the UK Singles Chart. In February 2021, Ora released the collaborative extended play, Bang, with Kazakh producer Imanbek, which included songs such as "Big" and "Bang Bang". In February 2022, Ora signed a record deal with Berlin-based independent music label, BMG. Ora's third studio album, You & I, was released in July 2023 and debuted at number six in the UK.

In 2025, Ora discussed her fourth studio album, although she did not reveal the title, and released the singles "Heat" and "All Natural".

== Albums ==
List of studio albums, with selected chart positions and certifications
Title	Album details	Peak chart positions										Certifications
Title	Album details	UK	AUS	AUT	BEL (FL)	GER	IRL	NLD	NZ	SWI	US	Certifications
Ora	Released: 27 August 2012; Label: Roc Nation, Columbia; Formats: CD, digital download, streaming	1	24	51	101	63	2	—	24	15	—	BPI: Platinum; RMNZ: Gold
Phoenix	Released: 23 November 2018; Label: Atlantic; Formats: CD, LP, digital download, streaming	11	15	43	31	13	19	30	18	18	79	BPI: Platinum; NVPI: Gold; RMNZ: Platinum
You & I	Released: 14 July 2023; Label: BMG; Formats: CD, LP, digital download, streaming	6	—	45	53	19	—	—	—	25	—	
"—" denotes a recording that did not chart or was not released in that territory.

== Extended plays ==
List of extended plays, with selected chart positions
Title	Details	Peak chart positions
Title	Details	US Dance
Spotify Sessions	Released: 23 September 2012; Label: Roc Nation, Columbia; Formats: Streaming	—
Bang (with Imanbek)	Released: 12 February 2021; Label: Atlantic, Warner; Formats: Digital download, streaming	16
"—" denotes a recording that did not chart or was not released in that territory.

== Singles ==
=== As lead artist ===
List of singles as lead artist, showing year released, with selected chart positions, certifications and album name
Title	Year	Peak chart positions										Certifications	Album
Title	Year	UK	AUS	AUT	BEL (FL)	GER	IRL	NLD	NZ	SWI	US	Certifications	Album
"How We Do (Party)"	2012	1	9	35	— (Note: "How We Do (Party)" did not enter the Ultratop 50, but peaked at number eighteen on the Flemish Ultratip chart.)	40	1	31	5	41	62	BPI: Platinum; ARIA: 2× Platinum; RMNZ: Gold	Ora
"R.I.P." (featuring Tinie Tempah)	2012	1	10	51	44	36	11	89	28	46	— (Note: "R.I.P." did not enter the Billboard Hot 100, but peaked at number three on the Bubbling Under Hot 100 ranking.)	BPI: Platinum; ARIA: Platinum; RMNZ: Gold	Ora
"Shine Ya Light"	2012	10	—	—	—	—	25	—	—	—	—	BPI: Silver	Ora
"Radioactive"	2013	18	23	—	— (Note: "Radioactive" did not enter the Ultratop 50, but peaked at number twenty on the Flemish Ultratip chart.)	—	30	—	—	—	—	BPI: Silver; ARIA: Gold	Ora
"I Will Never Let You Down"	2014	1	5	15	— (Note: "I Will Never Let You Down" did not enter the Ultratop 50, but peaked at number twelve on the Flemish Ultratip chart.)	23	9	—	9	12	77	BPI: 2× Platinum; ARIA: Platinum; BVMI: Gold; RMNZ: Platinum	Non-album singles
"Poison"	2015	3	30	—	— (Note: "Poison" did not enter the Ultratop 50, but peaked at number forty-five on the Flemish Ultratip chart.)	—	18	—	—	—	—	BPI: Platinum; ARIA: Gold; RMNZ: Gold	Non-album singles
"Body on Me" (featuring Chris Brown)	2015	22	66	—	— (Note: "Body on Me" did not enter the Ultratop 50, but peaked at number fifty-five on the Flemish Ultratip chart.)	—	54	—	— (Note: "Body on Me" did not enter the NZ Top 40 Singles chart, but peaked at number six on the NZ Heatseeker Singles ranking.)	—	— (Note: "Body on Me" did not enter the Billboard Hot 100, but peaked at number two on the Bubbling Under Hot 100 ranking.)	BPI: Gold; RMNZ: 2× Platinum	Non-album singles
"Coming Home" (with Sigma)	2015	15	97	—	13	—	54	—	—	—	—	BPI: Platinum; RMNZ: Gold	Life
"Your Song"	2017	7	12	10	6	13	8	28	16	13	— (Note: "Your Song" did not enter the Billboard Hot 100, but peaked at number 23 on the Bubbling Under Hot 100 ranking.)	BPI: 2× Platinum; ARIA: 5× Platinum; BEA: Platinum; BVMI: 3× Gold; IFPI AUT: Gold; IFPI SWI: Platinum; NVPI: Platinum; RIAA: Gold; RMNZ: 3× Platinum	Phoenix
"Anywhere"	2017	2	14	18	17	18	4	20	23	7	—	BPI: 2× Platinum; ARIA: 3× Platinum; BEA: Gold; BVMI: Gold; IFPI AUT: Gold; IFPI SWI: Platinum; NVPI: Platinum; RMNZ: 2× Platinum	Phoenix
"For You" (with Liam Payne)	2018	8	15	4	8	1	17	35	34	3	76	BPI: Platinum; ARIA: 2× Platinum; BEA: Gold; BVMI: Platinum; IFPI AUT: Gold; RMNZ: Platinum	Phoenix
"Girls" (featuring Cardi B, Bebe Rexha and Charli XCX)	2018	22	52	62	— (Note: "Girls" did not enter the Ultratop 50, but peaked at number thirty-three on the Flemish Ultratip chart.)	69	26	73	— (Note: "Girls" did not enter the NZ Top 40 Singles chart, but peaked at number one on the NZ Heatseeker Singles ranking.)	54	— (Note: "Girls" did not enter the Billboard Hot 100, but peaked at number three on the Bubbling Under Hot 100 ranking.)	BPI: Gold; ARIA: Gold; RMNZ: Gold	Phoenix
"Let You Love Me"	2018	4	8	16	8	12	4	14	19	11	—	BPI: 2× Platinum; ARIA: 4× Platinum; BEA: Gold; BVMI: Gold; IFPI AUT: Gold; IFPI SWI: Gold; NVPI: Platinum; RIAA: Gold; RMNZ: 2× Platinum	Phoenix
"Only Want You" (solo or featuring 6lack)	2019	60	—	—	—	—	59	—	— (Note: "Only Want You" did not enter the NZ Top 40 Singles chart, but peaked at number 10 on the NZ Hot 40 Singles chart.)	—	—	BPI: Silver; RMNZ: Gold	Phoenix
"Carry On" (with Kygo)	2019	26	43	47	40	46	15	35	— (Note: "Carry On" did not enter the NZ Top 40 Singles chart, but peaked at number six on the NZ Hot 40 Singles ranking.)	28	—	BPI: Gold; ARIA: Gold; IFPI SWI: Gold; RMNZ: Gold	Golden Hour
"Ritual" (with Tiësto and Jonas Blue)	2019	24	—	—	10	—	13	11	— (Note: "Ritual" did not enter the NZ Top 40 Singles chart, but peaked at number 10 on the NZ Hot 40 Singles ranking.)	56	—	BPI: Platinum; BEA: Gold; RMNZ: Gold	The London Sessions
"How to Be Lonely"	2020	57	—	—	—	—	96	—	— (Note: "How to Be Lonely" did not enter the NZ Top 40 Singles chart, but peaked at number 19 on the NZ Hot 40 Singles ranking.)	—	—		Non-album single
"Big" (with Imanbek and David Guetta featuring Gunna)	2021	53	—	—	—	95	53	—	— (Note: "Big" did not enter the NZ Top 40 Singles chart, but peaked at number 16 on the NZ Hot 40 Singles ranking.)	68	—		Bang
"You for Me" (with Sigala)	2021	23	—	—	—	—	23	—	— (Note: "You for Me" did not enter the NZ Top 40 Singles chart, but peaked at number 13 on the NZ Hot 40 Singles ranking.)	—	—	BPI: Gold	Every Cloud
"Follow Me" (with Sam Feldt)	2021	—	—	—	—	—	—	66	— (Note: "Follow Me" did not enter the NZ Top 40 Singles chart, but peaked at number 16 on the NZ Hot 40 Singles ranking.)	—	—		Non-album single
"You Only Love Me"	2023	57	—	—	50	—	42	— (Note: "You Only Love Me" did not enter the Dutch Single Top 100, but peaked at number one on the Single Tip chart.)	— (Note: "You Only Love Me" did not enter the NZ Top 40 Singles Chart, but peaked at number three on the NZ Hot Singles Chart.)	—	—		You & I
"Praising You" (featuring Fatboy Slim)	2023	— (Note: "Praising You" did not enter the UK Singles Chart, but peaked at number 13 on the UK Singles Downloads Chart.)	—	—	—	—	—	—	— (Note: "Praising You" did not enter the NZ Top 40 Singles Chart, but peaked at number 15 on the NZ Hot Singles Chart.)	—	—		You & I
"Don't Think Twice"	2023	— (Note: "Don't Think Twice" did not enter the UK Singles Chart, but peaked at number 27 on the UK Singles Downloads Chart.)	—	—	—	—	—	—	—	—	—		You & I
"Drinkin'" (with Joel Corry and MK)	2023	44	—	—	—	—	—	—	— (Note: "Drinkin'" did not enter the NZ Top 40 Singles Chart, but peaked at number 39 on the NZ Hot Singles Chart.)	—	—		Another Friday Night
"I'll Be There" (with Robin Schulz and Tiago PZK)	2023	—	—	—	28	52	—	— (Note: "I'll Be There" did not enter the Single Top 100, but peaked at number 27 on the Single Tip chart.)	—	—	—		Non-album single
"Shape of Me" (solo or featuring Keith Urban)	2024	—	—	—	—	—	—	—	—	—	—		You & I
"Ask & You Shall Receive"	2024	— (Note: "Ask & You Shall Receive" did not enter the UK Singles Chart, but peaked at number 43 on the UK Singles Downloads Chart.)	—	—	—	—	—	—	—	—	—		Non-album singles
"Heat"	2025	—	—	—	—	—	—	—	—	—	—		Non-album singles
"Joy"	2025	—	—	—	—	—	—	—	—	—	—		Non-album singles
"All Natural"	2025	—	—	—	—	—	—	—	—	—	—		Non-album singles
"If It’s Not Love" (with Zerb)	2026	—	—	—	—	—	—	—	—	—	—		Non-album singles
"The Current"	2026	—	—	—	—	—	—	—	—	—	—		From ViQueens (Original Motion Picture Soundtrack)
"—" denotes a recording that did not chart or was not released in that dominion.

=== As featured artist ===
List of singles as featured artist, showing year released, with selected chart positions, certifications and album name
Title	Year	Peak chart positions										Certifications	Album
Title	Year	UK	AUS	AUT	BEL (FL)	GER	IRL	NLD	NZ	SWI	US	Certifications	Album
"Hot Right Now" (DJ Fresh featuring Rita Ora)	2012	1	46	24	11	28	17	22	—	39	—	BPI: Platinum; RMNZ: Gold	Nextlevelism and Ora
"Lay Down Your Weapons" (K Koke featuring Rita Ora)	2013	18	—	—	—	—	—	—	—	—	—		I Ain't Perfect
"Black Widow" (Iggy Azalea featuring Rita Ora)	2014	4	15	25	12	39	9	13	11	28	3	BPI: Platinum; ARIA: Platinum; BVMI: Gold; RIAA: 5× Platinum; RMNZ: Platinum	The New Classic
"Doing It" (Charli XCX featuring Rita Ora)	2015	8	68	—	—	—	23	—	—	—	—	BPI: Silver	Sucker
"New York Raining" (Charles Hamilton featuring Rita Ora)	2015	29	—	—	—	—	—	—	—	—	—		Empire
"Bridge over Troubled Water" (Note: Released to raise money for victims of the Grenfell Tower fire.) (as part of Artists for Grenfell)	2017	1	53	32	—	—	25	—	—	28	—	BPI: Gold	Non-album single
"Lonely Together" (Avicii featuring Rita Ora)	2017	4	32	18	36	24	5	22	34	22	— (Note: "Lonely Together" did not enter the Billboard Hot 100, but peaked at number 18 on the Bubbling Under Hot 100 ranking.)	BPI: 2× Platinum; BRMA: Gold; BVMI: Platinum; RIAA: Platinum; RMNZ: 2× Platinum	Avīci (01) and Phoenix
"R.I.P." (Sofía Reyes featuring Rita Ora and Anitta)	2019	—	—	—	—	—	69	—	— (Note: "R.I.P." did not enter the NZ Top 40 Singles Chart, but peaked at number seven on the NZ Hot Singles Chart.)	56	—	RIAA: Platinum (Latin)	Mal de Amores
"Times Like These" (Note: Produced by BBC Radio 1 and released to aid international relief for the COVID-19 pandemic.) (as part of Live Lounge Allstars)	2020	1	—	—	—	—	64	—	—	—	—	BPI: Silver	Non-album single
"Last of Us" (Gryffin featuring Rita Ora)	2024	—	—	—	—	—	—	—	—	—	—		Pulse
"Higher" (Lance Savali featuring Rita Ora)	2026	—	—	—	—	—	—	—	— (Note: "Higher" did not enter the NZ Top 40 Singles Chart, but peaked at number 29 on the NZ Hot Singles Chart.)	—	—		Non-album single
"—" denotes a recording that did not chart or was not released in that territory.

=== Promotional singles ===
List of promotional singles, showing year released, with selected chart positions and album name
Title	Year	Peak chart positions						Album
Title	Year	UK DL	BEL (FL)	CIS	NZ Hot	POL	RUS	Album
"Roc the Life"	2012	—	—	—	—	—	—	Ora
"Grateful"	2014	—	—	—	—	—	—	Beyond The Lights
"Velvet Rope"	2018	—	—	—	—	—	—	Phoenix
"Cashmere"	2018	—	—	—	—	—	—	Phoenix
"Falling to Pieces"	2018	—	—	—	—	—	—	Phoenix
"New Look"	2019	—	—	—	—	—	—	Phoenix
"Bang Bang" (with Imanbek)	2021	27	—	13	6	16	8	Bang
"Seaside" (with Diane Warren, Sofía Reyes and Reik)	2021	76	—	—	—	—	—	Diane Warren: The Cave Sessions Vol. 1
"Finish Line"	2022	—	—	—	—	—	—	Non-album promotional singles
"Barricades" (with Netsky)	2022	—	44	—	29	—	—	Non-album promotional singles
"Look at Me Now" (Atlantis Remix)	2023	—	—	—	—	—	—	You & I
"—" denotes a recording that did not chart or was not released in that territory.

== Other charted songs ==
List of other charted songs, showing year released, with selected chart positions and album name
Title	Year	Peak chart positions				Album
Title	Year	UK	BEL (FL)	NZ Hot	US Dance	Album
"Better than You" (Conor Maynard featuring Rita Ora)	2012	105	—	—	—	Contrast
"Love and War"	2012	193	—	—	—	Ora
"Young, Single & Sexy"	2012	54	—	—	—	Ora
"Torn Apart" (Snoop Lion featuring Rita Ora)	2013	—	44	—	—	Reincarnated
"Summer Love" (with Rudimental)	2018	—	—	9	48	Phoenix
"You & I"	2023	— (Note: "You & I" did not enter the UK Singles Chart, but peaked at number 96 on the UK Singles Downloads Chart.)	—	—	—	You & I
"—" denotes a recording that did not chart or was not released in that territory.

== Guest appearances ==
List of other appearances, showing year released, other artist(s) credited and album name
Title	Year	Other artist(s)	Album
"Awkward"	2007	Craig David	Trust Me
"Where's Your Love"	2008	Craig David and Tinchy Stryder	Greatest Hits
"Ain't About 2 Stop"	2015	Prince	Hit n Run Phase One
"Santa Claus Is Coming To Town"	2016	DNCE (featuring Charlie Puth, Hailee Steinfeld, Daya, Fifth Harmony, Tinashe, Sabrina Carpenter, Jake Miller)	Non-album single
"Nowhere"	2018	Clean Bandit and Kyle	What Is Love?
"Love Ain't It"	2024	Kylie Cantrall, Brandy and Malia Baker	Descendants: The Rise of Red
"Life Is Sweeter (Reprise)"	2024	Kylie Cantrall	Descendants: The Rise of Red
"Life Is Sweeter (Remix)"	2024	Descendants – Cast	Descendants: The Rise of Red
"Love Ain't It (Halloween Remix)"	2024	Kylie Cantrall, Brandy and Malia Baker	Descendants: The Rise of Red – Halloween EP
"Mad"	2026	Leonardo Nam	Descendants: Wicked Wonderland
"The Girl I Used to Be"	2026	Brandy	Descendants: Wicked Wonderland
