= List of The Tonight Show Starring Jimmy Fallon episodes (2021) =

- No. of episodes: 195

Release
- Original network: NBC
- Original release: January 4 – December 17, 2021

Season chronology
- ← Previous; 2020 episodes Next → 2022 episodes

This is the list of episodes for The Tonight Show Starring Jimmy Fallon in 2021.

== 2021 ==
=== January ===
No.	Original release date	Guest(s)	Musical/entertainment guest(s)
1379A	January 4, 2021	Gordon Ramsay, Vanessa Kirby	Sturgill Simpson
Donald Trump Audio (Jimmy portrays Trump); Congressman/woman Quotes; Tonight Show News & Improved; Jimmy portrays Harry Styles in behind the scenes of "Treat People with Kindness" music video with an appearance by Phoebe Waller-Bridge (portrayed by Chloe Fineman); Sturgill Simpson performed "Life of Sin"
1380A	January 5, 2021	Gwen Stefani, Ralph Macchio	Gwen Stefani
Tariq and Jimmy talk about Mike Pence; Tonight Show Screengrabs; Tonight Show 50 Yes or No's (Gwen Stefani); The Final Word: Cobra Kai Edition (Ralph Macchio); Gwen Stefani performed "Let Me Reintroduce Myself"
1381A	January 6, 2021	Dan Rather, Don Cheadle, Katy Tur	Michael Kiwanuka
Jimmy acknowledges the 2021 storming of the United States Capitol at the top of the program before cutting to his interview with Dan Rather; Michael Kiwanuka performed "You Ain't the Problem"
1382A	January 7, 2021	Ricky Gervais, Daisy Edgar-Jones	The Avett Brothers
Tonight Show #hashtags: #WorstFirstDate; Ricky Gervais brings his new cat out during the interview; Tonight Show Wheel of Opinions (Ricky Gervais); The Avett Brothers performed "I Go to My Heart"
1383A	January 8, 2021	Rob Lowe, Lil Nas X, Regé-Jean Page	Mark Normand
Thank You Notes
1384A	January 11, 2021	Rashida Jones, Bill Burr	Old Dominion
Tonight Show Go On, Git!; Tonight Show Life Coach (Bill Burr); Old Dominion performed "Never Be Sorry"
1385A	January 12, 2021	Anne Hathaway, Lilly Singh	Jazmine Sullivan
Tariq makes fun of comedy sketch; Tonight Show Best Worst First (Anne Hathaway); Jazmine Sullivan performed "Girl Like Me"
1386A	January 13, 2021	Riz Ahmed, Angela Bassett	Jacob Collier featuring Mahalia
Tonight Show Picture This; Freestylin' with The Roots; Jacob Collier featuring Mahalia performed "All I Need"
1387A	January 14, 2021	Anthony Mackie, Cristin Milioti	Rico Nasty
Simply the Best; Tonight Show #hashtags: #DescribeATVShowBadly; Hey Robot... (Anthony Mackie); Rico Nasty performed "OHFR?"
1388A	January 15, 2021	Nicole Kidman, Cole Sprouse	Henry Hall
Jimmy and The Roots performed "Drivers License" as a sea shanty; Thank You Notes; Tonight Show 50 Yes or No's (Nicole Kidman); Henry Hall performed "Alive, Annoyed"
1389A	January 18, 2021	Alex Rodriguez, Spike Lee	Jimmy Jam and Terry Lewis featuring Babyface
Tariq's segment has been cut (Tariq and Jimmy performed "Just Once"). Note: All previous entries used this song; mistakenly put as an original song; Tonight Show Do Not Play; Tonight Show Singing Whisper Challenge (Alex Rodriguez); Jimmy Jam and Terry Lewis featuring Babyface performed "He Don't Know Nothin' Bout It"
1390A	January 19, 2021	Dakota Johnson, Yara Shahidi	Tate McRae
Tonight Show Tariq's Irk List; Dakota Settles It (Dakota Johnson); Tate McRae performed "You Broke Me First"
1391A	January 20, 2021	Martin Scorsese & Fran Lebowitz, Pete Buttigieg, Hunter Schafer	Playboi Carti
Tonight Show News & Improved; Playboi Carti performed "Slayer"
1392A	January 21, 2021	Shaquille O'Neal, Alison Brie	Pa Salieu
Normal Tweet; Tariq has buyers' remorse on a face tattoo; Lubalin performed "Turning Random Internet Drama into Songs Part 4" (appearance by Alison Brie); Tonight Show #hashtags: #MyWorstCar; Tonight Show Guess the Impression (Shaquille O'Neal); Pa Salieu performed "Frontline"
1393A	January 22, 2021	Rosario Dawson, Daveed Diggs	Amanda Shires featuring Jason Isbell
No Time to Die Title Changes; Tariq has buyers' remorse on a face tattoo; Captain Kirk Douglas debuts his own Gibson SG guitar; Tonight Show Fast Stats; Thank You Notes; Know Your Better Half (Rosario Dawson, Senator Cory Booker); Amanda Shires featuring Jason Isbell performed "The Problem"
1394A	January 25, 2021	Jared Leto, Jane Lynch	Jade Bird
Uhh... I Have Some Questions; Tariq has a problem with historically inaccurate TV series; Jimmy cleans up Steve Kornacki's office; Tonight Show Battle of the Instant Songwriters; Tonight Show 30 Seconds to... Rematch (Jared Leto); Jade Bird performed "Headstart"
1395A	January 26, 2021	Susan Sarandon, J. J. Watt	Thad Cockrell
Jimmy does Zoom interview with Vanity Fair; Tonight Show Good Name Bad Name Great Name; Tonight Show Show Me Something Good; Thad Cockrell performed "Swingin'"
1396A	January 27, 2021	Rami Malek, Bridget Everett	Jesus Trejo
Tonight Show Polls; Tonight Show Audience Suggestion Box (scene from The Bachelor revoiced with Siri, Jimmy asks the camera questions, Bridgerton theme song with lyrics, Jimmy does an advertisement, Jimmy walks through a TV portal to The Drew Barrymore Show (appearance by Drew Barrymore); Bridget Everett performed "I Can See Clearly Now"
1397A	January 28, 2021	Keegan-Michael Key, Terry Gross	Fontaines D.C.
Tonight Show News Smash; Jimmy performed a song about Joe Biden; Tonight Show #hashtags: #MyWorstInvention; Fontaines D.C. performed "A Hero's Death"
1398A	January 29, 2021	Justin Timberlake, London Hughes	Ozuna & Anuel AA
Jimmy encourages people to wear double face masks; Jimmy calls out police officers in Paris who held a party during lockdown with 90s song titles; Thank You Notes; Ozuna & Anuel AA performed "Antes"

=== February ===
No.	Original release date	Guest(s)	Musical/entertainment guest(s)
1399A	February 1, 2021	Bryan Cranston, John Cena	Remi Wolf
Jimmy shows the aftermath of the nor'easter outside of the building at the top of the program; Jimmy pays tribute to Ben Affleck's love of Dunkin' Donuts; Jimmy talks about a meeting with Nike, Inc.; Fancy Soaps (Bryan Cranston); Tonight Show Think Fast! (John Cena); Remi Wolf performed "Hello Hello Hello/Photo ID"
1400A	February 2, 2021	Drew Barrymore, Talib Kweli	Nilüfer Yanya
Tonight Show Let's Get Siri–ous; Tonight Show Mad Lib Theater (Drew Barrymore); Nilüfer Yanya performed "Crash"
1401A	February 3, 2021	Kelly Ripa, JoJo Siwa, M. Night Shyamalan	N/A
Dance Battle (JoJo Siwa); Know Your Show Challenge (Kelly Ripa); debut of first footage from Old
1402A	February 4, 2021	Mike Myers & Dana Carvey, Camila Mendes	Olivia Rodrigo
Tonight Show Superlatives; Tonight Show #hashtags: #ImTheGOATOf; Tonight Show Dip Off (Tariq & Jimmy Fallon); Olivia Rodrigo performed "Drivers License"
1403A	February 5, 2021	Dolly Parton, Noah Centineo	slowthai featuring Skepta
Puppy Predictors: Super Bowl LV Edition; Tonight Show True Confessions (Dolly Parton, Noah Centineo); slowthai featuring Skepta performed "Canceled"
1404A	February 8, 2021	Dave Grohl, Joel Kinnaman	Foo Fighters
Tariq swaps out himself with a cardboard cutout for the monologue; Tonight Show News & Improved; Foo Fighters performed "Waiting on a War"
1405A	February 9, 2021	Priyanka Chopra-Jonas, LaKeith Stanfield, Rob Gronkowski	Joy Oladokun
Tonight Show One Word Songs (Priyanka Chopra-Jonas); Joy Oladokun performed "Breathe Again"
1406A	February 10, 2021	Dwayne Johnson, Daniel Kaluuya	Chris Stapleton
Tariq correctly guesses the title of Michelle Obama's new Netflix series; Greatest Moments in Zoom History; Jimmy performed an original song about Hi-C at McDonald's; Tonight Show Go On, Git!; Dwayne Johnson's mother makes an appearance during the interview; Bradley Constant participates in the Dwayne Johnson interview; Chris Stapleton performed "When I'm with You"
1407A	February 11, 2021	Cardi B, Alex Moffat	Lang Lang
Valentine's Day Cards; Tonight Show #hashtags: #AddAWordRuinALoveSong; Tonight Show Mimic Challenge (Cardi B); Lang Lang performed a medley of songs
1408A	February 12, 2021	Kenan Thompson, Lana Condor	Fireboy DML
Nicolas Cage/John Travolta Recording; The Real Bruno Mars; Jimmy performed an original song about Valentine's Day gifts; Thank You Notes; Tonight Show 5–Second Summaries (Kenan Thompson); Fireboy DML performed "Champion/Vibration"
1409A	February 22, 2021	Shailene Woodley, Henry Louis Gates Jr.	Kenice Mobley
Tonight Show Podcasts; Tonight Show Do Not Read
1410A	February 23, 2021	Tom Holland, Andra Day	Andra Day
Tonight Show Let's Get Siri–ous; Bruce Springsteen and Bob Dylan impromptu interview during the monologue (Jimmy portrays Springsteen and Dylan); Tonight Show Bad Signs; Tonight Show Instant Spoilers (Tom Holland); Andra Day performed "Strange Fruit/Tigress & Tweed"
1411A	February 24, 2021	Awkwafina, Ava DuVernay, Mary McCartney	Chloe x Halle
Jimmy portrays Joe Biden in audio of bilateral meeting; Jimmy announces non-dairy and cookie dough chunk versions of his Ben & Jerry's ice cream; Tonight Show Show Me Something Good; Chloe x Halle performed "Ungodly Hour"
1412A	February 25, 2021	Eddie Murphy, Eve Hewson	The Kid LAROI
Tariq criticizes and guesses Jimmy's monologue joke; Eddie Murphy recounts memories of people he's met; The Kid LAROI performed "Without You"
1413A	February 26, 2021	Queen Latifah, Paris Hilton	The Network
Greatest Moments in Zoom History; Thank You Notes; The Network performed "Threat Level Midnight"

=== March ===
No.	Original release date	Guest(s)	Musical/entertainment guest(s)
1414A	March 1, 2021	John Legend, Jermaine Fowler	Arlo Parks
Jimmy looks back on one year of quarantine (parody of "Belle", appearance by John Legend); Tonight Show Can It Be Ballad–ed (John Legend); Arlo Parks performed "Black Dog"
1415A	March 2, 2021	Nick Jonas, Rita Ora	Rita Ora
Pickup Lines; Tonight Show News & Improved; Freestylin' with The Roots; Tonight Show Singing Whisper Challenge (Nick Jonas); Rita Ora performed "Bang Bang"
1416A	March 3, 2021	Leslie Jones, Elizabeth Olsen	Nicky Jam & Romeo Santos
Cereal Mashups; Jimmy carries on a conversation with Tariq; What Are You Doing Wednesday; FallonVision (Elizabeth Olsen, Kathryn Hahn); Nicky Jam & Romeo Santos performed "Fan de Tus Fotos"
1417A	March 4, 2021	Tracy Morgan, Sam Heughan	Pete Lee
What Members of the House Did on Their Day Off; Jimmy performed an ode to dollar stores; Tonight Show #hashtags: #RealLifePlotTwist; Tonight Show Box of Lies (Tracy Morgan)
1418A	March 5, 2021	Amanda Seyfried, Omar Sy	Lil Durk featuring 6lack
Jimmy portrays Joe Biden in footage of a meeting with the House; Tonight Show TikTok Tributes; Thank You Notes; One Word Songs (Amanda Seyfried); Lil Durk featuring 6lack performed "Still Trappin'/Stay Down"
1419A	March 8, 2021	Amy Poehler, Courtney B. Vance	Willie Jones
British royal family Phone Call; Tonight Show Film Fest; Tonight Show Do Not Play; Tonight Show Instant Spoilers (Amy Poehler); Willie Jones performed "American Dream"
1420A	March 9, 2021	Chrissy Teigen, Rory McIlroy	Pink Sweat$ featuring Kehlani
News Radio; Tonight Show Film Fest; Tonight Show Rap Remix; Jimmy tries Chrissy Teigen's products from Cravings by Chrissy Teigen; Tonight Show Best Worst First (Chrissy Teigen); Pink Sweat$ featuring Kehlani performed "At My Worst"
1421A	March 10, 2021	Norman Reedus, Charli & Dixie D'Amelio	Mike Vecchione
Jimmy portrays Joe Biden in audio of a visit to a hardware store; Tonight Show Good Name Bad Name Great Name; Tonight Show Audience Suggestion Box (Jimmy uses an app to make politicians sing, Jimmy uses a green tube to visit Don Lemon on the set of CNN Tonight with Don Lemon to celebrate Mario Day, Jimmy denies that there is a pot of gold hidden in 30 Rockefeller Plaza, Jimmy and The Roots eatbox, Norman Reedus' Guide to Motorcycle Sounds, Jimmy throws a boomerang); Know Your Sis (Charli & Dixie D'Amelio)
1422A	March 11, 2021	Jennifer Garner, Don Lemon	Adrianne Lenker
Fact Vs. Fiction; Tonight Show Film Fest; Tonight Show #hashtags: #MyFamilyIsWeird; Tonight Show Random Instrument Challenge (Jennifer Garner); Adrianne Lenker performed "Dragon Eyes"
1423A	March 12, 2021	Nick Offerman, Hailey Bieber	Freddie Gibbs featuring The Alchemist
Jimmy and Tariq have an argument; Jimmy breaks down how to spend the $1400 stimulus checks; Thank You Notes; Tonight Show Film Fest; Tonight Show True Confessions (Nick Offerman, Hailey Bieber); Freddie Gibbs featuring The Alchemist performed "Scottie Beam"
1424A	March 15, 2021	John Oliver, Brian Tyree Henry	Japanese Breakfast
Donald Trump Video; Tonight Show Drop It In; Hey Robot... (John Oliver); Japanese Breakfast performed "Be Sweet"
1425A	March 16, 2021	Benedict Cumberbatch, Madelaine Petsch	Rosé
Heinz Condiment Name Combos; Jimmy and Nick Jonas performed "Three Dots"; Tonight Show Out of Contexts; Tonight Show A to Z (Benedict Cumberbatch); Rosé performed "On the Ground"
1426A	March 17, 2021	Jerry Seinfeld, Taylor Kinney	Camilo
Tonight Show News Smash; Tonight Show #hashtags: #PartyFail; Tonight Show Life Coach with Jerry Seinfeld (Jerry Seinfeld); Camilo performed "Ropa Cara"; Jimmy and Tariq have a Guinness pouring contest
1427A	March 18, 2021	Michelle Obama, Guy Raz	Edie Brickell & New Bohemians
Tonight Show Sorry! Wrong Zoom (Michelle Obama); Tonight Show Michelle Obama Settles It (Michelle Obama); Edie Brickell & New Bohemians performed "Stubborn Love"
1428E	March 19, 2021	Matthew McConaughey, Megan Rapinoe	Morris Day featuring Trinidad Jame$
Jimmy broadcasts near his house; the night's broadcast is sponsored by Feeding America and State Farm; Thank You Notes; Ask the Fallons; Morris Day featuring Trinidad Jame$ performed "Headrush"; Jimmy goes back to the set and sees Steve Higgins for the first time since the COVID-19 pandemic shutdown
1429	March 22, 2021	Tracee Ellis Ross, Andy Cohen	Aaron Frazer
Note: First broadcast back in Studio 6B since the COVID-19 lockdown; return to the set; audience for the week is made up of first responders and health care workers; Steve Higgins is back in over a year; Tonight Show News Radio; Tonight Show Go On, Git!; Tonight Show One Second Reality TV Quiz (Andy Cohen); Aaron Frazer performed "Lover Girl"
1430	March 23, 2021	Chelsea Handler, Russell Brand	Mary Beth Barone
Tonight Show Polls; Tonight Show Why Is Your Pet Better Than Me?; Tonight Show Wheel of Opinions (Chelsea Handler); Russell Brand's dog makes an appearance during the interview; Russell Brand shows Jimmy a breathing exercise
1431	March 24, 2021	Alexander Skarsgård, Karol G	Karol G
Tonight Show News Flub Final Four; Jimmy breaks down the cost of Disney+ Premier Access Vs. going out to a movie theater; Tonight Show #hashtags: #MyWeirdSuperstition; Alexander Skarsgård shows his drawings; Karol G performed "El Barco"
1432	March 25, 2021	Maya Rudolph, Christopher Meloni	24kGoldn
Tonight Show Tariq's Irk List; Tonight Show Mimic Challenge (Maya Rudolph); 24kGoldn performed "3, 2, 1"
1433	March 26, 2021	Viola Davis, Addison Rae	Addison Rae
Tonight Show Remix; Thank You Notes; Addison Rae teaches Jimmy eight TikTok dances; Addison Rae performed "Obsessed"

=== April ===
No.	Original release date	Guest(s)	Musical/entertainment guest(s)
1434	April 5, 2021	Milo Ventimiglia, The Lucas Brothers	Lil Tjay featuring 6LACK
People Who Won't Be Winning the Mask Innovation Challenge; TikTok creators chat with Jimmy; Tonight Show Emotional Interview (Milo Ventimiglia); Lil Tjay featuring 6LACK performed "Calling My Phone"
1435	April 6, 2021	Pete Davidson, Gaten Matarazzo	Glass Animals
Tonight Show News Radio; Tonight Show Random Instrument Challenge (Pete Davidson); Glass Animals performed "Heat Waves"
1436	April 7, 2021	Denis Leary, Cristin Milioti	Rod Wave
Jimmy portrays Joe Biden in audio footage; Sylvester Stallone/Bob Dylan/Bruce Springsteen impromtu interview (Jimmy portrays all); Tonight Show #hashtags: #MySignatureMove; The Yahoo! Answers Lounge Singers (Jimmy Fallon & Cristin Milioti); Rod Wave performed "Tombstone"
1437	April 8, 2021	Carey Mulligan, Caleb McLaughlin	Kali Uchis
Mike Pence Memoir Titles; Mike Pence Leaked Audiobook Recording (Jimmy portrays Pence); Tonight Show Search It & Reverse It; Tonight Show Box of Lies (Carey Mulligan); Kali Uchis performed "Telepatía"
1438	April 9, 2021	Demi Lovato, Alan Kim	Demi Lovato
Tonight Show News Smash; Thank You Notes; Tonight Show Cake Off (Jimmy Fallon & Tariq); Tonight Show One Word Songs (Demi Lovato); Demi Lovato performed "Dancing with the Devil"
1439	April 12, 2021	Snoop Dogg, H.E.R.	H.E.R.
Robert De Niro in Big Trailer; Tonight Show Good Name Bad Name Great Name; Tonight Show Best Friends Challenge (Snoop Dogg, Martha Stewart); H.E.R. performed "Fight for You"
1440	April 13, 2021	Joseph Gordon-Levitt, Phoebe Robinson	Celeste
Government Compromises; Usher Phone Call; Tonight Show News & Improved; Tonight Show Show Me Something Good; Face It Challenge (Joseph Gordon-Levitt); Celeste performed "Love Is Back"
1441	April 14, 2021	Allison Janney, Ṣọpẹ́ Dìrísù	Pooh Shiesty
Tariq is upset about the many shortages due to the pandemic; Missing Rabbit Posters; Fact Vs. Fiction; Freestylin' with The Roots; Tonight Show Dramatic Mom Texts (Allison Janney); Pooh Shiesty performed "Back in Blood"
1442	April 15, 2021	Ice-T, Mike Birbiglia	Orlando Leyba
F9 Trailer; Tonight Show Among Us (Gaten Matarazzo, Noah Schnapp, The Roots, Victoria Tran, Sykkuno, Valkyrae & Corpse Husband); Tonight Show #hashtags: #DescribeAMovieBadly; Ice-T discusses his thoughts behind his tweets
1443	April 16, 2021	Russell Wilson & Ciara, Eiza González	Jon Pardi
White Claw Hard Seltzer Vs. White Claw Surge; Thank You Notes; Tonight Show Jinx Challenge (Russell Wilson & Ciara); Jon Pardi performed "Tequila Little Time"
1444	April 19, 2021	Michael Strahan, Tig Notaro	Emmy Blotnick
Everyone says what their special order is at McDonald's; Golf Pong (Michael Strahan)
1445	April 20, 2021	Jane Fonda, Robin Thede, Joy Reid	Alanis Morissette
Jimmy addresses the conviction of Derek Chauvin in the murder of George Floyd at the top of the program; Tonight Show Best Worst First (Jane Fonda); Alanis Morissette performed "I Miss the Band"
1446	April 21, 2021	Elisabeth Moss, James Cameron	Carlos Vives featuring Ricky Martin
New Pilot Questionnaire; Tonight Show Audience Suggestion Box (Jimmy & The Roots shows pictures of themselves from kindergarten, Let's Get Siri–ous: Oscar Edition, everyone does horse impressions, Jimmy DVRs the show, Jimmy shows an MCU recap, Mortal Prombat); Carlos Vives featuring Ricky Martin performed "Canción Bonita"
1447	April 22, 2021	Kevin Bacon, Simone Biles	Ritt Momney
Politician Statements; Product Placement in Classic Films; Tariq's Teachable Moment; Tonight Show #hashtags: #StonerThoughts; First Drafts of Rock (Kevin Bacon); Ritt Momney performed "Put Your Records On"
1448	April 23, 2021	Anna Kendrick, Wayne Federman	Masked Wolf
Steve Higgins wears Kiss makeup; Tonight Show Popular Mathematics; Thank You Notes; Tonight Show Sing It Like (Anna Kendrick); Masked Wolf performed "Astronaut in the Ocean"
1449	April 26, 2021	Magic Johnson, Roger Daltrey	Moneybagg Yo
Uhh... I Have Some Questions; Jimmy Fallon, Justin Bieber & The Roots sing "Peaches" with classroom instruments; Tonight Show Do Not Play; Tonight Show First Draft Pick (Magic Johnson); Moneybagg Yo performed "Time Today/Hard for the Next"
1450	April 27, 2021	Michael Che, Kate Upton	Nicki Nicole with special guest Lunay
United States Congress Census 2020; Tonight Show News from the Future; Tonight Show Wheel of Opinions (Michael Che); Nicki Nicole with special guest Lunay performed "Wapo Traketero/No Toque Mi Naik"
1451	April 28, 2021	Luke Bryan, Brian Regan	Rupi Kaur
Joe Biden Presidential Address Moments (Jimmy portrays Biden); Tonight Show Screengrabs; Tonight Show Singing Whisper Challenge (Luke Bryan)
1452	April 29, 2021	Michael B. Jordan, Nate Bargatze	Coi Leray
Crew Epilogues; Fast Stats; Tonight Show #hashtags: #WhyImSingle; Tonight Show Word Sneak (Michael B. Jordan); Coi Leray performed "No More Parties"
1453	April 30, 2021	James Spader, Abbi Jacobson	Beach Bunny
Tonight Show Puppy Predictors: 2021 Kentucky Derby Edition; Thank You Notes; Beach Bunny performed "Cloud Nine"

=== May ===
No.	Original release date	Guest(s)	Musical/entertainment guest(s)
1454	May 3, 2021	Vince Vaughn, Aidy Bryant	Girl in Red
Gerber Commercial; Hey, At Least I'm Not That Guy; Tonight Show Supermom Surprise; Jimmy counts down the top/bottom songs on the charts; Tonight Show 5–Second Summaries (Vince Vaughn); Girl in Red performed "Serotonin"
1455	May 4, 2021	Andrew Garfield, Sara Bareilles, Renée Elise Goldsberry, Paula Pell, Busy Philipps	Thomas Rhett
Fact Vs. Fiction; Tonight Show Supermom Surprise; Tonight Show Rap Remix; Tonight Show One–Second Viral Video Quiz (Andrew Garfield); Thomas Rhett performed "Country Again"
1456	May 5, 2021	Channing Tatum, Josh Duhamel	Joyelle Nicole Johnson
Jimmy, The Roots & Sara Bareilles, Renée Elise Goldsberry, Paula Pell and Busy Philipps performed "Wannabe"; Tonight Show #hashtags: #MomQuotes; Tonight Show Kid Recipes (Channing Tatum)
1457	May 6, 2021	Jessica Alba, Marc Maron	Sech
Tonight Show News Smash; Tonight Show Supermom Surprise; What's Behind Me (Jessica Alba); Sech performed "Sal y Perrea"
1458	May 7, 2021	Jessica Biel & Chiara Aurelia, Nick Thune	Mad Foxes
Zales Commercial; Tariq is upset about everything being pulled; Mother's Day Coupons; Tonight Show Supermom Surprise; Thank You Notes; Nick Thune tries out new comedy material; Mad Foxes performed "Crystal Glass"
1459	May 10, 2021	Leslie Jones, X González	Weezer
Tariq's segment has been cut (Tariq and Jimmy performed "Just Once"); Tonight Show Bad Signs; Tonight Show Life Coach with Leslie Jones (Leslie Jones); Weezer performed "All the Good Ones"
1460	May 11, 2021	Joel McHale, Thalía	Thalía
Tonight Show Polls; Tonight Show Why Is Your Pet Better Than Me?; Tonight Show A to Z (Joel McHale); Thalía performed "Mojito"
1461	May 12, 2021	Dave Chappelle, Nikki Glaser	J.Period featuring Black Thought & Tiffany Gouché with narration by Dave Chappelle
Republican Statements; Tonight Show News Radio; Tonight Show Dave Chappelle Settles It (Dave Chappelle); J.Period featuring Black Thought & Tiffany Gouché with narration by Dave Chappelle performed "All In Your Head"
1462	May 13, 2021	Keegan-Michael Key, Zoey Deutch	Conway the Machine featuring J.I.D & Ludacris
Joe Biden Congress Meeting (Jimmy portrays Biden); Greatest Moments in Zoom History; Tonight Show News & Improved; Tonight Show #hashtags: #AddAWordRuinATVShow; Conway the Machine featuring J.I.D & Ludacris performed "Scatterbrained"
1463	May 14, 2021	Chance the Rapper, Fred Armisen	Alan Jackson
Mask Memories; Jimmy and Tariq lip sync "Without You"; Thank You Notes; Tonight Show Auto–Tune Up (Chance the Rapper); Alan Jackson performed "Way Down in My Whiskey"
1464	May 17, 2021	Pink, Eric Bana	Natti Natasha featuring Becky G
Politician Spending; Tonight Show Podcasts; Tonight Show Misname That Song (Pink); Natti Natasha featuring Becky G performed "Ram Pam Pam"
1465	May 18, 2021	Chris Rock, WILLOW	WILLOW featuring Travis Barker
Normal Vs. Not Normal; Tariq correctly guesses the sketch (Giuliani Slogans); Tonight Show True Confessions (Chris Rock, 21 Savage); WILLOW featuring Travis Barker performed "Transparent Soul"
1466	May 19, 2021	Blake Shelton, Fran Lebowitz	Regard, Troye Sivan and Tate McRae
Inspiring Words from Your Commander in Chief; Joe Biden Factory Tour Audio (Jimmy portrays Biden); Tonight Show #hashtags: #MisheardLyrics; Tonight Show Jinx Challenge (Blake Shelton & Kelly Clarkson Vs. Jimmy Fallon & Tariq); Regard, Troye Sivan and Tate McRae performed "You"
1467	May 20, 2021	Tina Fey, Wyatt Cenac	Dayglow
Lil John/Usher/DJ Khaled Recording; Vaccine Incentives; Tonight Show Random Instrument Challenge (Tina Fey); Dayglow performed "Close to You"
1468	May 21, 2021	Constance Wu, Bowen Yang	Lord Huron featuring August Ponthier
Dating App Badges; Tariq Proves His Case/Jimmy Proves His Case; Tonight Show Picture This; Thank You Notes; Lord Huron featuring August Ponthier performed "I Lied"
1469	May 24, 2021	Dave Grohl, Lil Nas X	Blake Shelton
Dave Grohl co-hosts the broadcast; Dave Grohl performed "Best of You" remixed; Tonight Show Off Songs Song Off (Dave Grohl); Commercial Jingles (Dave Grohl); Blake Shelton performed "Minimum Wage"
1470	May 25, 2021	Kevin Hart, Chrissy Metz	St. Vincent
Tonight Show Good Name Bad Name Great Name; Freestylin' with The Roots; St. Vincent performed "Down"
1471	May 26, 2021	Sofía Vergara, Jack Antonoff	Bleachers
Fact Vs. Fiction; Tonight Show #hashtags: #CollegeInSixWords; Tonight Show Piece of Cake Trivia (Sofía Vergara); Bleachers performed "How Dare You Want More"
1472	May 27, 2021	Michael Douglas, Billy Porter	Mustafa
HBO Max Friends Plans; Vaccine Incentives; Tonight Show Sponsors; Tonight Show BBQ Off (appearance by Claire Saffitz); Steve Higgins and Questlove try the BBQ; Mustafa performed "What About Heaven"
1473	May 28, 2021	Julianne Moore, Dave Bautista	Twenty One Pilots
Bad BBQ Clues and Warnings; Tonight Show Tiny Song; Tonight Show Superlatives; Thank You Notes; Tonight Show Mad Lib Theater (Julianne Moore); Twenty One Pilots performed "Shy Away"

=== June ===
No.	Original release date	Guest(s)	Musical/entertainment guest(s)
1474	June 7, 2021	Robert De Niro, Anthony Ramos	Anne-Marie & Niall Horan
Note: First full capacity audience since the COVID-19 pandemic began; Men's Warehouse Ad; Tonight Show News Radio; Tonight Show Do Not Play; Anne-Marie & Niall Horan performed "Our Song"
1475	June 8, 2021	Lin-Manuel Miranda, Phoebe Dynevor	Sharon Van Etten & Angel Olsen
Let's Get Siri–ous; Greatest Moments in Zoom History; Lin-Manuel Miranda and Jimmy sing about the Broadway industry reopening in September, performing "Broadway's Back!" (appearances by Olga Merediz, Phylicia Rashad, Kristin Chenoweth, Christopher Jackson, Laura Benanti and Jimmy Smits); Sharon Van Etten & Angel Olsen performed "Like I Used To"
1476	June 9, 2021	Kristen Bell, Dane DeHaan	Migos
Joe Biden Goals; Charles Rettig Statements; F9 Cannes Film Festival Trailer; Tonight Show News & Improved; Tonight Show Show Me Something Good; Tonight Show You Can Only Keep One (Kristen Bell); Migos performed "Avalanche"
1477	June 10, 2021	Jason Momoa, Rose Byrne	Clairo
British Vs. Joe Biden Slang; Fast Stats; Tonight Show #hashtags: #AddAWordRuinASportsTeam; Water War (Jason Momoa); Clairo performed "Blouse"
1478	June 11, 2021	Kathryn Hahn, Jon M. Chu	Polo G
Tiny Song; Tonight Show Sponsors; Thank You Notes; Tonight Show Emotional Interview (Kathryn Hahn); Polo G performed "Rap Star"
1479	June 14, 2021	Ethan Hawke, Ilana Glazer	Jack Ingram, Miranda Lambert and Jon Randall
The Queen's Diary; Joe Biden NATO Summit Audio (Jimmy portrays Biden); Tonight Show Polls; Jimmy counts down the top/bottom songs on the charts; Tonight Show 5–Second Summaries (Ethan Hawke); Jack Ingram, Miranda Lambert and Jon Randall performed "Two-Step Down to Texas"
1480	June 15, 2021	Salma Hayek, Dr. Anthony Fauci	Jessie Ware
Let's Get Siri–ous; YouTube Videos; Tonight Show #hashtags: #Dadvice; Tonight Show Whisper Challenge (Salma Hayek); Jessie Ware performed "Remember Where You Are"
1481	June 16, 2021	Seth Meyers, Annie Murphy	Coldplay
Tonight Show Tariq's Irk List; Tonight Show True Confessions (Seth Meyers, Annie Murphy); Coldplay performed "Higher Power"
1482	June 17, 2021	Helen Mirren, Kenya Barris	Noel Gallagher's High Flying Birds
Kushner's Book Titles; Travel Posters; Unpopular Father's Day Cards; Thank You Notes; Noel Gallagher's High Flying Birds performed "We're On Our Way Now"
1483	June 21, 2021	Scarlett Johansson, Questlove	Graham Kay
Audience no longer needs to wear masks; Celebrity Quotes; Fake/Real Amazon.com Reviews; Tonight Show Why Is Your Pet Better Than Me?; Tonight Show One–Second Marvel Quiz (Scarlett Johansson)
1484	June 22, 2021	Vin Diesel, Riley Keough	Modest Mouse
Questlove and Tariq re-enact a scene from The Bachelorette; Kristen Bell and Jimmy sing about dogs; Freestylin' with The Roots; Vin Diesel thanks fans for the success of the Fast & Furious franchise on the 20th anniversary of the release of the original film; Modest Mouse performed "We Are Between"
1485	June 23, 2021	John Cena, Henry Winkler	Majid Jordan
Republican Body Doubles; Things You Should Avoid Saying on Tinder Hot Takes; Tonight Show Popular Mathematics; Tonight Show #hashtags: #WeddingFail; Tonight Show 30 Seconds To... (John Cena); Tonight Show Wheel of Opinions (Henry Winkler); Majid Jordan performed "Waves of Blue"
1486	June 24, 2021	Jon Hamm, Ozuna	Rojo Perez
Joe Biden: Whisper–in–Chief; Uhh... I Have Some Questions; Fact Vs. Fiction; Jimmy plays Mario Golf: Super Rush with Collin Morikawa; Egg Russian Roulette (Jon Hamm)
1487	June 25, 2021	Charlize Theron, Willie Nelson	Beabadoobee
The Extremely Eccentric Mini Planet; Tonight Show Superlatives; Thank You Notes; Beabadoobee performed "Last Day on Earth"

=== July ===
No.	Original release date	Guest(s)	Musical/entertainment guest(s)
1488	July 12, 2021	Tom Hiddleston, Tig Notaro	GoldLink featuring Flo Milli
Joe Biden's Summer Reading List; Tonight Show Do Not Play; Tonight Show Mimic Challenge (Tom Hiddleston); GoldLink featuring Flo Milli performed "Raindrops"
1489	July 13, 2021	BTS, Édgar Ramírez	BTS
Tonight Show Sponsors; Tonight Show #hashtags: #AddAWordRuinAMovie; BTS responds to rumors about themselves; BTS performed "Permission to Dance"
1490	July 14, 2021	Don Cheadle, Cecily Strong	BTS
Sleepy World Leader of the Night: Angela Merkel Edition; Tennessee State Mottos; Greatest Moments in Zoom History; The Tonight Show Fallon Summer Reads; Something Stupid with Cecily Strong (Cecily Strong); BTS performed "Butter"
1491	July 15, 2021	Mark Wahlberg, Mark Hamill	John Mayer
Steve Mnuchin Statements; Tariq is upset about everything being recalled; Jimmy uses his Amazon Alexa to become Shaquille O'Neal's voice (guest appearance by Shaquille O'Neal); Tonight Show News Radio; The Tonight Show Fallon Summer Reads; Tonight Show Know Your Role (Mark Hamill); John Mayer performed "Shouldn't Matter but It Does"
1492	July 19, 2021	Dwayne Johnson, Joshua Jackson	Swedish House Mafia featuring Ty Dolla $ign & 070 Shake
Bruce Springsteen Phone Call; Tonight Show Florida News Roulette; The Tonight Show Fallon Summer Reads; Tonight Show Screengrabs; Swedish House Mafia featuring Ty Dolla $ign & 070 Shake performed "Lifetime/It Gets Better"; a clip from Late Night with Jimmy Fallon is shown featuring Jeff Goldblum and Biz Markie at the end of the broadcast as a tribute to Markie, who died the Friday before the original broadcast of the episode.
1493	July 20, 2021	Jonas Brothers, Zoe Lister-Jones	Omar Apollo
Jimmy sees how many jokes he can tell in 30 seconds; Let's Get Siri–ous; The Tonight Show Fallon Summer Reads; Tonight Show Picture This; Tonight Show #hashtags: #DescribeASportBadly; Tonight Show Sing It Like (Jonas Brothers); Omar Apollo performed "Go Away"
1494	July 21, 2021	Emilia Clarke, Mark Ronson	Brandi Carlile
Olympic Sport Logos with Other Meanings; Airline Slogans; Tonight Show Polls; Tonight Show Burger Off (appearance by George Motz); Around the World (Emilia Clarke); Brandi Carlile performed "Right on Time"
1495	July 22, 2021	Kate Beckinsale, Fred Armisen	Leon Bridges
Ron Hobbs; Tokyo Olympics Fact Vs. Fiction; Jimmy criticizes the fact that a board game film adaptation is in development; Tonight Show Box of Lies (Kate Beckinsale); Kate Beckinsale and Jimmy wear beards; Fred Armisen plays guitar; Leon Bridges performed "Steam"
1496	July 23, 2021	Matt Damon, Jason Sudeikis	Camila Cabello
Note: First show with both guests and musical performance in studio since the COVID-19 pandemic began; Jimmy and Tariq performed an original song about the Tokyo Olympics at the top of the program; Thank You Notes; Tonight Show Will It Fit? (BTS); Camila Cabello performed "Don't Go Yet"

=== August ===
No.	Original release date	Guest(s)	Musical/entertainment guest(s)
1497	August 9, 2021	Billie Eilish, Abigail Breslin	Billie Eilish
Tonight Show Sponsors; Tonight Show Why Is Your Pet Better Than Me?; Billie Eilish performed "Happier Than Ever"
1498	August 10, 2021	Barbra Streisand, Marlon Wayans	Snoh Aalegra
Let's Get Siri–ous; Questlove and Tariq re-enact a scene from The Bachelorette; Tonight Show News & Improved; Tonight Show Podcasts; Snoh Aalegra performed "Lost You"
1499	August 11, 2021	Billy Crystal, Katie Ledecky, Jean Hanff Korelitz	Jackie Fabulous
Tonight Show Good Name Bad Name Great Name; Tonight Show #hashtags: #AddAWordRuinABook
1500	August 12, 2021	Kit Harington, Miranda Cosgrove	Duran Duran
National Weather Service Heat Advisory Tips; Jimmy thanks the crew, Steve Higgins and The Roots on 1500 episodes; A Look Back at 1500 Episodes; Tonight Show News Radio; Thank You Notes; Straight Up Goes for It (Kit Harington); Duran Duran performed "Invisible"
1501	August 16, 2021	Melissa McCarthy, Jai Courtney	Little Simz
Real Vs. Fake Vaccine Cards; Tariq is upset about things being recalled; Hey Robot... (Melissa McCarthy); Little Simz performed "Woman"
1502	August 17, 2021	Michael Shannon, Paris Hilton	Courtney Barnett
Spirit Airlines Profit Losses; Tonight Show #hashtags: #MySummerInSixWords; Jimmy gives Michael Shannon a t-shirt; Michael Shannon tries to throw a pen into the mouth of a Hashtag the Panda plush toy; Tonight Show Slow Turn Tiny Nod (Michael Shannon); Courtney Barnett performed "Rae Street"
1503	August 18, 2021	Michael Keaton, Heidi Klum	Vince Staples featuring Fousheé
Extra Hotel Charges; Books About Trump; Freestylin' with The Roots; Michael Keaton and Jimmy exchange signed tissues; German Word Quiz (Heidi Klum); Vince Staples featuring Fousheé performed "Take Me Home"
1504	August 19, 2021	Octavia Spencer, Common	Common featuring Black Thought and Seun Kuti
Jimmy uses Netflix series to talk about a Netflix news story; Thank You Notes; Tonight Show Rap Remix (Common); Common featuring Black Thought and Seun Kuti performed "When We Move"
1505	August 23, 2021	Kelly Clarkson, Yahya Abdul-Mateen II	Bakar
Tonight Show News Smash; Mike Richards' personal Jeopardy! categories; Jimmy counts down the top/bottom songs on the chart (Bottom of the Charts); Bakar performed "The Mission"
1506	August 24, 2021	Andy Samberg, Madelyn Cline	Andrea Bocelli
Johnson & Johnson Vaccine Ad; Tonight Show Popular Mathematics; Tonight Show Misname That Song (Andy Samberg); Andrea Bocelli performed "You'll Never Walk Alone"
1507	August 25, 2021	Molly Shannon, Eugenio Derbez	Chvrches
Greatest Moments in Zoom History; Tonight Show #hashtags: #MyTeacherIsFunny; Cry Off (Molly Shannon); Chvrches performed "Good Girls"
1508	August 26, 2021	Camila Cabello, Ryan Tedder	OneRepublic
Ebola Farms Baked Goods Ad; Congressmen Facial Recognition; Tonight Show Polls; Thank You Notes; OneRepublic performed "Someday"

=== September ===
No.	Original release date	Guest(s)	Musical/entertainment guest(s)
1509	September 7, 2021	Trevor Noah, Beanie Feldstein	Gorillaz featuring AJ Tracey
Paramount Pictures/Statue Statements; Jeff Bezos Statements; Tonight Show Sponsors; Tonight Show Do Not Play; Tonight Show First Try (Trevor Noah); Gorillaz featuring AJ Tracey performed "Jimmy Jimmy"
1510	September 8, 2021	Pete Davidson, Meredith Hagner	Baby Keem
Tonight Show News & Improved; Tonight Show Show Me Something Good; Tonight Show Wheel of Opinions (Pete Davidson, appearance by Jon Stewart); Baby Keem performed "Issues"
1511	September 9, 2021	John Cena, J Balvin	J Balvin
Jimmy is stuck in the Matrix in the cold open after The Matrix Resurrections trailer dropped; Jimmy performed an original song about the NFL; Tonight Show Superlatives; Tonight Show #hashtags: #FootballRaps; Facebreakers (John Cena); J Balvin teaches Jimmy a dance; J Balvin performed "In da Getto"
1512	September 10, 2021	Reese Witherspoon, Simu Liu	Lisa
Fact Vs. Fiction; Thank You Notes; Lisa performed "Lalisa"
1513	September 13, 2021	Andrew Garfield, Patton Oswalt	Little Shop of Horrors
Jimmy performed an original song about New York City; Tonight Show Good Name Bad Name Great Name; Tonight Show Screengrabs; Little Shop of Horrors performed "Little Shop of Horrors/Skid Row (Downtown)"
1514	September 14, 2021	Kendall Jenner, Antoni Porowski	Tina: The Tina Turner Musical
Fast Stats; Tonight Show #hashtags: #MyWeirdRoommate; Tonight Show Who Said It (Kendall Jenner); Jimmy brings out a cardboard cutout of Antoni Porowski; Tina: The Tina Turner Musical performed "Private Dancer"
1515	September 15, 2021	Ben Platt, JoJo Siwa	Ben Platt
Tariq and Jimmy rap about chicken; Tariq is upset about things being recalled; Tonight Show Fast Dance Off (JoJo Siwa); Ben Platt performed "Waving Through the Window"
1516	September 16, 2021	Amy Adams, Billy Crudup	Six
Jimmy tries to log in to his Microsoft account; Tonight Show Podcasts; Six performed "Ex-Wives"
1517	September 17, 2021	Jennifer Aniston, Amandla Stenberg	Wicked
Tonight Show News Smash; Insurrectionist Signs; Tonight Show Superlatives; Thank You Notes; This Just In (Jennifer Aniston); Wicked performed "Popular/The Wizard and I"
1518	September 20, 2021	Hasan Minhaj, James Wolk	Meek Mill
Pfizer–BioNTech COVID-19 vaccine Ad; Donald Trump's Mitch McConnell Replacement Recommendations; Tonight Show Polls; Freestylin' with The Roots; Tonight Show Life Coach with Hasan Minhaj (Hasan Minhaj); Meek Mill performed "Blue Notes II" with special appearance by Lil Uzi Vert
1519	September 21, 2021	Nicole Kidman, Amanda Gorman	Nore Davis
Google Meet Ad; Tonight Show Icebreakers; Tonight Show #hashtags: #DescribeAMovieBadly; Tonight Show The Neverwed Game (Nicole Kidman)
1520	September 22, 2021	Steve Martin & Martin Short, Margaret Qualley, Dr. Jane Goodall	Cynthia Erivo
Steve Martin, Martin Short and Jimmy catch up backstage (Tonight Show Chess, Tonight Show Guess My Temperature, Rat Trap); Password (Margaret Qualley & Jimmy Fallon Vs. Steve Martin & Martin Short); Cynthia Erivo performed "You're Not Here"
1521	September 23, 2021	Michael Strahan, Colin Quinn, Justin Willman	The Killers
Jimmy announces the taping of the night's show around New York City at the top of the program; Mariano Rivera teaches Jimmy to pitch a baseball; Jimmy throws out the first pitch at a New York Yankees game; Jimmy goes to Madame Tussauds in New York with Michael Strahan and pranks guests before the interview; Colin Quinn and Jimmy have pizza at Joe & Pat's in Staten Island; The Roots and Jimmy visit Coney Island in Brooklyn where Justin Willman performs a magic trick; The Killers performed "Dying Breed" at the Top of the Rock
1522	September 24, 2021	Andy Cohen, Alessia Cara	Alessia Cara
Hot Sax; Mario Voice Casting Audition Reel; Tonight Show Superlatives; Thank You Notes; Tonight Show Wheel of Musical Impressions (Alessia Cara); Tonight Show Who Said It? (Andy Cohen); Alessia Cara performed "Best Days"
1523	September 27, 2021	Snoop Dogg, Chris Colfer	Mickey Guyton
Pfizer CEO Statement; Tonight Show Sponsors; Tonight Show Why Is Your Pet Better Than Me?; Tonight Show One–Second Songs (Snoop Dogg); Mickey Guyton performed "Lay It on Me"
1524	September 28, 2021	Jake Gyllenhaal, Karamo Brown	G-Eazy featuring Demi Lovato
Jimmy, Questlove and Steve Higgins tell each other what they are watching; Tonight Show Bad Signs; G-Eazy featuring Demi Lovato performed "Breakdown"
1525	September 29, 2021	Maluma, Michael Gandolfini	GIVĒON
Congressmen/Senator Job Applications; The Bachelor Potential Host Questions; Tariq loves coffee; Tonight Show Popular Mathematics; Tonight Show #hashtags: #MakeASongAboutFall; Tonight Show One Word Songs (Maluma); GIVĒON performed "For Tonight"
1526	September 30, 2021	Jeff Daniels, Chloe Fineman	The Flaming Lips
Congressmen Statements; Brady's Fashion Lines; Tonight Show Pizza Off (appearance by Scott Wiener); Tonight Show Interview of Impressions (Chloe Fineman); The Flaming Lips performed "Mother I've Taken LSD"

=== October ===
No.	Original release date	Guest(s)	Musical/entertainment guest(s)
1527	October 1, 2021	Jerry Seinfeld, Léa Seydoux	TWICE
New England Patriots Fan Signs; Tonight Show Superlatives; Thank You Notes; Lego Seinfeld (Jerry Seinfeld); TWICE performed "The Feels"
1528	October 4, 2021	Seth Meyers, Cobie Smulders	Farruko
The Roots have purchased the Folgers Coffee jingle and have buyers' remorse; Squid Game Spin-Off; Jimmy counts down the top/bottom songs on the chart (Bottom of the Charts); Catchphrase (Seth Meyers & Cobie Smulders Vs. Jimmy Fallon & Tariq); Farruko performed "Pepas"
1529	October 5, 2021	Queen Latifah, Kaitlyn Dever	Chris Stapleton
Facebook Statement; Tonight Show Do Not Play; Tonight Show Best Friends Challenge (Queen Latifah); Chris Stapleton performed "You Should Probably Leave"
1530	October 6, 2021	Anthony Anderson, The Cast of Squid Game	Charli XCX
Squid Game Subtitles; Bill de Blasio Mayoral Slogans; Tariq is tired of the news (News Alert); Tonight Show #hashtags: #MyCrazyInvention; Tonight Show Schoolyard Games (The Cast of Squid Game); Charli XCX performed "Good Ones"
1531	October 7, 2021	Madonna, The Kids Tonight Show hosts	Reba McEntire
Tonight Show News Smash; Hot Goss!; Tonight Show Kid Theater (Madonna); Reba McEntire performed "Take It Back/Why Haven't I Heard from You"
1532	October 8, 2021	Jason Momoa, Ana de Armas	Big Red Machine
Tonight Show Superlatives; Thank You Notes; Tonight Show Box of Lies (Ana de Armas); Jimmy dresses up as Jason Momoa; Big Red Machine performed "The Ghost of Cincinnati"
1533	October 11, 2021	Chelsea Handler, Finn Wolfhard	James Blake featuring Slowthai
Tonight Show Picture This; Tonight Show True Confessions (Chelsea Handler, Finn Wolfhard); James Blake featuring Slowthai performed "Funeral"
1534	October 12, 2021	Daniel Craig, Meghan Trainor	Chlöe
Tonight Show You Pick the Joke; Jimmy and Chris Stapleton performed an original song about Nancy Meyers films; Daniel Craig reminisces about his fifteen years starring in the James Bond franchise and shares a martini with Jimmy; Chlöe performed "Have Mercy"
1535	October 13, 2021	Matt Damon, Ben Affleck & Nicole Holofcener, Victoria Beckham	Holly Humberstone
Uhh... I Have Some Questions; Tonight Show Can You Feel It? (Victoria Beckham); Holly Humberstone performed "Scarlett"
1536	October 14, 2021	Jamie Foxx, Phoebe Robinson, William Shatner	Tom Thakkar
Adele 30 Album Tracklist; The Complete Take Two (Jamie Foxx)
1537	October 15, 2021	Oscar Isaac, Jo Firestone	Alec Benjamin
The crew and Oscar Isaac listen to Adele; Tonight Show Superlatives; Thank You Notes; Oscar Isaac plays guitar; Alec Benjamin performed "Older"
1538	October 26, 2021	Drew Barrymore, Mo Rocca	Måneskin
Tonight Show Sponsors; What's Behind Me? (Drew Barrymore); Måneskin performed "Beggin'"
1539	October 27, 2021	Elton John, Ava DuVernay	Walker Hayes
New Netflix Series; Tariq is upset about things being recalled; Tonight Show News Radio; Walker Hayes performed "Fancy Like"
1540	October 28, 2021	Chrissy Teigen, Matthias Schweighöfer	Skepta
Facebook Ad; Tonight Show #hashtags: #MakeAMovieSoundScary; Tonight Show Rap Remix; Chrissy Teigen and Jimmy have a dish from her new cookbook; Tonight Show Pup Quiz (Chrissy Teigen); Matthias Schweighöfer teaches Jimmy how to dance; Skepta performed "Lit Like This"
1541	October 29, 2021	Idris Elba, Keri Russell	Sabrina Carpenter
Candy Warning Labels; Joe Biden/Pope Francis Inner Thoughts; Tonight Show Superlatives; Thank You Notes; Tonight Show The Fastest Card in the West (Idris Elba); Sabrina Carpenter performed "Skinny Dipping"

=== November ===
No.	Original release date	Guest(s)	Musical/entertainment guest(s)
1542	November 2, 2021	Kumail Nanjiani, Fred Armisen	Lucy Dacus
Tonight Show Polls; Pictionary (Tariq & Fred Armisen Vs. Kumail Nanjiani & Jimmy Fallon); Fred Armisen plays guitar; Lucy Dacus performed "VBS"
1543	November 3, 2021	Kristen Stewart, Bad Bunny	Joyelle Nicole Johnson
Jimmy, Tariq and Steve Higgins' Inner Thoughts; Freestylin' with The Roots
1544	November 4, 2021	Ariana Grande, Adrien Brody	Blxst featuring Ty Dolla $ign
Aaron Rodgers Statements; CVS Pharmacy Doctor Application Questions; Dunkin' Donuts Ad; Tonight Show Good Name Bad Name Great Name; Tonight Show #hashtags: #MyDreamApp; Adrien Brody does a magic trick; Blxst featuring Ty Dolla $ign performed "Chosen"
1545	November 5, 2021	Kieran Culkin, D.J. "Shangela" Pierce	Camilo with Evaluna
Tonight Show Superlatives; Thank You Notes; Tonight Show Who Said It? (Kieran Culkin); Camilo with Evaluna performed "Índigo"
1546	November 8, 2021	Michael Che, Ed Sheeran, Martha Stewart	Summer Walker
Vin Diesel Voicemail; Tonight Show News & Improved; Charades (Martha Stewart & Jimmy Fallon Vs. Michael Che & Ed Sheeran); Summer Walker performed "Unloyal"
1547	November 9, 2021	Will Smith, Jack Whitehall	Nathaniel Rateliff & The Night Sweats
Tonight Show #hashtags: #TheyNeedToFix; Tonight Show Name That Song Challenge (Will Smith); Nathaniel Rateliff & The Night Sweats performed "Survivor"
1548	November 10, 2021	Ryan Reynolds, Lucy Hale, Beeple	Sam Fender
Tonight Show News Smash; Tonight Show Sponsors; Note: Ryan Reynolds makes a surprise appearance in place of Will Ferrell, who canceled; Tonight Show You Have to Stop (Ryan Reynolds); Sam Fender performed "Spit of You"
1549	November 11, 2021	Taylor Swift, Colin Quinn	Jared Freid
Studio audience is made up of servicemen/women; Tiny Song; Box of Lies (Taylor Swift); Chris Rock makes a surprise appearance during Colin Quinn's interview
1550	November 12, 2021	Taraji P. Henson, Steve Zahn	Damon Albarn
DJ Khaled/Lil John/Jason Derulo Phone Call; Tonight Show Superlatives; Thank You Notes; Tonight Show Sing It Like (Taraji P. Henson); Damon Albarn performed "Darkness to Light"
1551	November 15, 2021	Bill Murray, Dan Aykroyd & Ernie Hudson, FINNEAS	FINNEAS
Tonight Show Pros and Cons; FINNEAS performed "Only a Lifetime"
1552	November 16, 2021	Jared Leto, Vanessa Hudgens	Tom Morello featuring grandson
Democrat Statements; Tonight Show Why Is Your Pet Better Than Me?; Jimmy helps Jared Leto come up with an album title; Tom Morello featuring grandson performed "Hold the Line"
1553	November 17, 2021	Lin-Manuel Miranda, Roman Reigns	Big Boi featuring Sleepy Brown
Papa John's Pizza Commercial; Tonight Show #hashtags: #IfIHadATrillionDollars; Tonight Show Wheel of Freestyle (Lin-Manuel Miranda); Big Boi featuring Sleepy Brown performed "Animals"
1554	November 18, 2021	Simu Liu, Ruth Negga	Big Sean featuring Hit-Boy
TJ Maxx Ad; Tariq is upset about things being recalled; Beat Saber (Simu Liu); Simu Liu shows Jimmy a dance move; Big Sean featuring Hit-Boy performed "What a Life"
1555	November 19, 2021	Whoopi Goldberg, Karol G	Dry Cleaning
The Real Turkeys of Gobblers Rest; Tonight Show Superlatives; Thank You Notes; Whoopi Goldberg brings Jimmy baked goods; Dry Cleaning performed "Scratchcard Lanyard"
1556	November 22, 2021	Jeremy Renner, Kristin Chenoweth	Ali Kolbert
Joe Biden Birthday Texts; Knockoff Toys; Tonight Show Picture This; Tonight Show Battle of the Instant Songwriters
1557	November 23, 2021	Hailee Steinfeld, Liza Koshy	Avril Lavigne with Travis Barker
Tonight Show #hashtags: #MyFamilyIsWeird; Tonight Show Do Not Read; Tonight Show Singing Whisper Challenge (Hailee Steinfeld); Avril Lavigne with Travis Barker performed "Bite Me"
1558	November 24, 2021	Julie Bowen, Keke Palmer	Zoe Wees
Bar Signs; Tiny Song; Bush Gardens Ad; Tonight Show Pros and Cons; Tonight Show Audience Suggestion Box (sports footage with tennis grunting, the world's largest hand turkey, the crew explains what they would do if they scored a touchdown); Julie Bowen and Jimmy recreate Hallmark Channel Christmas film posters; Keke Palmer does impressions; Zoe Wees performed "That's How It Goes"
1559	November 25, 2021	Will Ferrell & Paul Rudd, Sebastian Maniscalco	Jenny Lewis
What to Expect at the Airport; Tonight Show Superlatives; Thank You Notes; Tiny Dancer (Will Ferrell & Paul Rudd); Jenny Lewis performed "Puppy and a Truck"
1560	November 29, 2021	Michael Strahan, Alessia Cara	Pistol Annies
Fact Vs. Fiction; Tonight Show Musical Genre Challenge (Alessia Cara); Michael Strahan and Jimmy give a pep talk; Michael Strahan reads an unused monologue joke; Pistol Annies performed "Hell of a Holiday"
1561	November 30, 2021	Maya Rudolph, Nicholas Braun, Rita Moreno	Dusty Slay
Tonight Show Misname That Song (Maya Rudolph); Rita Moreno shows Jimmy how to perfect a dance move at the climax of "America" in West Side Story

=== December ===
No.	Original release date	Guest(s)	Musical/entertainment guest(s)
1562	December 1, 2021	Seth Rogen, Machine Gun Kelly	Macklemore featuring Windser
Mehmet Oz Senate Campaign Slogans; the crew shares the most-played songs on their Spotify playlists; Tonight Show #hashtags: #TravelFail; Tonight Show Auto–Tune Up (Machine Gun Kelly); Macklemore featuring Windser performed "Next Year"
1563	December 2, 2021	Blake Shelton, Ana Gasteyer & Rachel Dratch	Blake Shelton
Donald Trump Book Titles; Tonight Show 12 Days of Christmas Sweaters; Tonight Show Off Songs Song Off (Blake Shelton); Blake Shelton performed "Come Back as a Country Boy"
1564	December 3, 2021	Tyler Perry, Michael Bublé	CKay
Steve Higgins and Jimmy tell each other what holiday candles they are going to purchase; Tonight Show Superlatives; Thank You Notes; Tonight Show 12 Days of Christmas Sweaters; Password (Tyler Perry & Jimmy Fallon Vs. Questlove & Michael Bublé); CKay performed "Love Nwantiti/Emiliana"
1565	December 6, 2021	Jonah Hill, Tig Notaro	Dan + Shay
Jimmy debuts a new single with Ariana Grande and Megan Thee Stallion ("It Was a Masked Christmas"); Tonight Show 12 Days of Christmas Sweaters; Dan + Shay performed "Officially Christmas"
1566	December 7, 2021	Chloë Grace Moretz, Nick Thune	Wizkid featuring Tems
European Leader Advice for Joe Biden; Nicolas Cage/John Travolta Phone Call; Tig Notaro makes a surprise appearance after the monologue; Tonight Show 12 Days of Christmas Sweaters; Tonight Show Show Me Something Good; Chloë Grace Moretz impersonates Britney Spears; Wizkid featuring Tems performed "Essence"
1567	December 8, 2021	Nicole Kidman, Úrsula Corberó	Stromae
Person/Statue Statements; Tonight Show 12 Days of Christmas Sweaters; Tonight Show Can You Feel It? (Nicole Kidman); Jimmy asks Nicole Kidman holiday-related questions; Stromae performed "Santé"
1568	December 9, 2021	Miley Cyrus & Pete Davidson, Yahya Abdul-Mateen II	Miley Cyrus
Tonight Show 12 Days of Christmas Sweaters; Tonight Show True Confessions (Miley Cyrus & Pete Davidson); Yahya Abdul-Mateen II and Jimmy make portraits of each other; Miley Cyrus performed "It Should Have Been Me"
1569	December 10, 2021	President Joe Biden, Jodie Turner-Smith	Rick Ross featuring Jazmine Sullivan
Tiny Song; Tonight Show 12 Days of Christmas Sweaters; Thank You Notes; Tonight Show Superlatives; Jimmy gives Jodie Turner-Smith a gift basket; Rick Ross featuring Jazmine Sullivan performed "Outlawz"
1570	December 13, 2021	Dakota Johnson, Bobby Cannavale	Kelly Clarkson
Mike Pence Campaign Slogans; Tonight Show 12 Days of Christmas Sweaters; Jimmy quizzes Dakota Johnson on Home Alone; Tonight Show 5–Second Summaries (Dakota Johnson); Kelly Clarkson performed "Blessed"
1571	December 14, 2021	Matthew McConaughey, Alana Haim	Niko Moon
Tonight Show 12 Days of Christmas Sweaters; Matthew McConaughey and Jimmy performed an original Christmas song ("This Christmas Will Be Different") and "Christmas (Baby Please Come Home)" with special appearance by Haim; Niko Moon performed "No Sad Songs"
1572	December 15, 2021	Penélope Cruz, Kid Cudi, Joanna Stern	N/A
Tonight Show #hashtags: #AddAWordRuinAChristmasSong; Tonight Show 12 Days of Christmas Sweaters; Head Swap
1573	December 16, 2021	Scarlett Johansson, Bowen Yang	Toni Cornell
Tonight Show Drop It In; Tonight Show 12 Days of Christmas Sweaters; Tonight Show Do Not Play; Tonight Show Mimic Challenge (Scarlett Johansson); Toni Cornell performed "Nothing Compares 2 U"
1574	December 17, 2021	Reese Witherspoon, Mike Birbiglia	Robert Plant featuring Alison Krauss
Jimmy is torn on what toys to purchase for the holidays; Tonight Show 12 Days of Christmas Sweaters (the Radio City Rockettes do a surprise performance); Thank You Notes; Mike Birbiglia does jokes from his podcast; Robert Plant featuring Alison Krauss performed "Searching for My Love"
