= She's Fine (TV series) =

American comedy television series

- Genre: Comedy
- Created by: Liz Heldens; Matt Ward
- Starring: Elizabeth Banks; Ted Danson; Rob Delaney; Katey Sagal; Jared Goldstein; Spencer Moss
- Country of origin: United States
- Original language: English

Production
- Executive producers: Liz Heldens; Matt Ward; Elizabeth Banks; Jonathan Krisel; Max Handelman; Krissy Wall; Quinn Haberman; Jason Winer; Jon Radler
- Production companies: 20th Television; Brownstone Productions; Selfish Mermaids; Small Dog Picture Company

Original release
- Network: Apple TV

She's Fine is an upcoming comedy television series created and showrun by Liz Heldens and Matt Ward. It is starring Elizabeth Banks and Ted Danson. The series is scheduled to premiere on Apple TV on January 27, 2027.

== Cast ==
=== Main ===
- Elizabeth Banks as Heidi
- Ted Danson
- Rob Delaney
- Katey Sagal
- Jared Goldstein as Adam
- Spencer Moss as Riley

=== Recurring ===
- Hamish Linklater as Evan
- Michelle Buteau as Melissa
- Simu Liu as Dr. Zhou
- Titus Collier
- Thaddaeus Collier

=== Guest ===
- Tom Selleck

== Episodes ==
No.	Title	Directed by	Written by	Original release date
1	TBA	TBA	Liz Heldens & Matt Ward	January 27, 2027
2	TBA	TBA	Liz Heldens & Matt Ward	January 27, 2027
3	TBA	TBA	Alex Blagg	February 3, 2027
4	TBA	TBA	Sudi E. Green	February 10, 2027
5	TBA	TBA	Caroline Williams	February 17, 2027
6	TBA	TBA	Brian Ashburn	February 24, 2027
7	TBA	TBA	Shelly Gossman	March 3, 2027
8	TBA	TBA	Sabrina Wu	March 10, 2027
9	TBA	TBA	Alex Blagg & Juliette Strangio	March 17, 2027
10	TBA	TBA	Liz Heldens & Matt Ward	March 24, 2027

== Production ==
=== Development ===
The series is created by Liz Heldens and Matt Ward and has been in development for at least six months prior to receiving a series order from Apple TV in April 2026. It is produced by 20th Television and received a California tax credit for filming to take place in Los Angeles in 2026. Jonathan Krisel directed the pilot and is an executive producer. Executive producers on the series also include Elizabeth Banks, Max Handelman and Krissy Wall through Brownstone Productions, Quinn Haberman and Heldens for Selfish Mermaid, and Jason Winer and Jon Radler for Small Dog Picture Company. The series title was revealed to be She's Fine in November 2026.

=== Casting ===
The cast is led by Elizabeth Banks. Rob Delaney and Ted Danson joined the cast in May 2026 with Katey Sagal joining in June. Jared Goldstein, Spencer Moss, Hamish Linklater, Michelle Buteau and Simu Liu joined the cast in July. Tom Selleck joined the cast in a guest role in August 2026.

== Release ==
The series is scheduled to premiere on Apple TV on January 27, 2027.
