= Simu Liu =

Canadian actor (born 1989)

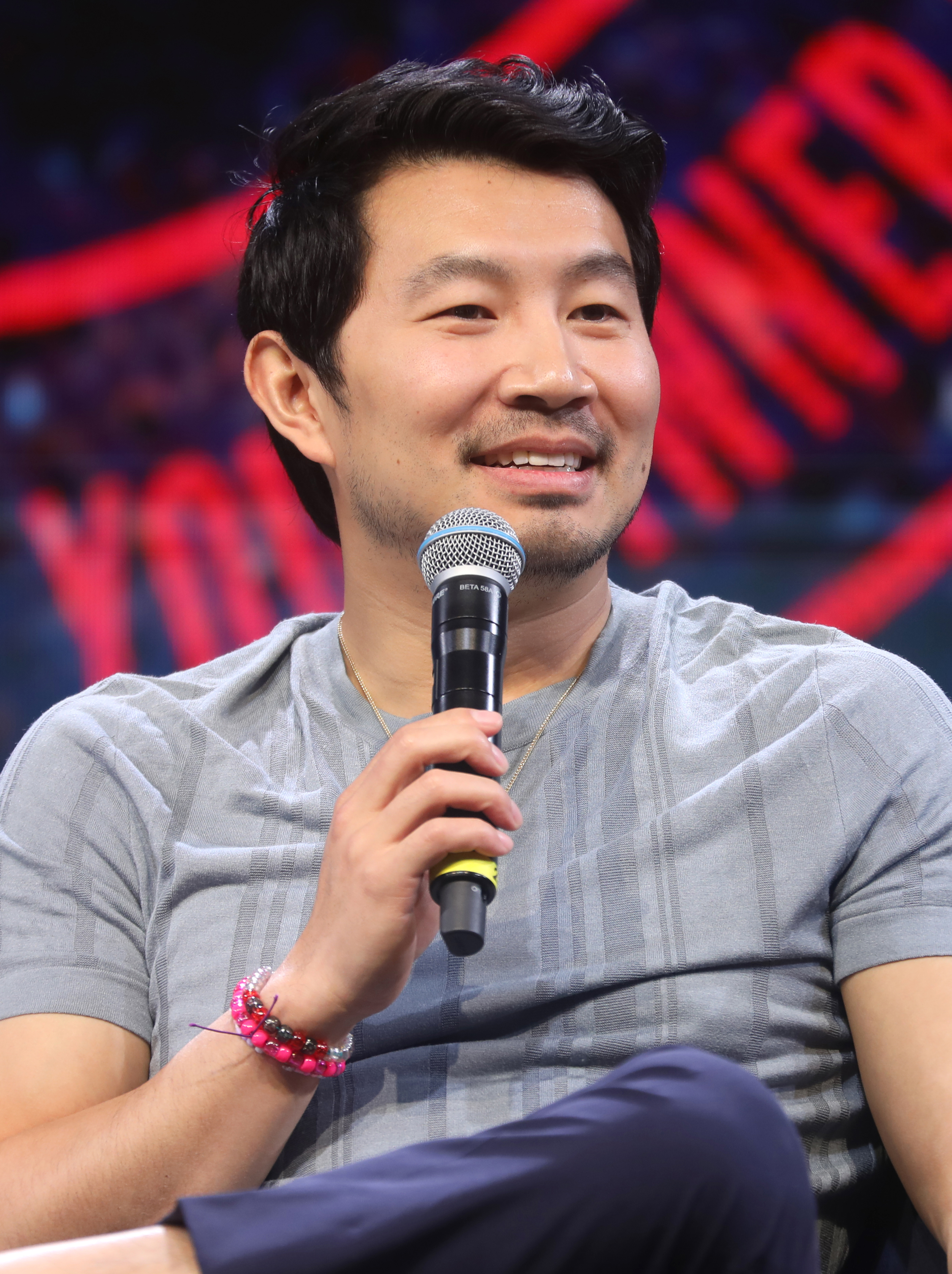
- Liu in 2024
- Born: 19 April 1989 (age 37); Harbin, Heilongjiang, China
- Citizenship: Canada
- Education: University of Western Ontario
- Occupations: Actor; author
- Years active: 2012–present
- Spouse: Allison Hsu (m. 2026)

Chinese name
- Simplified Chinese: 刘思慕
- Traditional Chinese: 劉思慕
Transcriptions
Standard Mandarin
- Hanyu Pinyin: Liú Sīmù
- IPA: [ljǒʊ sɹ̩́.mû]
Yue: Cantonese
- Jyutping: Lau4 Si1 Mou6
- IPA: [lɐw˩ si˥.mɔw˨]

Simu Liu (/ˈsiːmuː ˈliːjuː/ SEE-moo LEE-yoo; simplified Chinese: 刘思慕; traditional Chinese: 劉思慕; born 19 April 1989) is a Canadian actor. He rose to prominence by starring as Shang-Chi in the Marvel Cinematic Universe film Shang-Chi and the Legend of the Ten Rings (2021), a role which he will reprise in Avengers: Doomsday (2026).

Liu was born in Harbin, China, and raised in Ontario. He has also played Paul Xie in the Omni Television crime drama series Blood and Water—for which he was nominated for a Canadian Screen Award and an ACTRA Award—Jung Kim in the CBC Television sitcom Kim's Convenience (2016–2021), and one of the Ken dolls in the fantasy comedy film Barbie (2023). In 2022, Liu published the memoir We Were Dreamers and was named one of Time magazine's 100 most influential people in the world.

== Early life ==
Liu was born in Harbin, Heilongjiang, China, on 19 April 1989. His parents met while attending university in Beijing, where they both studied engineering. His father, Zhenning Liu, went to the United States to study for a PhD while his mother, Zheng Liu, worked in Beijing, and Liu was raised until age five by his grandparents in Harbin "in a small apartment, without running water for much of the day", in circumstances he recalled as "idyllic and happy". Liu later emigrated to rejoin his parents in Canada, who supplemented their scholarships with dish-washing jobs and eventually became successful aerospace engineers. He first arrived in Kingston, Ontario, where his father was fulfilling his doctoral studies at Queen's University. Liu was later raised in Mississauga, Ontario.

In his memoir, We Were Dreamers, Liu wrote of the deprivation and trauma his parents had experienced growing up in the Cultural Revolution, and their subsequent "tiger parenting" style, saying he felt they "wanted to rid [his] life of joy or happiness", and recalling "the weight of what he describes as impossible expectations, to be the star child, the studious academic, the obedient son", being "belittled and physically punished" for perceived failings. Liu's parents "hothoused him in maths at the age of five and set 'homework' that included reading biographies of scientists and studying algebra". Upon his arrival in Kingston, Liu attended Sydenham Public School. He later attended University of Toronto Schools and studied business administration at the University of Western Ontario's Ivey Business School.

Liu initially worked as an accountant at Deloitte but was laid off in April 2012 after nine months. He began to explore other career options and decided to pursue a career as an actor and stuntman. Familial relations worsened after he chose to pursue acting, with his parents excluding him from visiting other family members in China. In 2016, Liu and his parents began a successful reconciliation process, and he returned to China for a family visit nine years later, marking the first instance of such a visit since 2010.

== Career ==
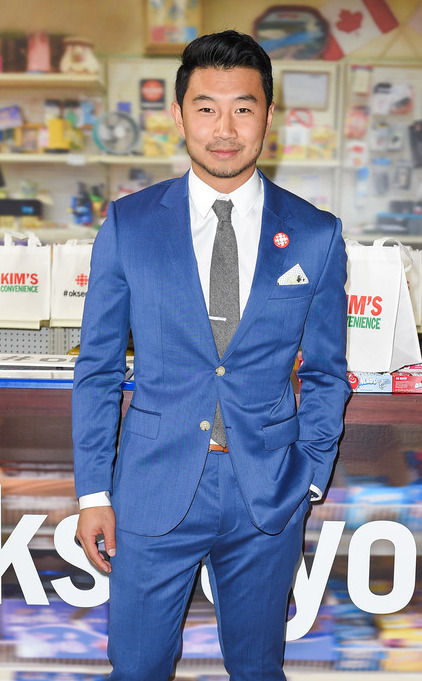
Liu in 2016

=== 2012–2018: Early work and television roles ===
Liu got his start in acting working as an extra and stuntman, appearing in movies and music videos such as Guillermo del Toro's Pacific Rim and Avicii's "I Could Be the One." His other early onscreen credits include Nikita (2012) and Beauty and the Beast (2014). He appeared as a stuntman in Sick: Survive the Night (2012) and the TV miniseries Heroes Reborn.

In 2015, Liu was cast in his first significant recurring role, appearing as a series regular in seven episodes of the Omni Television crime drama series Blood and Water (2015–2016). He would later receive his first award nominations for this role at the ACTRA Awards and Canadian Screen Awards in 2017.

Later in 2015, Liu was cast in his first main role as Jung Kim in the CBC Television sitcom Kim's Convenience, a TV adaptation of the play of the same name. It remains his most notable television success to date, with the series being nominated for and winning multiple awards internationally, including Best Comedy Series at the 2018 Canadian Screen Awards and "Most Popular Foreign Drama" at the 2019 Seoul International Drama Awards. Liu starred in the series until its conclusion in 2021.

In 2016, Liu was cast in a recurring role as the ex-CIA analyst Faaron, loosely modeled on real-life ex-analyst Rodney Faraon, in the NBC prequel series Taken based on the film franchise starring Liam Neeson. Even as he was cast in main and recurring roles, Liu continued to appear as an extra on several television shows, appearing in an episode of the hit BBC-Space series Orphan Black as well as in the Canadian science fiction series Dark Matter. In 2017, Liu appeared in the second season of Slasher as well as the CityTV miniseries Bad Blood, both as recurring characters. In 2018, he appeared in the science fiction television series The Expanse and Wong Fu Productions' YouTube series Yappie.

=== 2019–present: Recent work and Marvel Cinematic Universe ===
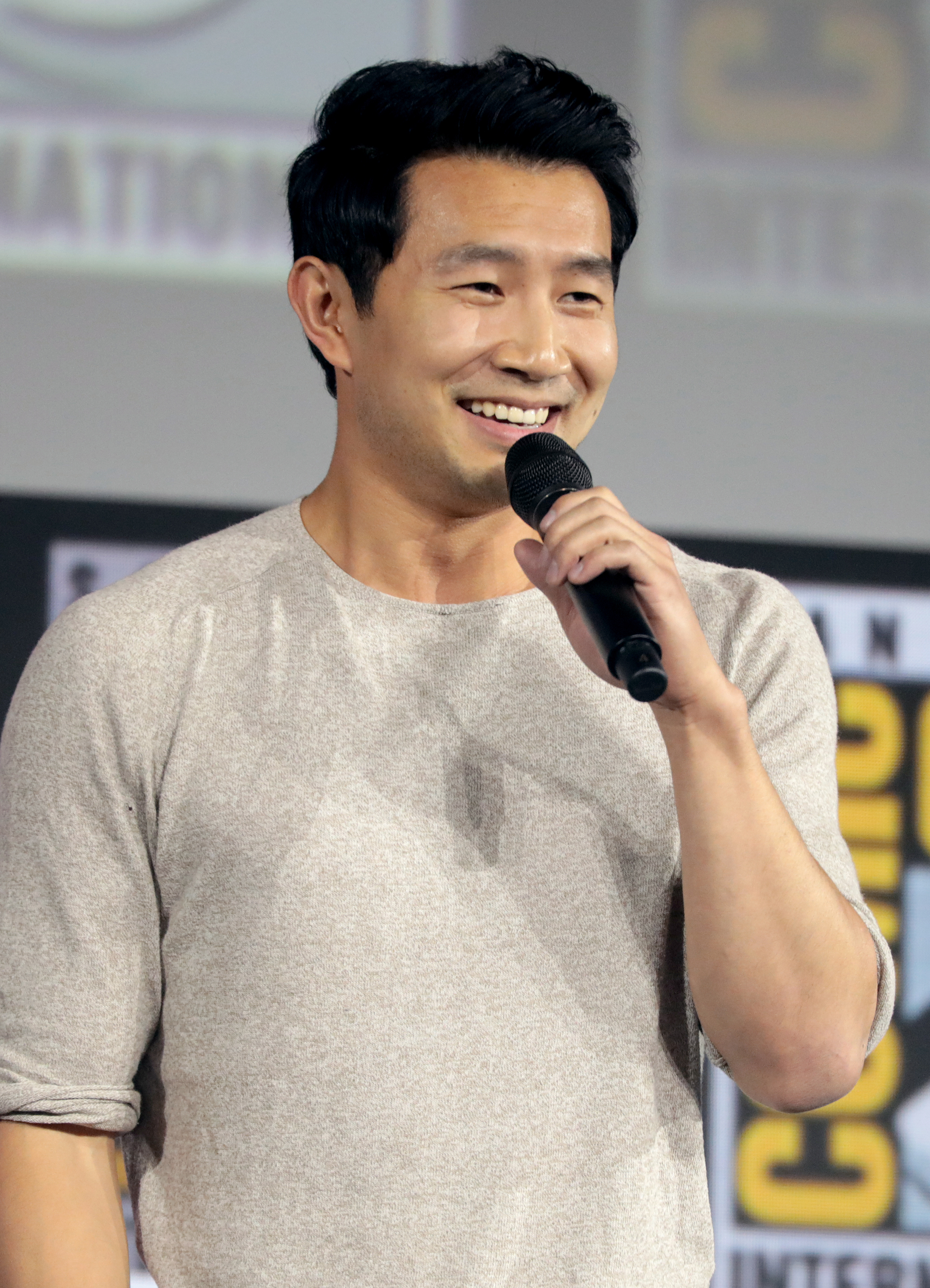
Liu at the 2019 San Diego Comic-Con

In early 2019, Liu guest-starred in the 100th episode of ABC's Fresh Off the Boat as a noodle vendor named Willie. He also guest-starred in an episode of the TV series Awkwafina Is Nora from Queens as Garbage Boy.

At Comic-Con 2019, Disney announced that Liu would play the titular superhero Shang-Chi in the film Shang-Chi and the Legend of the Ten Rings, which is set in the Marvel Cinematic Universe (MCU). Shang-Chi and the Legend of the Ten Rings is Marvel's first film with an Asian-led cast. Liu had asked about playing the role on Twitter in December 2018 when the movie was revealed to be in development. After several production and release delays due to the COVID-19 pandemic, the film was released in theaters on 3 September 2021, garnering positive critical reception and achieving commercial success. A sequel is planned. He reprised his role as the titular character in season three of the Disney+ series What If...? (2024) and the television series Marvel Zombies (2025). He’s set to return to the role in the upcoming MCU films Avengers: Doomsday (2026) and Avengers: Secret Wars (2027).

In September 2021, it was revealed that Liu will lead the English-language voice cast of Bright: Samurai Soul, a Netflix anime film which premiered on 12 October. In February 2022, Liu joined the cast of Greta Gerwig's Barbie film, as well as the thriller film Hello Stranger directed by April Mullen, which eventually became Simulant. Both films were released in 2023, with the former garnering acclaim and breaking box office records.

Both Liu and NBA player Jeremy Lin had guest appearances as caricaturized versions of themselves in Malaysian comedian Ronny Chieng's Netflix short Ronny Chieng Takes Chinatown (2022). In December 2022, Liu was a guest narrator at Disney's Candlelight Processional. On 7 April 2023, Liu released his debut single, titled "Don't". He was a guest dragon in season 19 of the Canadian reality series Dragons' Den.

In January 2025, Liu announced on Twitter that he was working to make a live action adaptation of Sleeping Dogs after a previous version starring Donnie Yen had been canceled. Shortly afterwards, it was reported that the film had entered pre-production with Liu expected to replace Yen as well as produce.

He was set to make his Broadway debut from February to April 2026 in Oh, Mary! as Mary’s Teacher replacing Cheyenne Jackson in the role at the Lyceum Theatre.

== Other work and public image ==
In 2014, Liu was paid $100 to model for a set of stock photos for FatCamera; the photos appeared in subway stations, advertisements, storefronts, pamphlets, and textbook covers. The photos received widespread media coverage upon Liu's mainstream acting breakthrough in 2021.

Liu is also a filmmaker, producer, and writer. Liu's first work in this area was Open Gym, a short film he wrote, directed, produced, and starred in that debuted at the 2013 Toronto Reel Asian International Film Festival. He has directed, produced, and written several other shorts, including Crimson Defender vs. The Slightly Racist Family (2015). In 2016, Liu helped write Blood and Water, during which he helped break the story for the show and wrote an episode for its second season. In 2017, Liu worked with Wong Fu Productions on their short Meeting Mommy (2017), which he wrote and produced with Tina Jung. It was released in February 2018 on the Wong Fu Productions YouTube channel. In 2018, he founded his own film production company, 4:12 Entertainment, and began developing long-form film projects under it.

In December 2017, Liu wrote for Maclean's magazine about his experiences growing up in an immigrant family. The article appeared in the January 2018 issue. His memoir, We Were Dreamers: An Immigrant Superhero Origin Story, was published by HarperCollins on 17 May 2022. In March 2021, Liu published a column in Variety detailing the effects of Asian hate crimes and how "rhetoric like 'the China virus' encourages hate toward all Asian people—not just Chinese."

Liu was included on Time magazine's annual list of the 100 most influential people in the world (in the "Artists" section) in 2022. Liu was named one of Hello!'s 50 Most Beautiful Canadians and 25 Hottest Bachelors in 2017 and 2018. In May 2021, Liu became the first East Asian man to cover Men's Health magazine in over a decade since Jet Li in 2010. In November 2021, Liu became the fourth actor of Chinese descent to host Saturday Night Live. He has previously hosted the Juno Awards of 2022 and the Juno Awards of 2023.

In October 2020, Liu became a UNICEF Canada Ambassador and has since appeared in every Youth Advocacy Summit hosted by UNICEF Canada. In 2023, Liu made an appearance despite having torn his Achilles tendon.

In 2023, Liu joined MìLà as its chief content officer. MìLà is a direct-to-consumer soup dumpling company that is based in Bellevue, WA.

== Accolades ==
Liu was nominated for a Canadian Screen Award and an ACTRA Award in 2017 for his work in Blood and Water. He, along with his Kim's Convenience castmates, won the ACTRA Award for Outstanding Ensemble in 2017. Liu and his castmates were nominated for the same award in 2018 and 2019. Kim's Convenience also won the award for Best Comedy Series at the 2018 Canadian Screen Awards.

On stage, Liu was nominated for a Dora Mavor Moore Award in the Outstanding Ensemble category alongside his castmates in the 2016 Factory Theatre remount of the play Banana Boys.

In January 2023, he was named the winner of the Academy of Canadian Cinema and Television's Radius Award at the 11th Canadian Screen Awards. He also won the Canadian Screen Award for Best Host in a Live Entertainment Special for the 2022 Juno Awards.

== Personal life ==
In 2022, Liu began dating digital marketing manager Allison Hsu. The couple became engaged in May 2025 and married in France in October 2026.

== Filmography ==
=== Film ===
Key
†	Denotes films that have not yet been released

Year	Title	Role	Notes
2013	Pacific Rim	Pedestrian	Uncredited extra
2015	Antisocial 2	Male Nurse	
2021	Women Is Losers	Gilbert	
2021	Shang-Chi and the Legend of the Ten Rings	Shaun / Shang-Chi	
2021	Bright: Samurai Soul	Izno (voice)	English dub
2023	One True Loves	Sam	
2023	Simulant	Casey	
2023	Barbie	Rival Ken	
2024	Arthur the King	Leo	
2024	Atlas	Harlan Shepherd	
2024	Jackpot!	Louis Lewis	
2025	Last Breath	David Yuasa	
2025	In Your Dreams	Michael Ting (voice)	
2026	Avengers: Doomsday †	Shang-Chi	Post-production
TBA	Homewrecker †	TBA	Post-production

=== Television ===
Year	Title	Role	Notes
2013	Warehouse 13	Bartender	Episode: "Secret Services"
2013	Played	Gunman	Episode: "Made – Daniel"
2013	Mayday	Narita Air Traffic Controller	Episode: "The Final Push"
2014	Beauty and the Beast	EMT	Episode: "Both Sides Now"
2015	Blood and Water	Paul Xie	Main role
2015	Make It Pop!	Randy	Episode: "Rumors and Roommates"
2016	Taken	Faaron	Recurring role; season 1
2016–2021	Kim's Convenience	Jung Kim	Main role
2017	Orphan Black	Mr. Mitchell	Episode: "Clutch of Greed"
2017	Dark Matter	Technician	Episode: "Nowhere To Go"
2017	Slasher: Guilty Party	Luke	2 episodes
2017	Bad Blood	Guy	3 episodes
2018	The Expanse	Lt. Paolo Mayer	Episode: "Dandelion Sky"
2018	Yappie	Tom	Main role
2019	Fresh Off the Boat	Willie	Episode: "Under the Taipei Sun"
2020	Awkwafina Is Nora from Queens	Garbage Boy	Episode: "Grandma & Chill"
2021	Corner Gas Animated	Gerald Mesmerizer (voice)	Episode: "The Fresh Prints of Bell Heir"
2021; 2025	Star Wars: Visions	Lah Zhima (voice)	2 episodes; English language dub
2021	The Tonight Show Starring Jimmy Fallon	Himself (guest)	Episode: 10 September 2021
2021	Selling Sunset	Himself (guest)	Episode: "A House For A Hero"
2021	Saturday Night Live	Himself (host)	Episode: "Simu Liu/Saweetie"
2021	Marvel Studios: Assembled	Himself	Episode: The Making of Shang-Chi and the Legend of the Ten Rings
2022	Celebrity Jeopardy!	Himself (contestant)	2 episodes
2022	The Simpsons	Adult Hubert Wong (voice)	Episode: "When Nelson Met Lisa"
2022	Running Wild with Bear Grylls	Himself	Episode: "Simu Liu"
2023	The Other Two	Himself	Episode: "Cary Gets His Ass Handed to Him"
2023	StoryBots: Answer Time	Socradamus	Episode: "Elements"
2024	Dragons' Den	Himself	Season 19
2024	Gremlins	Chang	Voice
2024	Laid	Philippe	Episode: "Sex Cluster"
2024	What If...?	Shang-Chi (voice)	2 episodes
2025	Got to Get Out	Himself (host)	Main role
2025	Rise Up, Sing Out	Himself (voice)	Episode: "Lunar New Year"
2025	Invincible	Multi-Paul / Paul Cha	Voice; 3 episodes
2025	Marvel Zombies	Shang-Chi (voice)	3 episodes
2025	The Copenhagen Test	Alexander Hale	Main role; Also; executive producer
2026	Star Wars: Visions Presents – The Ninth Jedi	Lah Zhima (voice)	English language dub
2026	Phineas and Ferb	Professor Lem Enall (voice)	Episode: "Terrors of the AltSpace"
2027	She's Fine †	Dr. Zhou	Upcoming series; recurring role

=== Music videos ===
Year	Title	Artist(s)	Role	Ref.
2012	"I Could Be The One"	Avicii & Nicky Romero	Office Worker	
2015	"The Filth"	Dream Jefferson	Gangster/Stunt Coordinator	
2021	"Run It"	DJ Snake ft. Rick Ross & Rich Brian	Himself	

=== Games ===
Year	Title	Role	Ref.
2024	Stormgate	Warz	

=== Web series ===
Year	Title	Role	Notes
2014	Out with Dad	Waiter	2 episodes

=== Stage ===
Year	Title	Role	Venue	Notes	Ref.
2026	Oh, Mary!	Mary's Teacher	Lyceum Theatre	Broadway	

== Discography ==
=== Extended plays ===
List of EPs, with selected details
Title	Details
Anxious-Avoidant	Released: 17 November 2023; Label: Markham Valley; Format: Digital download, streaming

=== Singles ===
List of singles, showing year released and album name
Title	Year	Album
"Don't"	2023	Anxious-Avoidant
"If It's Time"	2023	Anxious-Avoidant

== Awards and nominations ==
Year	Nominated work	Award	Category	Result	Ref
2017	Blood and Water	ACTRA Awards	Outstanding Performance – Male	Nominated	
2017	Blood and Water	Canadian Screen Award	Best Supporting Actor in a Dramatic Program or Series	Nominated	
2017	Kim's Convenience	ACTRA Awards 2017	Outstanding Performance – Ensemble	Won	
2018	Kim's Convenience	ACTRA Awards 2018	Outstanding Performance – Ensemble	Nominated	
2021	Shang-Chi and the Legend of the Ten Rings	People's Choice Awards	The Male Movie Star of 2021	Nominated	
2021	Shang-Chi and the Legend of the Ten Rings	People's Choice Awards	The Action Movie Star of 2021	Won	
2021	Shang-Chi and the Legend of the Ten Rings	Unforgettable Gala – Asian American Awards	Breakout Actor on Film	Won	
2022	Shang-Chi and the Legend of the Ten Rings	Hollywood Critics Association Film Awards	Game Changer Award	Won	
2022	Shang-Chi and the Legend of the Ten Rings	Critics' Choice Super Awards	Best Actor in a Superhero Movie	Nominated	
2022	Kim's Convenience	Canadian Screen Award	Best Lead Actor, Comedy	Nominated	
2022	Shang-Chi and the Legend of the Ten Rings	MTV Movie & TV Awards	Best Hero	Nominated	
2022	Shang-Chi and the Legend of the Ten Rings	Saturn Awards	Best Actor in a Film	Nominated	
2023	Himself	Canadian Screen Award	Radius Award	Honoured	
2023	Juno Awards of 2023 (as host)	Canadian Screen Award	Host, live entertainment special	Won	
2023	Simu Liu, Luciano Casimiri, Leonard Chan, Julie Kim and Kristeen Von Hagen, Juno Awards of 2022 (as writer)	Canadian Screen Award	Variety or sketch comedy	Nominated	
