= Bang (Rita Ora and Imanbek EP) =

EP by Rita Ora and Imanbek
- Released: 12 February 2021
- Recorded: 2020 – 2021
- Genres: Club; dance; house; pop
- Length: 11:24
- Labels: Atlantic; Warner; What a DJ
- Producers: Rita Ora; Imanbek; David Guetta; Gia Koka; Jeremia Jones; Joe Hike; Matt Waro; Mike Hawkins; Morgan Avenue; Sam Martin; Sergio Kitchens; Toby Green; William Spencer Bastian

Rita Ora chronology
Phoenix (2018)	Bang (2021)	You & I (2023)

Imanbek chronology
Bang (2021)

Singles from Bang
- 1. "Big" Released: 12 February 2021

Bang is a collaborative extended play (EP) by British singer Rita Ora and Kazakh producer Imanbek. The record was released for digital download and streaming in various countries by Atlantic, Warner and What a DJ on 12 February 2021. Created amidst the pandemic of COVID-19, it incorporates various genres of club, dance, house and pop with 1980s and 1990s influences.

Bang was promoted with the release of a single, "Big", and a film shot in Bulgaria as a tribute to Ora's Albanian and Imanbek's Kazakh heritages. Following its release, it was met with a warm reception from music critics for the collaboration between the artists, its mainstream appeal and production. Commercially, the record reached number 16 on the US Top Dance/Electronic Albums chart.

== Background and composition ==
On 4 February 2021, Ora and Imanbek announced the forthcoming release of their collaborative extended play entitled Bang. The artists confirmed its release date and track listing through an image uploaded on their social media that showcased the involved collaborators. The record was created remotely using the American software Zoom amidst the pandemic of COVID-19, with the aim of establishing creative connections with artists from around the world. Despite jointly writing all four songs, it took Ora and Imanbek eight months to complete the creation process of the record. Ora stated that "it's amazing how much technology allowed our connection to shine through [...] and this EP is proof that creative process has the power to transcend any obstacle that separates us". Imanbek further elaborated on the process that "[It] brought us together not only creatively but personally and that was a great experience". Atlantic, Warner and What a DJ ultimately released the record for digital download and streaming in various countries on the scheduled date of 12 February 2021. Additionally, an acoustic version of it was simultaneously introduced on the same date.

With a running time of 11 minutes and 24 seconds, Bang explores various genres of club, dance, house and pop with the incorporation of sounds from the 1980s and 1990s. For the record, Ora and Imanbek collaborated with several composers, including Alexander Eskeerdo Izquierdo, Gia Koka, Mike Hawkins, Sam Martin, Toby Green and William Spencer Bastian. It opens with "Big" featuring American rapper Gunna, which was created by Ora and Imanbek in partnership with British singer Ed Sheeran and French disc jockey David Guetta. Classified as a dance, electronic dance music (EDM), electropop, hip hop and house song, it commemorates the moment of having a good time. The record progresses with the second song "Bang Bang", which samples German producer Harold Faltermeyer's single "Axel F" (1985). Designated as an EDM song with a club energy and house notes, the song explores a dangerous and seductive love, that brings trouble. A song featuring English and Spanish lyrics, "Mood" is the third song on the record and features Argentine rapper Khea. The song combines elements of dance and hip hop with a rhythmic and upbeat funky instrumental. The record ends with the fourth song "The One", which comprises house, pop and trap music accompanied with dance basslines and dark influences.

== Reception and promotion ==
Professional ratings
Review scores
Source	Rating
Mix1	7/8 stars

Following its release, Bang was met with a warm reception from music critics. Designating it as a "star-studded EP", Farrell Sweeney from Dancing Astronaut acknowledged that each song on the record boasts its "own unique capacity for mainstream appeal" and distinguished "Big" as its "radio favorite". Similarly, Ryan Ford for We Rave You described the record as a "club-ready EP" possessing "four deliciously unique singles". He further emphasised "The One" as a positive conclusion to what he labelled as a "superb EP", also highlighting Ora's "vocal talents" and the duo's "impressive" mainstream appeal. Selene Moral of Los 40 commented that "we find pop sounds [in the EP] that take us to the club culture of the [80s and 90s] and a flavor of house music". According to a review by the editorial staff of Mix1, the record is a "remarkable compilation of songs" that incorporates several musical genres. Furthermore, the latter staff awarded the song a favourable rating of 7 out of 8 stars. Commercially, Bang reached number 16 on the US Billboard Top Dance/Electronic Albums ranking.

To accompany the release, a four-minute and 50-second lasting film for Bang premiered to Ora's official YouTube channel on 12 February 2021, incorporating a snippet from each song as an introduction to the record. On the same occasion, "Big" and its accompanying music video were released as the record's lead single. Directed by Jasmine Loignon, the scenes were filmed at the mount of Buzludzha and the cities of Pernik and Sofia in Bulgaria. The visuals pay tribute to Ora's Albanian and Imanbek's Kazakh heritages. In it, the singer wears a traditional Albanian attire created by Kosovo-Albanian designer Valdrin Sahiti, which was aimed to display the Albanian ethnographic style, as intended by her. For further promotion, Ora performed "Bang Bang" for the first time in the eighth season of the American talk show The Tonight Show Starring Jimmy Fallon on 3 March 2021. A day later, the singer went on to perform the song on Australian breakfast show Sunrise.

== Track listing ==
Credits and tracklist adapted from Spotify.

Bang
No.	Title	Writer(s)	Producer(s)	Length
1.	"Big" (with David Guetta featuring Gunna)	Rita Ora; Imanbek; David Guetta; Alexander Eskeerdo Izquierdo; Ed Sheeran; Marcus Lomax; Mike Hawkins; Sam Martin; Sergio Kitchens; Toby Green; William Spencer Bastian	Imanbek; David Guetta; Mike Hawkins; Sam Martin; Sergio Kitchens; Toby Green; William Spencer Bastian	2:36
2.	"Bang Bang"	Rita Ora; Imanbek; Gia Koka; Harold Faltermeyer	Imanbek; Gia Koka; Joe Hike; Matt Waro	2:59
3.	"Mood" (featuring Khea)	Rita Ora; Imanbek; Anthony Libet; Gia Koka; Jeremia Jones; Jonathan Latorre; Lino Brownski; Morgan Avenue; Taoufik Korriche	Imanbek; Gia Koka; Jeremia Jones; Morgan Avenue	3:24
4.	"The One"	Rita Ora; Imanbek; Caroline Ailin; Frederik Castenschiold Eichen; Kirill Lupinos; Koda; Marwen Tlili	Imanbek	2:25
Total length:				11:24

Bang – Acoustic
No.	Title	Writer(s)	Producer(s)	Length
1.	"Bang Bang"	Rita Ora; Imanbek; Gia Koka; Harold Faltermeyer	Guy Langley; Lael Goldberg	3:05
2.	"Mood" (featuring Khea)	Rita Ora; Imanbek; Anthony Libet; Gia Koka; Jeremia Jones; Jonathan Latorre; Lino Brownski; Morgan Avenue; Taoufik Korriche	Guy Langley; Lael Goldberg	3:23
3.	"The One"	Rita Ora; Imanbek; Caroline Ailin; Frederik Castenschiold Eichen; Kirill Lupinos; Koda; Marwen Tlili	Guy Langley; Lael Goldberg	3:04
4.	"Big"	Rita Ora; Imanbek; David Guetta; Alexander Eskeerdo Izquierdo; Ed Sheeran; Marcus Lomax; Mike Hawkins; Sam Martin; Sergio Kitchens; Toby Green; William Spencer Bastian	Guy Langley; Lael Goldberg	2:39
Total length:				12:13

== Charts ==
Chart performance for Bang
Chart (2021)	Peak position
US Top Dance Albums (Billboard)	16

== Release history ==
Release dates and formats for Bang
Region	Date	Format(s)	Version	Label(s)	Ref.
Various	12 February 2021	Digital download; streaming	Standard	Atlantic; Warner; What a DJ	
Various	12 February 2021	Digital download; streaming	Acoustic	Atlantic; Warner; What a DJ	
