= All Natural =

Single by Rita Ora
- Released: 24 September 2025; 7 November 2025 (Remix)
- Genre: Electropop
- Length: 3:02
- Label: BMG
- Songwriters: Joel Little; Sammy Witte; Casey Smith
- Producer: Joel Little

Rita Ora singles chronology
"Joy" (2025)	"All Natural" (2025)	"If It’s Not Love" (2026)

Music video
- "All Natural" on YouTube

"All Natural" is a song by British singer Rita Ora. BMG released it on 24 September 2025. It was promoted by a music video directed by Taika Waititi, and a remix with Kosovar singer-songwriter, Yll Limani.

== Background and release ==
Prior to the release of "All Natural", Rita Ora released two singles in 2025, "Heat" and "Joy". Ora described the song as "one of the most personal songs [she has] ever made." She stated that it is "really about growth, healing, and self-discovery", adding that she hoped listeners would hear it and connect with it through their own journeys.

The song was officially released on 24 September 2025, followed by a remix featuring Kosovar singer and songwriter Yll Limani on 7 November 2025.

== Composition ==
The single was written by Sammy Witte, Casey Smith, and Joel Little, with production handled by the latter. Critics described the song's sound as "sultry" and "electro-pop". In the song’s press release, Ora shared her thoughts on the creative process and the meaning of the track, stating:

For me, it’s about learning to love every side of yourself — the strong and the fragile, the light and the shadows. Working with Joel [Little] was such a gift; he has this rare ability to take something deeply intimate and turn it into music that everyone can feel as their own.

— Ora for the single press release, via Rolling Stone Australia

== Reception ==
"All Natural" was met with positive reviews from music critics. Music and Gigs described the song as a "sleek and seductive", noticing that "it's the kind of track that feels intimate but cinematic". Writing for 360 Magazine, Vaughn Lowery praised the fusion of Ora’s stripped-back vocal performance with Little's "glassy synths and shadowy production", commenting that it "crystallized into a confident reflection of strength and sensuality". ThatGrapeJuice dubbed the track as "hypnotic". While music critic Eric Alper praised Ora for "embracing vulnerability and strength in equal measure."

== Music video ==
A music video directed by Taika Waititi was released alongside the single. Waititi, a filmmaker and the singer’s husband, had previously directed other music videos for her, he described the making of the video as "a dream thing to do".

"I’m not even sure I could call it work, it’s literally pointing a camera at your best friend who happens to be criminally gorgeous and effortlessly talented. I mean, I wasn’t even operating the camera, I just told the guy where to point it. And all the while we got to listen to this absolute gem of a song. It’s actually a dream thing to do."

— Taika Waititi on working with Ora to, The Independent

== Track listing ==
- Digital download and streaming
1. "All Natural" – 3:02
2. "Heat" – 3:02
- Digital download and streaming — Remix
1. "All Natural" (Yll Limani Remix) – 3:02

== Personnel ==
Credits adapted from Tidal.

- Rita Ora — vocalist, background vocalist
- Joel Little — producer, composer, author, drum programmer, keyboard, recording engineer, mixing engineer
- Casey Smith — composer, background vocalist, author
- Sammy Witte — composer, author, co-producer, drum programmer, keyboard

Remix

- Rita Ora — vocalist, background vocalist
- Yll Limani — vocalist, composer, author
- Joel Little — producer, composer, author, drum programmer, keyboard, recording engineer, mixing engineer
- Denis Haxhimehmeti — composer, author
- Fatjon Miftaraj — composer, author
- Casey Smith — composer, background vocalist, author
- Sammy Witte — composer, author, co-producer, drum programmer, keyboard
- Guy Massey — mastering engineer, mixing engineer

== Charts ==
Chart performance
Chart (2026)	Peak position
Nicaragua Anglo Airplay (Monitor Latino)	4

== Release history ==
"All Natural" release history
Region	Date	Format(s)	Label	Edition	Ref.
Various	24 September 2025	Digital download; streaming	BMG Rights Management UK	Original	
Italy	26 September 2025	Radio airplay	BMG Rights Management UK	Original	
Various	7 November 2025	Digital download; streaming	BMG Rights Management UK	Yll Limani Remix	
