= Imanbek =

Kazakh record producer (born 2000)

Imanbek Иманбек
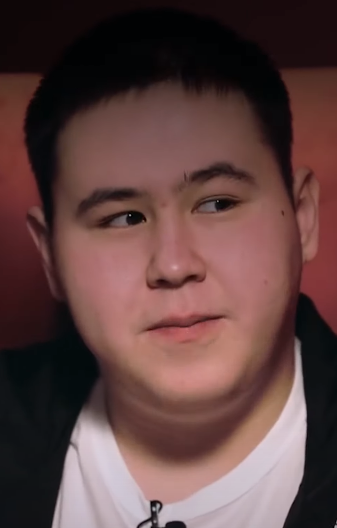
- Imanbek in 2021

Background information
- Born: İmanbek Maratūly Zeikenov; 21 October 2000 (age 26); Aksu, Kazakhstan
- Genres: Slap house; deep house; EDM; trap; Moombahton
- Occupations: DJ; record producer
- Years active: 2019–present
- Labels: Virgin; Effective yea
- Website: imanbekmusic.com

İmanbek Maratūly Zeikenov (Kazakh: Иманбек Маратұлы Зейкенов [əjmɑnbʲek zʲejkʲenəf]; born 21 October 2000), known professionally as Imanbek, is a Kazakh DJ and record producer. In 2019, he became known for his remix of Saint Jhn's "Roses". In 2021, Imanbek won a Grammy for his remix of "Roses", becoming the first Grammy recipient from Kazakhstan, and the first Grammy award winner in a non-classical category from within the CIS.

== Career ==
Born in Kazakhstan, he comes from Aksu and has played the guitar since the age of 8. He studied and worked in rail transport (at one point he worked at the Aksu railway station), but has been engaged in music production since 2017.

His remix of "Roses" by Guyanese-American rapper Saint Jhn brought him international attention. The remix was done without Saint Jhn's involvement as Zeikenov's attempts to contact him on Instagram failed and he did not receive a reply. Based on the success and popularity of the remix, the original song recorded in 2016 appeared on the US Billboard chart, the UK Singles Chart and other charts in Austria, Canada, Denmark, France, Germany, and Ireland in 2019. He has signed with the Russian label Effective Records and released his first song on KSHMR's label Dharma Worldwide, a sublabel of Spinnin Records. On 24 November 2020, he was nominated for a Grammy Award in the category of Best Remixed Recording for his remix of Saint Jhn's Roses.

On 12 February 2021, Imanbek released Bang, a collaborative 4-track extended play (EP) with English singer Rita Ora. It was released simultaneously alongside its lead single "Big" with French DJ David Guetta and featuring American rapper Gunna. Argentine trap artist Khea features on the song "Mood" which also appears on the EP.

On 15 March 2021, Imanbek won a Grammy for his remix of "Roses", becoming the first person from Kazakhstan to win a Grammy.

In May 2021, Imanbek won the 2021 Billboard Music Award for Top Dance/Electronic Song. He received the award for his remix “Roses” originally released by Saint Jhn in 2016.

On 11 June 2021, Imanbek released his new song "Sweet Dreams" with Norwegian DJ and record producer Alan Walker. The music video was uploaded to Alan Walker's official channel. The music video currently has 24 million views. He released a remix contest of Sweet Dreams in partnership with the digital workstation, FL Studio and Alan Walker.

== Discography ==
=== Extended plays ===
Title	Extended play details
Bang (with Rita Ora)	Released: 12 February 2021; Labels: Asylum, Atlantic; Formats: Digital download, streaming

=== Singles ===
Title	Year	Peak chart positions										Certifications	Album
Title	Year	CIS	AUS	GER	ITA	NLD	NZ	SWE	SWI	UK	US	Certifications	Album
"Roses" (Imanbek remix) (with Saint Jhn)	2019	2	1	3	4	1	1	4	2	1	4	RIAA: 3× Platinum; ARIA: 3× Platinum; BPI: Platinum; BVMI: Diamond; IFPI DEN: Platinum; RMNZ: 2× Platinum; SNEP: Diamond	While the World Was Burning
"I'm Just Feelin' (Du Du Du)" (with Martin Jensen)	2020	24	—	—	—	—	—	99	—	—	—		Non-album singles
"Brother Louie" (with Vize and Dieter Bohlen featuring Leony)	2020	—	—	64	—	—	—	—	—	—	—		Non-album singles
"Blackout" (featuring Tory Lanez)	2020	—	—	—	—	—	—	—	—	—	—		Non-album singles
"Too Much" (with Marshmello featuring Usher)	2020	7	—	—	—	—	—	— (Note: "Too Much" did not enter the Swedish Singles Chart, but peaked at number 17 on the Swedish Heatseeker chart.)	—	—	—		Non-album singles
"Kill Me Better" (with Don Diablo featuring Trevor Daniel)	2020	—	—	—	—	—	—	—	—	—	—		Forever
"Goodbye" (with Goodboys)	2020	124	—	—	—	—	— (Note: "Goodbye" did not enter the NZ Top 40 Singles Chart, but peaked at number 34 on the NZ Hot Singles Chart.)	—	—	59	—		Non-album single
"Big" (with Rita Ora and David Guetta featuring Gunna)	2021	—	—	95	—	—	— (Note: "Big" did not enter the NZ Top 40 Singles Chart, but peaked at number 16 on the NZ Hot Singles Chart.)	— (Note: "Big" did not enter the Swedish Singellista Chart, but peaked at number one on the Swedish Heatseeker Chart.)	68	53	—		Bang
"Bang Bang" (with Rita Ora)	2021	13	—	—	—	—	— (Note: "Bang Bang" did not enter the NZ Top 40 Singles Chart, but peaked at number 6 on the NZ Hot Singles Chart.)	—	—	—			Bang
"Leck" (with Morgenshtern and Fetty Wap featuring Kddk)	2021	—	—	—	—	—	—	—	—	—	—		Non-album singles
"Dancing on Dangerous" (with Sean Paul featuring Sofia Reyes)	2021	17	—	—	37	44	—	—	90	—	—	FIMI: Platinum	Non-album singles
"Baddest" (with Cher Lloyd)	2021	— (Note: "Baddest" did not reach the top 200 of the TopHit chart, but peaked at number 927 on the chart.)	—	—	—	—	—	—	—	—	—		Non-album singles
"Sweet Dreams" (with Alan Walker)	2021	40	—	—	—	—	—	—	—	—	—	FIMI: Gold	Walker Racing League
"Fighter" (with LP)	2021	49	—	—	—	—	—	—	—	—	—		Non-album singles
"Runaway" (with Hollywood Undead)	2021	—	—	—	—	—	—	—	—	—	—		Non-album singles
"Go Crazy" (with Lil Xan and Kddk)	2021	—	—	—	—	—	—	—	—	—	—		Non-album singles
"Ordinary Life" (with Wiz Khalifa and Kddk featuring Kiddo)	2022	—	—	—	—	—	—	—	—	—	—		Non-album singles
"Belly Dancer" (with Byor)	2022	—	—	7	—	12	—	92	16	—	—	RIAA: Gold; BPI: Silver; BVMI: Platinum; FIMI: Platinum; RMNZ: Gold	Non-album singles
"Ocean of Tears" (with Dvbbs)	2022	—	—	—	—	—	—	—	—	—	—		Non-album singles
"Fake" (with Crazy Donkey and Brando featuring Paradigm)	2023	—	—	—	—	—	—	—	—	—	—		Non-album singles
"Sunglasses" (with Baby B3ns)	2023	—	—	—	—	—	—	—	—	—	—		Non-album singles
"No Sleep"	2023	—	—	—	—	—	—	—	—	—	—		Non-album singles
"—" denotes items which were not released in that country or failed to chart.

=== Other releases ===
Imanbek has a number of other releases, most notably:

- "Valentino" (with 24kGoldn)
- "SAD" (with Rasster)
- "Take Me" (with O'Neill)
- "Hot" (with Parah Dice)
- "Smoke It Up" (with Stephanskiy)
- "Dope"
- "Clandestina" (with Filv and Edmofo featuring Emma Peters)
- "Voyage, Voyage" (with Duboss)
- "Romantic Dance" (with DJ Dmimixer featuring Murana)
- "Summertime Sadness"
- "Hey Baby" (with Afrojack featuring Gia Koka)
- "Bam" (with Kddk and Ya Rick)

== Awards and nominations ==
Award	Year	Nominee(s)	Category	Result	Ref.
Grammy Awards	2021	"Roses" (Imanbek Remix)	Best Remixed Recording	Won	
UK Music Video Awards	2021	"Goodbye" (with Goodboys)	Best Dance/Electronic Video - UK	Nominated	
