= How to Be Lonely =

Single by Rita Ora
- Released: 13 March 2020
- Genre: Pop
- Length: 2:55
- Label: Atlantic
- Songwriters: Lewis Capaldi; Peter Rycroft; Thomas Mann
- Producer: aboutagirl

Rita Ora singles chronology
"Ritual" (2019)	"How to Be Lonely" (2020)	"Big" (2021)

"How to Be Lonely" is a song by British singer Rita Ora released as a single through Atlantic Records UK on 13 March 2020.

== Composition ==
"How to Be Lonely" is a mid-tempo ballad that deals with themes about "battling insecurity".

== Critical reception ==
Mike Wass of Idolator wrote that the song is a "nice way to kick off an era" that "does showcase the 'Anywhere' singer's powerful pipes and growth as an artist". Rob Copsey of the Official Charts Company wrote that the song features "opening guitar strums[,] Coldplay-sized chantalong chorus [and] catchy finger snaps, punchy electronic beats and some killer adlibs", concluding that Ora's "take on ugly crying powerhouse pop is masterfully done".

== Music video ==
In the music video, directed by Dave Meyers, Ora is in an empty room alone and then alone with a lot of people. An arrow hits her. In the next scene, she is walking in a room filled with eggshells. Then, she is dancing with a skeleton and a bear hugs her. After that, she falls into the sky. Then she smashes a wall with a baseball bat. A UFO lands.

== Live performances ==
Ora performed the song live at BBC's Sport Relief 2020 telethon on 13 March.

== Track listings ==
Digital download / streaming

1. "How to Be Lonely" – 2:55

Digital download / streaming - Live from London

1. "How to Be Lonely" (Live from London) – 2:56

Digital download / streaming - MÖWE Remix

1. "How to Be Lonely" (MÖWE Remix) – 2:54

Digital download / streaming - aboutagirl Remix

1. "How to Be Lonely" (aboutagirl Remix) – 3:23

Digital download / streaming - LARI LUKE Remix

1. "How to Be Lonely" (LARI LUKE Remix) – 3:21

Digital download / streaming - Sam Feldt Remix

1. "How to Be Lonely" (Sam Feldt Remix) – 3:11

Digital download / streaming - Bomba Estéreo Remix Remix

1. "How to Be Lonely" (Bomba Estéreo Remix) – 2:50

== Personnel ==
Credits adapted from Tidal.

- Rita Ora - vocals
- Lostboy – producer
- Tom Mann - producer, background vocals, bass, drums, guitar, keyboard, programming, synthesizer, vocal production, writer
- aboutagirl - producer
- Siba - additional producer
- Amanda Merdzan - assistant engineer
- Matt Wolach - assistant mix engineer
- Michael Freeman - assistant mix engineer
- Lewis Capaldi - songwriter, background vocals, guitar
- Mark "Spike" Stent - mastering, mixing
- Stuart Hawkes - mastering
- Cameron Gower Pool - vocal production
- Peter Rycroft - writer

== Charts ==
Chart (2020)	Peak position
Australia Airplay (Radiomonitor)	32
Belgium (Ultratip Bubbling Under Flanders)	4
Croatia (HRT)	17
France (SNEP Sales Chart)	142
Ireland (IRMA)	96
Netherlands (Dutch Top 40)	40
New Zealand Hot Singles (RMNZ)	19
Poland Airplay (ZPAV)	33
Scotland Singles (OCC)	8
UK Singles (OCC)	57

== Release history ==
Country	Date	Format	Version	Label	Ref.
Various	13 March 2020	Digital download; streaming	Original single	Atlantic Records; Warner Music^{[a]}	
Various	10 April 2020	Digital download; streaming	Live from London	Atlantic Records; Warner Music^{[a]}	
Various	17 April 2020	Digital download; streaming	MÖWE Remix	Atlantic Records; Warner Music^{[a]}	
Various	24 April 2020	Digital download; streaming	aboutagirl Remix	Atlantic Records; Warner Music^{[a]}	
Various	24 April 2020	Digital download; streaming	LARI LUKE Remix	Atlantic Records; Warner Music^{[a]}	
Various	24 April 2020	Digital download; streaming	Sam Feldt Remix	Atlantic Records; Warner Music^{[a]}	
Various	1 May 2020	Digital download; streaming	Bomba Estéreo Remix Remix	Atlantic Records; Warner Music^{[a]}	

- ^{^[a]} Ora is signed to Atlantic Records UK who distribute her music in the UK, Warner Records handle releases elsewhere in the world except several Asian countries licensed by Sony Music Entertainment Asia.
