= Big (Rita Ora, David Guetta and Imanbek song) =

2021 single by Rita Ora, David Guetta and Imanbek featuring Gunna

Single by Rita Ora, David Guetta and Imanbek featuring Gunna

from the EP Bang
- Released: 12 February 2021
- Genre: Dance pop; EDM; Hip house; Hip house; pop-rap; Electro house
- Length: 2:36
- Label: Atlantic; Warner
- Songwriters: Rita Ora; David Guetta; Imanbek; Gunna; Alexander Eskeerdo Izquierdo; Ed Sheeran; Marcus Lomax; Mike Hawkins; Sam Martin; Toby Green; William Spencer Bastian
- Producers: David Guetta; Imanbek; Mike Hawkins; Sam Martin; Toby Green; William Spencer Bastian

Rita Ora singles chronology
"How to Be Lonely" (2020)	"Big" (2021)	"You for Me" (2021)

David Guetta singles chronology
"Dreams" (2020)	"Big" (2021)	"Floating Through Space" (2021)

Imanbek singles chronology
"Goodbye" (2020)	"Big" (2021)	"Leck" (2021)

Gunna singles chronology
"Stackin It" (2021)	"Big" (2021)	"Murder Me" (2021)

Music video
- "Big" on YouTube

"Big" is a song by British singer Rita Ora, French disc jockey David Guetta, and Kazakh disc jockey Imanbek featuring American rapper Gunna from Ora and Imanbek's collaborative extended play Bang (2021). The song was penned by the artists, Eskeerdo, Ed Sheeran, Marcus Lomax, Mike Hawkins, Sam Martin, Toby Green, and William Spencer Bastian, the latter four producing it alongside the DJs. Atlantic and Warner released it as the lead single from the EP for digital download and streaming in various countries on 12 February 2021. Featuring dance, EDM, electro-pop, hip house, and pop rap music, the song's lyrics celebrate the moment of having a good time and the memories of crazy nights.

Following its release, "Big" garnered critical acclaim from music critics for the collaboration between the artists, the music and sound, as well as the vocal delivery of Ora and Gunna. The song peaked at number seven in Bulgaria and charted in Croatia, Germany, Hungary, Ireland, Lithuania, Switzerland, and the United Kingdom. It also achieved number 11 on the US Billboard Dance/Electronic Songs ranking. Filmed in Bulgaria, the music video for the song premiered on YouTube. It serves as a tribute to Ora's Albanian and Imanbek's Kazakh heritages, with Ora's performance featuring her in traditional Albanian attire.

== Background and composition ==
"Big" was penned by Ora, Guetta, Imanbek, Gunna (Sergio Kitchens), Alexander Eskeerdo Izquierdo, Ed Sheeran, Marcus Lomax, Mike Hawkins, Sam Martin, Toby Green and William Spencer Bastian, with the production completed by Guetta, Imanbek, Bastian, Green, Hawkins and Martin. Discussing the process of the song's creation, Ora mentioned that "When we received David Guetta's proposal, we loved it. The chorus was different, we felt we had to add something more to it. I called my friend Ed Sheeran for help [...] and then he wrote a new hook in less than 15 minutes".

Atlantic and Warner released "Big" for digital download and streaming in various countries on 12 February 2021 as the lead single from Ora and Imanbek's collaborative extended play Bang (2021). The song blends elements of dance, EDM, electro-pop, and hip house music, with its lyrics rekindling the "memories of wild nights among girlfriends" and cheering the moment of "having a good time to anthemic music". She highlights her excitement for a good time, singing lines such as, "You gon' know about it when we come through/ Bad bitches coming in twos/ Ain't nobody tellin' what we gon' do/ The way we run through, yeah, yeah". Accompanied by ad-libs from Gunna, Ora opens the first verse over a dark and thumping instrumental by Guetta and Imanbek. Following the chorus, Gunna can be heard in the background, while Ora leads the second verse that follows. Gunna then delivers a rap performance with his mumble-rap signature in the third verse.

== Reception ==
Following its release, "Big" garnered critical acclaim from music critics. Katie Bain from Billboard characterised the song as a "dancefloor of our minds". She highlighted the collaborative effort between the artists, commenting that "we kinda wish it were longer that two minutes and 37 seconds". A writer for the Official Charts Company, Jack White, labeled it a "lavish party anthem and a sure-fire floorfiller" and complimented the collaboration as well as the vocal performances of Ora and Gunna. Jannik Pesenacker of Dance-Charts correspondingly praised the collaboration for delivering a "strong radio song", with particular commendation for the harmony between the instrumental and vocals of Ora and Gunna. Sonia from NRJ noted it as a "well-paced [...] hit", while the staff of Kiss FM viewed the song as a "musical statement [...] that certainly deserves its name". Writing for Fun Radio, Nassim Aziki named it a "good vintage" and responded that "the pop side of [Ora] combined with the electro of [Guetta] works perfectly well". While reviewing Bang, Farrell Sweeney from Dancing Astronaut hailed the song for boasting a "heavy-hitting lineup" and regarded it as the "contender for project's radio favorite". Cameron Sunkel for EDM.com asserted that the collection does not disappoint, adding that "the [song] seeks to make a decisive statement with flashy lyrics and an even sleeker club bassline". In a mixed review, Sara Elisabeth Nedergaard from Gaffa opined that the song "is not bad" but pointed out that Guetta's signature sound "never changes" and "may become a little tired".

Peaking at number seven in Bulgaria, "Big" reached number 15 in Hungary, number 21 in Croatia, number 53 in both Ireland and the United Kingdom, number 68 in Switzerland, number 82 in Lithuania and number 95 in Germany. The song also peaked at number 11 on the US Billboard Dance/Electronic Songs ranking and number 154 on the Global Excl. US chart. It further garnered airplay in the Commonwealth of Independent States (CIS) and Russia, also entering the top 50 in the airplay rankings of Finland and Mexico.

== Music video ==
Screenshot from the music video of "Big". It showcases Rita Ora in traditional Albanian attire designed by Kosovo-Albanian designer Valdrin Sahiti.

To accompany the release, a music video for "Big" premiered on Guetta's official YouTube channel on 12 February 2021, which is a tribute to Ora's Albanian and Imanbek's Kazakh heritages. The video was filmed at the mount of Buzludzha and the cities of Pernik and Sofia in Bulgaria. Part of the production team included Alexandra Dragova, Becky Hicks, Evelyn Malezanova and Kosta Karakashyan. The traditional Albanian attire donned by her was created by Kosovo-Albanian designer Valdrin Sahiti, which was aimed to display the Albanian ethnographic style, as intended by Ora. Intended to create a visually distinctive "fantasy wonderland movie", the singer described the video as the most demanding and inspiring of her career. She stated that "It was so amazing to be able to mix all these cultures together and come up with a body of work that’s a world of its own".

The music video begins with an aerial shot capturing a vehicle transporting a group of individuals, leading to a solo performance by Ora on a pipeline located within a block of residential buildings. Next, it shifts to Ora inside the vehicle, with the camera focusing to her red boots adorned with the Albanian flag. A sequence of individuals dressed in white attire riding black horses through a misty field follows. Then, Ora is depicted while dancing in front of a mirror amidst a colorful pink and purple setting. Gunna appears performing from the back seat of a smoky grey car. Further interspersed shots portray Ora accompanied by a troupe of dancers performing to the song on the pipeline. The two-minute and 55 second long video ends with her fleeing on horseback to reach a frozen fortress.

Selene Morale from Los 40 highlighted the colorful and voluminous costumes in the video, which according to her, create a contrast against the backdrop of a gray and industrial setting. She further explained that "it is undoubtedly an analogy of what Ora's family must have experienced when they moved to England: the nature of your place of origin, in contrast to a world of cement, after arriving in the suburbs of a big city". Sonia of NRJ commented that the video "perfectly matches the climate of the moment". The staff of Kiss FM opined that it represents the collision of "fantasy and reality".

== Charts ==
=== Weekly charts ===
Weekly chart performance for "Big"
Chart (2021)	Peak position
Bulgaria Airplay (PROPHON)	7
Croatia International Airplay (Top lista)	21
Finland Airplay (Radiosoittolista)	45
Germany (GfK)	95
Global Excl. US (Billboard)	154
Hungary (Dance Top 40)	21
Hungary (Rádiós Top 40)	15
Ireland (IRMA)	53
Lithuania (AGATA)	82
Mexico Ingles Airplay (Billboard)	22
New Zealand Hot Singles (RMNZ)	16
Switzerland (Schweizer Hitparade)	68
UK Singles (Official Charts)	53
US Hot Dance/Electronic Songs (Billboard)	11

=== Year-end charts ===
Year-end chart performance for "Big"
Chart (2021)	Position
Hungary (Dance Top 100)	100
Hungary (Rádiós Top 100)	99
US Hot Dance/Electronic Songs (Billboard)	62

== Release history ==
Release dates and formats for "Big"
Region	Date	Format(s)	Label(s)	Ref.
Various	12 February 2021	Digital download; streaming	Atlantic; Warner	
