= Bang Bang (Rita Ora and Imanbek song) =

- "Amazon Original" artwork

Promotional single by Rita Ora and Imanbek

from the EP Bang
- Released: 12 February 2021
- Length: 2:59
- Label: Atlantic UK; Warner UK / What a DJ
- Songwriters: Rita Ora; Imanbek Zeikenov; Gia Koka; Harold Faltermeyer
- Producers: Imanbek Zeikenov; Gia Koka; Joe Hike; Matt Waro

Audio video
- "Bang Bang" on YouTube

"Bang Bang" is a song by British singer Rita Ora and Kazakh record producer Imanbek. It was released on 12 February 2021 as a promotional single from their collaborative EP, Bang (2021). The song samples the 1984 composition "Axel F" by Harold Faltermeyer.

== Performances ==
On 14 February 2021, Ora performed "Bang Bang" on series thirteen of ITV's Dancing on Ice. She later performed the song live at the Sydney Opera House for The Tonight Show Starring Jimmy Fallon on 3 March 2021 and a day later on Australian breakfast show Sunrise. In its third week on 11 March 2021, following a high-energy set at Sydney Gay and Lesbian Mardi Gras, "Bang Bang" was the biggest mover on Australian radio.

On 18 March 2021, Ora performed at the Nova Red Room, including a slower version of "Bang Bang", which was described by the station as "a hauntingly beautiful version". On 29 August 2021, a prerecorded performance by Ora of "Bang Bang" aired on The Voice (Australian season 10).

== Charts ==
=== Weekly charts ===
Weekly chart performance for "Bang Bang"
Chart (2021–2024)	Peak position
Belarus Airplay (TopHit)	191
CIS Airplay (TopHit)	9
Estonia Airplay (TopHit)	92
New Zealand Hot Singles (RMNZ)	6
Poland Airplay (ZPAV)	16
Russia Airplay (TopHit)	7
Ukraine Airplay (TopHit)	95
UK Singles Downloads (Official Charts)	27
US Dance/Electronic Digital Song Sales (Billboard)	20

=== Monthly charts ===
Monthly chart performance for "Bang Bang"
Chart (2021)	Peak position
CIS Airplay (TopHit)	13
Russia Airplay (TopHit)	11

=== Year-end charts ===
2021 year-end chart performance for "Bang Bang"
Chart (2021)	Position
CIS Airplay (TopHit)	89
Russia Airplay (TopHit)	84

2024 year-end chart performance for "Bang Bang"
Chart (2024)	Position
Estonia Airplay (TopHit)	142
