= Cornelia James =

Cornelia James may refer to:

- Cornelia James (glovemaker) (1917–1999), British glovemaker and businesswoman of Austrian origin, founder of the company below
- Cornelia James (company), British firm of glovemakers, founded in 1946
- Cornelia James Cannon (1876–1969), feminist reformer and best-selling author of the novel Red Rust
