= Snailspace =

Brighton art trail of fibreglass snails

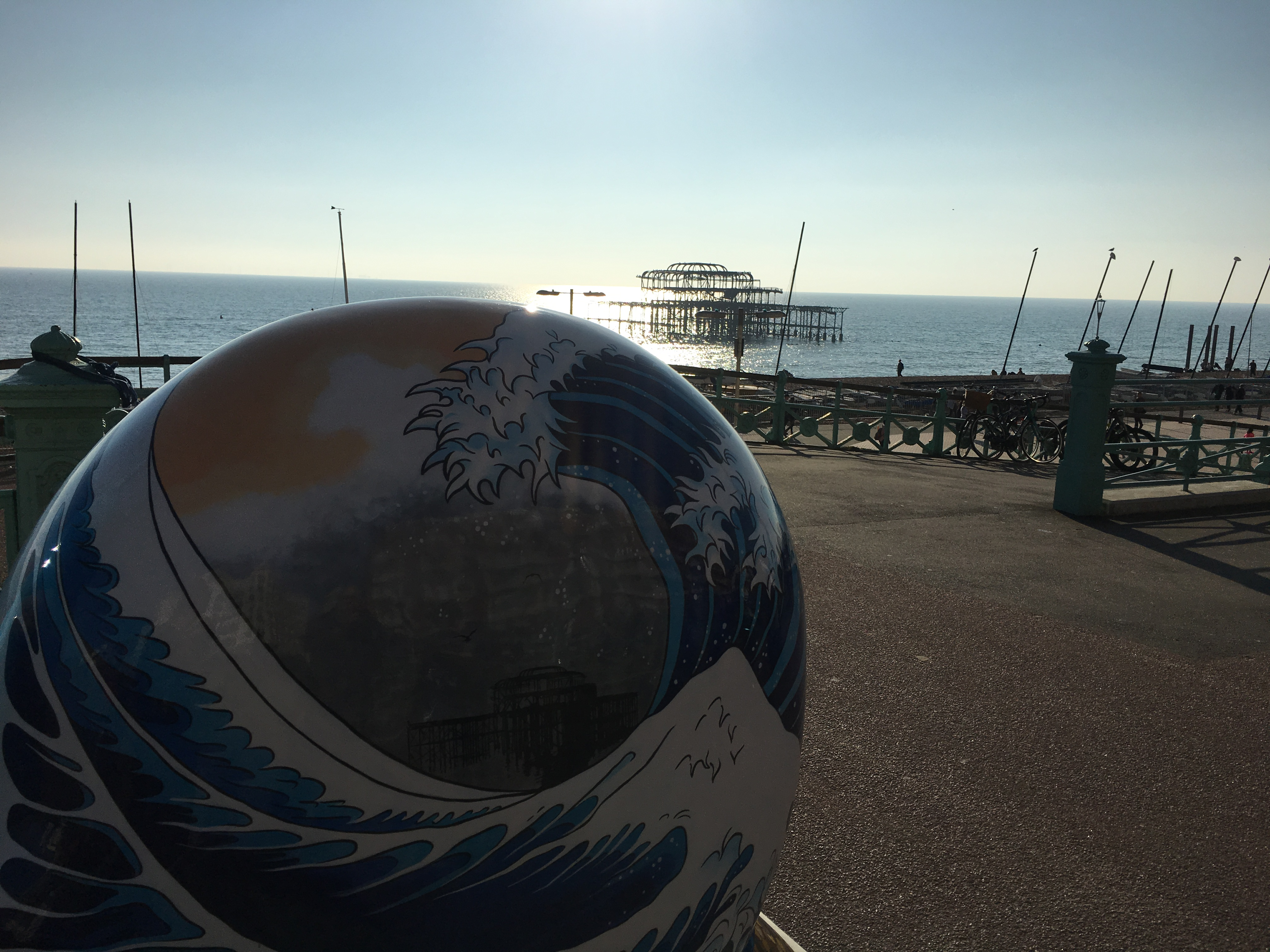
The Hokusai Snail, designed by Fiona Blair.

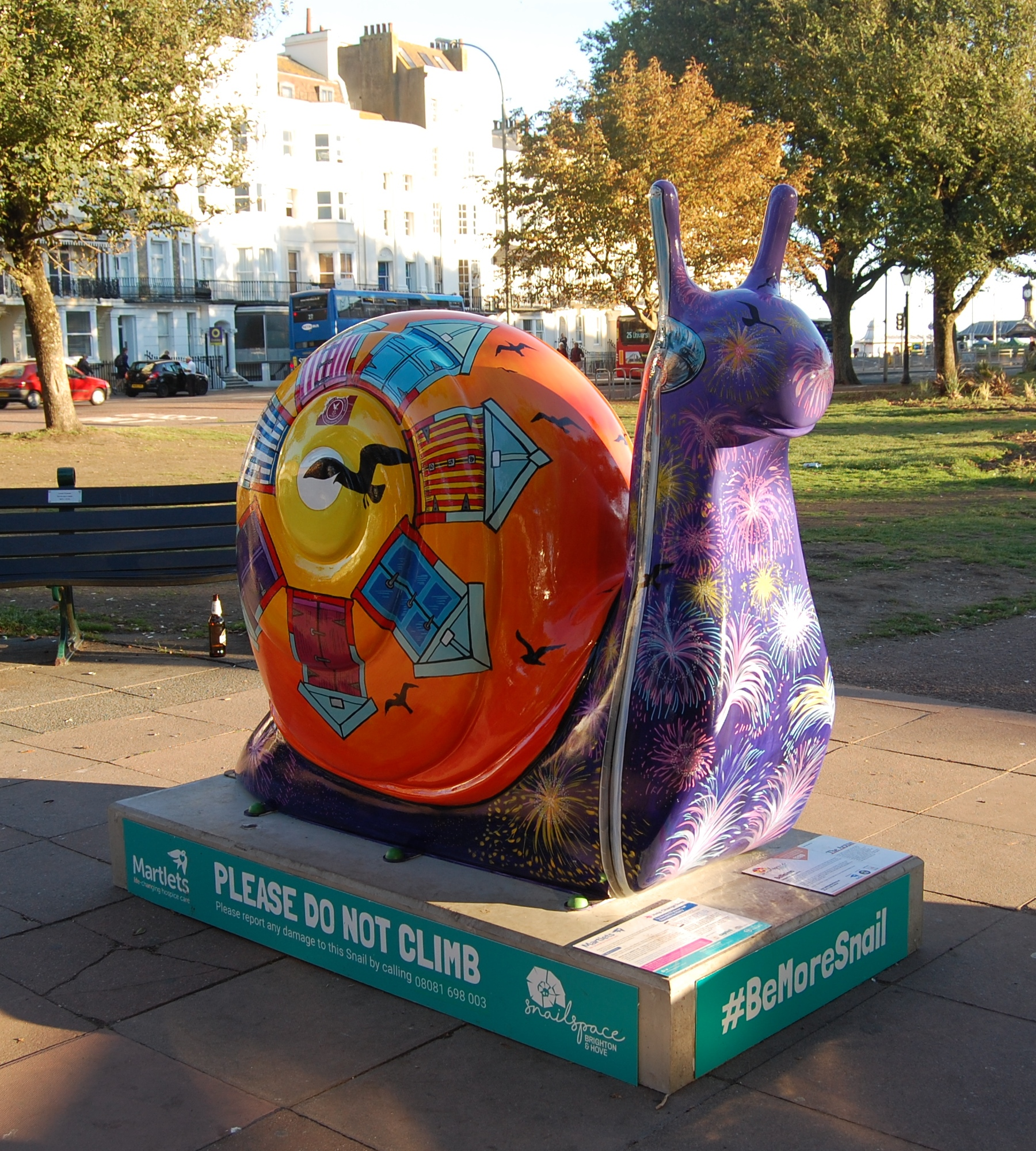
The Bellissimo snail at Old Steine, Brighton.

Snailspace was an art installation and trail organised by hospice charity Martlets in cooperation with Wild in Art from 15 September to 18 November 2018. It consisted of 50 Fibreglass snails temporarily erected around Brighton. It was a follow-up to their 2016 Art Trail, "Snowdogs by the Sea" which was a similar concept featuring dogs.

== Background ==
The subject matter was proposed and naming policy devised by IDEAS, a UK-based design consultancy - the concept was one of three ideas put to Wild In Art Director: Charlie Langhorne during a Falkirk Council meeting for their community art project in 2016. Reflecting on his original concept drawings at aptly branded ‘Snailspace’ trail, IDEAS Creative director, Don Jack said “this is the perfect antidote to the fast-paced stresses of life in the digital age“ Complementing the concept, Wild In Art Director: Charlie Langhorne went on "The snails are 'out there' and innovative and will be worthy of huge exposure."

SnailSpace followed the success of Martlets' previous art exhibition "Snowdogs by the Sea", which lasted between September and November 2016 and raised over £310,000 for the charity. It featured 40 Fibreglass dogs, based on the snowdog from Raymond Briggs' book The Snowman and the Snowdog. It followed the format of a farewell ceremony following the exhibit, then an auction to raise money for the hospice. In 2017, Martlets put out an ad for local artists to work on this "unusual 3D canvas" and to contact project manager Sarah Harvey to get involved.

While the artists were being rounded up, Martlets ran a "Junior Snailway" where British illustrator Nick Sharratt ran workshops to design 57 small snails. Also throughout this period, Martlets hired a number of sponsors around Brighton, and also enlisted the help of various shops, who would give out their products discounted or free, as a reward for participants of the Snail Trail.

== The works ==
Martlets started the installation by promoting their #BeMoreSnail hashtag. They used it to promote being mellow, and "snailing" your way through life. Their "Daily Snail" newsletter on their website further hyped the trail. Martlets then promoted their SnailSpace app, which tracked your progress and your rewards for following the trail. Each snail had a plaque with a four-letter numerical code on it, that you entered into the app to prove your visitation of the snail, and redeem your prize. Each snail was sponsored by a local company. Imelda Glackin, CEO of Martlets, said:

"The Snail sculpture resonates wonderfully with the work we do. Our life-changing hospice care helps people do the things they love with the time they have left. In this fast-paced city, it’s often hard to remember to slow down and appreciate the things in life that make us smile."

The trail opened on 15 September 2018. On 14 November, four days before the installation closed, Martlets held a farewell party where they brought together all of the snails at the St Augustines Arts and Events Centre.

The exhibit closed on 18 November. The auction that followed was held by Mark Stacey on 4 December. Altogether the snails fetched £230,000.
