= Roy Grace series =

Series of detective novels by Peter James

Roy Grace
- Author: Peter James
- Country: United Kingdom
- Language: English
- Genre: Crime fiction, Thriller fiction
- Published: 2005–present
- Media type: Print
- No. of books: 23

The Roy Grace series consists of twenty three crime thriller novels written by British author Peter James. The main character is a Detective Superintendent with the Sussex Police in Brighton, England.

== Roy Grace character ==
Roy Grace is portrayed as a dedicated and successful police officer with a troubled personal life. His wife, Sandy, disappeared under mysterious circumstances, leaving him haunted and driven by the need to discover her fate. This backstory provides ongoing subplots across the series. Grace later remarries and starts a new family, reflecting changes in his personal outlook and circumstances.

Grace is known for his willingness to embrace unconventional methods, including using psychics and mediums, which sometimes puts him at odds with his colleagues. His methods, combined with solid police work, lead to him solving complex cases. Grace's character development throughout the series is shown by both professional achievements and personal challenges, making him a flawed but compelling character.

== Books in the Roy Grace series ==
1. Dead Simple (2005)
2. Looking Good Dead (2006)
3. Not Dead Enough (2007)
4. Dead Man's Footsteps (2008)
5. Dead Tomorrow (2009)
6. Dead Like You (2010)
7. Dead Man's Grip (2011)
8. Not Dead Yet (2012)
9. Dead Man's Time (2013)
10. Want You Dead (2014)
11. You Are Dead (2016)
12. Love You Dead (2017)
13. Need You Dead (2017)
14. Dead If You Don't (2018)
15. Dead At First Sight (2019)
16. Find Them Dead (2020)
17. Left You Dead (2021)
18. Picture You Dead (2022)
19. Wish You Were Dead - Quick Reads (2023)
20. Stop Them Dead (2023)
21. They Thought I Was Dead: Sandy's Story (2024) - Novella
22. One Of Us Is Dead (2024)
23. The Hawk Is Dead (September 2025)

== Reception ==
The Roy Grace novels have been critically acclaimed for their realism and depth of the characters. The author draws heavily from real police procedures using first-hand accounts, which lend authenticity and depth. The books have enjoyed widespread popularity, ranking on bestseller lists and building a strong fanbase.

The series has won 21 Sunday Times Best-Sellers and sold 23 million copies worldwide.

== Adaptations ==
=== Theatre ===
Several of the Grace novels have been adapted for the stage by Shaun McKenna: The Perfect Murder (2014 and 2016), Dead Simple (2015), Not Dead Enough (2017), Looking Good Dead (2021), Wish You Were Dead (2023) and Picture You Dead (2025). Across the productions, Grace has been played by Steven Miller, Thomas Howes, Gray O'Brien, Benjamin Wilkin, Shane Richie, Bill Ward, Harry Long, and George Rainsford.

=== Television ===
The books have been adapted into a television series titled Grace. Starring John Simm as the superintendent, the series first aired in 2021 on ITV. It captures the essence of the books, focusing on Grace's investigative methods and personal life. The series has been well-received for its adaptation of the source material and strong performances, particularly by Simm.
