= Alchemist (novel) =

Alchemist is a novel by Peter James published by Victor Gollancz in 1996.

== Plot summary ==
Alchemist is a novel about the daughter of a world-leading professor in genetics, and involves a pharmaceutical company being run for sinister purposes.

== Reception ==
Andy Butcher reviewed Alchemist for Arcane magazine, rating it a 6 out of 10 overall. Butcher comments that "anyone looking for a simple read will probably end up having mixed feelings about Alchemist."
