= Peter James (writer) =

English novelist (born 1948)

Peter James OBE
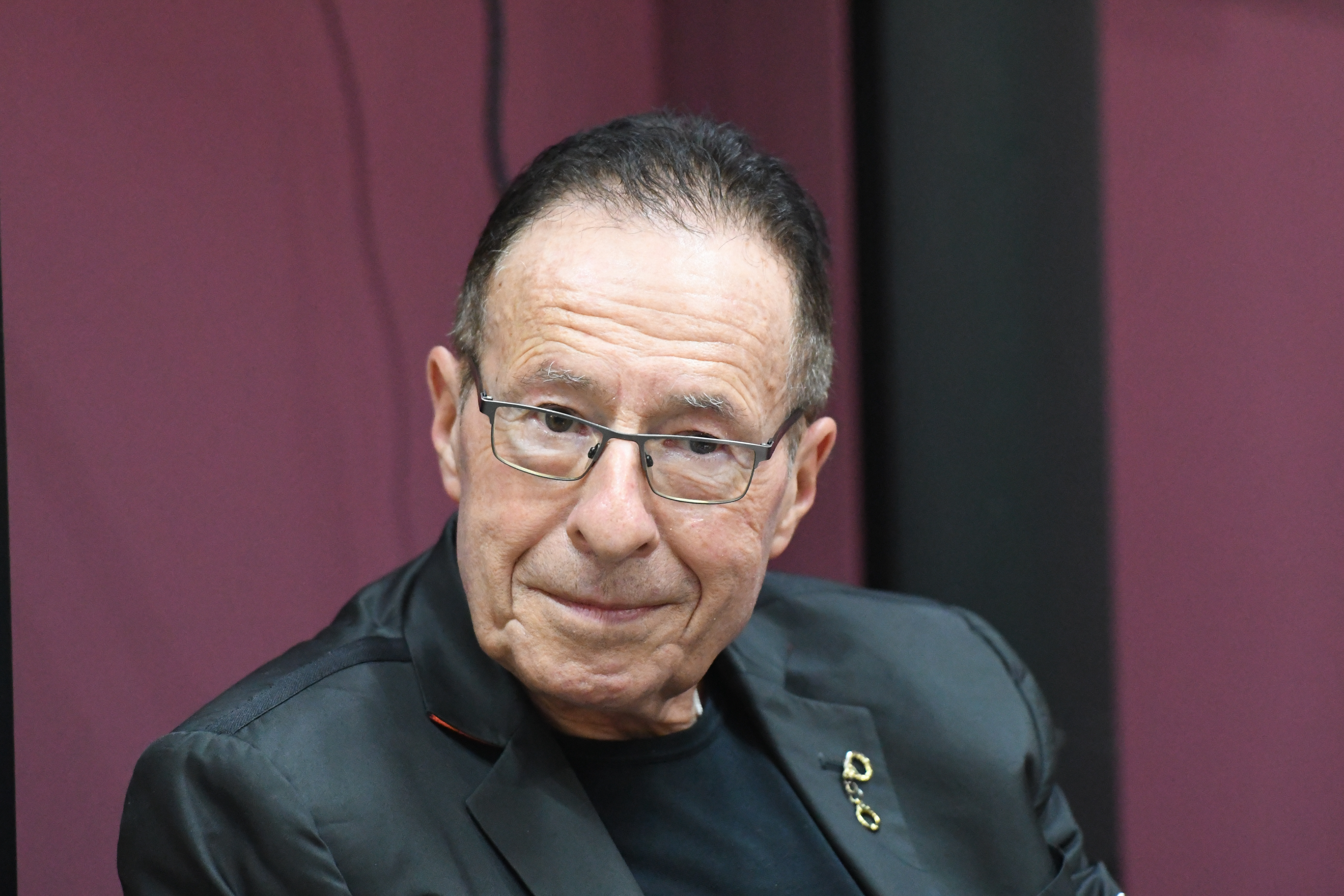
- James in 2025
- Born: 22 August 1948 (age 78); Brighton, East Sussex, England
- Spouses: Georgina Wilkin (m. 1979–1998) Lara James (m. 2015)
- Parent(s): Cornelia Katz (mother); Jack James (father)
- Writing career
- Genre: Crime
- Notable work: Roy Grace series
- Notable awards: 2012 Sussex Police, Outstanding Public Service Award; 2015 WHSmith, The Best Crime Author of all Time Winner; 2016 CWA Diamond Dagger recipient, the prestigious award by the Crime Writers Association
- Website: www.peterjames.com

Peter John James OBE (born 22 August 1948) is a British writer of crime. He was born in Brighton, the son of Cornelia James, the former glovemaker to Queen Elizabeth II.

== Education and early career ==
James was educated at Charterhouse and went on to Ravensbourne Film School. For a brief period of time whilst at film school, James worked as Orson Welles's house cleaner. Subsequently, he spent several years in North America, working as a screenwriter and film producer, beginning in Canada in 1970 working first as a gofer, then writer, on the children's television series Polka Dot Door.

== Personal life ==
His interests include criminology, religion, science and the paranormal, as well as food and wine. He has written many restaurant columns. He is also a self-confessed "petrol head," having owned many fast cars over the years, including four Aston Martins, AMG and Brabus Mercedes, a Bentley Continental GT Speed and two classic Jaguar E-Types. He holds an international racing licence, and has in the past competed in the Britcar series in both a Honda Accord and a former British Touring Car Championship SEAT Toledo. His 1965 BMW 1800 Ti, with his co-driver Steve Soper, came 10th overall in the St Mary's Trophy in the Goodwood Revival in 2013. James currently races a 1962 C1 Corvette and a 1964 Mini Cooper S. He has donated two police cars to Sussex Police, which bear his name, and a police car to States of Jersey Police.

He is married to Lara James (m. 2015). His first, 19-year marriage was to Georgina Wilkin, from 1979 until 1998.

In January 1999, James was diagnosed with type 2 diabetes.

== Work ==
=== Literature ===
James has written 36 novels, including the a crime thriller series featuring Brighton-based Detective Superintendent Roy Grace, which have sold 21 million copies worldwide and have given him 21 consecutive UK Sunday Times number ones, as well as number ones in Germany, France, Russia and Canada, and he is also a New York Times best-seller. James's books have been translated into 38 languages. In the UK and the US, they are published by Macmillan Publishers. In 1993 Penguin Books published his novel Host on two floppy discs (in addition to conventional print formats). It has been called the world's first electronic novel and a copy of it is in the Science Museum. James has written supernatural thrillers, spy fiction, science-based thrillers, a children's novel, and the novella The Perfect Murder, which was 15 weeks at number one on iBooks and 45 weeks in their top 10, was adapted by Shaun McKenna into a stage play which had a smash hit tour in 2014 and returned to stage in 2016. Subsequent stage adaptations of his novels, all also by Shaun McKenna, include Dead Simple, Not Dead Enough and The House on Cold Hill have also had sell-out national tours. Looking Good Dead & Wish You Were dead have grossed over £17m at the UK box office and have been successful in many countries abroad. His seventh stage play, Picture You Dead starts on national tour in February 2025.

James was two-times chairman of the Crime Writers' Association, and was the programming chairman for the Theakston's Old Peculier Crime Writing Festival in 2016, a part of the Harrogate International Festivals portfolio.

He hosts The Author's Studio, a free online learning facility for all budding authors, on his YouTube channel.

In 2017, James wrote the foreword for the UK edition of The Crime Book, with American crime author Cathy Scott writing the foreword for the US edition. The nonfiction book, a volume in the Big Ideas Simply Explained series, was released by Dorling Kindersley (Penguin Random House) in April 2017 in the UK and May 2017 in the US.

Her Majesty Queen Camilla said of his Roy Grace novels: "I've started at the very beginning, so the nice thing about his books is that, although there is a pretty terrifying story that goes on, you've always got the thread of Grace and what's happening in his life, and there are lots of twists and turns, and it just keeps you on your toes."

=== Film ===
James has been involved in 26 films in writer and/or producing roles. His 1993 novel Host was adapted into the 1998 television movie Virtual Obsession. Other films on which he is credited include: Children Shouldn't Play with Dead Things, The Neptune Factor, Blue Blood, Malachi's Cove, The Blockhouse starring Peter Sellers, Spanish Fly starring Terry-Thomas and Leslie Phillips, A Different Loyalty starring Sharon Stone, The Bridge of San Luis Rey starring Robert De Niro, and The Statement starring Michael Caine.

In 2005 The Merchant of Venice, directed by Michael Radford and for which James was executive producer, had a royal premiere in the presence of Prince Charles and received a BAFTA Award nomination. In 2006 the film also won the Silver Ribbon for Best Production Design (Migliore Scenografia) from the Italian National Syndicate of Film Journalists.

=== Television ===
His 1992 novel Prophecy was adapted into the first episode of the 1995 Chiller TV series. Since 2021, his Roy Grace series has been adapted into the ITV series Grace, starring John Simm. Season 5 aired in 2025.

=== Other work ===
James is patron of the Sussex Police Charitable Trust, patron of Brighton & Hove Samaritans, patron of the Brighton Greyhound Owners Association Retired Greyhound Trust, patron of Brighton and Hove Independent Mediation Service, patron of Relate in Sussex, patron of Terrys Cross House, patron of Little Green Pig, national co-patron of Neighbourhood Watch, co-patron of Sussex Crimestoppers, honorary patron for the South Mid Sussex Community First Responders, vice-president of The Old Police Cells Museum in Brighton. He is an ambassador for the University of Brighton, and a Martlets Hospice Champion (which he also supports through his annual Peter James Golf Classic). He supports Action Medical Research. He also supports and works with The Reading Agency, a charity with a mission to give everyone an equal chance in life by helping people become confident and enthusiastic readers.

== Awards ==
- 1967 Charterhouse school poetry prize
- 1969 Esquire Magazine International College Film Festival, The Island
- 1974 Sitges International Horror Film Festival, Best Foreign Film for Dead of Night
- 1999 Honorary Fellowship, FHS Emeritus award by the Hypnotherapy Society
- 2000 Public Awareness of Science Award, runner up, Alchemist
- 2004 BAFTA nomination for The Merchant of Venice
- 2004 Rose D'Or nomination at the Montreux Television Festival, Bedsitcom
- 2005 Krimi-Blitz, Best Crime Writer of the Year in Germany
- 2006 Le Prix Polar International, Comme Une Tombe (French translation of Dead Simple)
- 2007 Le Prix Cœur Noir at the Saint-Quentin-en-Yvelines festival, Comme Une Tombe (French translation of Dead Simple)
- 2007 Richard & Judy Galaxy British Book Awards – Crime Thriller of the Year, shortlisted, Looking Good Dead
- 2007 Prix SNCF du Polar, shortlisted, La Mort Leur Va Si Bien (French translation of Looking Good Dead)
- 2007 Le Grand Prix de littérature policère, shortlisted, La Mort Leur Va Si Bien (French translation of Looking Good Dead)
- 2008 Theakston's Old Peculier Crime Novel of the Year Award, shortlisted, Not Dead Enough
- 2008 ITV Crime Thriller Author of the Year, shortlisted, Not Dead Enough
- 2009 Theakston's Old Peculier Crime Novel of the Year Award, shortlisted, Dead Man's Footsteps
- 2009 CWA Dagger in the Library, shortlisted
- 2009 Honorary Doctorate of Letters at the University of Brighton
- 2010 Sounds of Crime Award, best abridged and unabridged novel, Dead Tomorrow
- 2010 Galaxy British Book Awards – Sainsbury Popular Fiction Book of the Year shortlisted, Dead Like You
- 2010 Quick Reads Readers' Favourite Award, The Perfect Murder
- 2011 Sounds of Crime Award, best abridged and unabridged novel, Dead Like You
- 2011 ITV3 Crime Thriller Awards Winner, People's Bestseller Dagger for Crime Novel of the Year
- 2011 Barry Award, winner, Dead Man's Grip
- 2012 Wellcome Trust Book Prize, shortlisted, Perfect People
- 2012 Sussex Police, Outstanding Public Service Award
- 2012 Specsavers National Book Awards, Crime Thriller of the Year, shortlisted, Perfect People
- 2013 Argus Outstanding Contribution to Sussex Award
- 2013 Specsavers National Book Awards, Crime Thriller of the Year 2013 – shortlisted – Dead Man's Time
- 2014 Sainsbury's eBook of the Year Award – Winner – Want You Dead
- 2015 WHSmith. The Best Crime Author of all Time – Winner
- 2015 Honorary Mastership of the Open University
- 2015 Dagger in the Library UK Crime Writers' Association award for an author's body of work in British libraries (UK) shortlisted
- 2015 Dead Good Readers Dr Lecter Award for Scariest Villain – Winner – You Are Dead
- 2016 CWA Diamond Dagger Award Recipient
- 2016 Dead Good Readers Tess Gerritsen Award for Best Series – Winner – Roy Grace
- 2017 CAMEO Award – Book To Stage Category – shortlist – Not Dead Enough
- 2017 Poland – Lubimyczytac.pl Book Of The Year award, Horror Category – Winner – The House On Cold Hill
- 2017 Germany – Rheinbach Glass Dagger Award for Crime Fiction – Winner
- 2017 Sussex Life Hero at the Celebration of Sussex Life – Winner
- 2018 Specsavers Honorary Platinum Award for book sales over 5 million
- 2018 Specsavers National Book Awards – Audiobook Of The Year – Shortlist – Absolute Proof
- 2021 Specsavers Crimefest - Audible Sounds of Crime Award nominee - Find them Dead
- 2021 Brighton & Hove Business Awards - Outstanding Brightonian of the Year Award

== Bibliography ==
=== Roy Grace novels ===
- Dead Simple (2005)
- Looking Good Dead (2006)
- Not Dead Enough (2007)
- Dead Man's Footsteps (2008)
- Dead Tomorrow (2009)
- Dead Like You (2010)
- Dead Man's Grip (2011)
- Not Dead Yet (2012)
- Dead Man's Time (2013)
- Want You Dead (2014)
- You Are Dead (2015)
- Love You Dead (2016)
- Need You Dead (2017)
- Dead If You Don't (2018)
- Dead At First Sight (2019)
- Find Them Dead (2020)
- Left You Dead (2021)
- Wish You Were Dead (2021) (short story)
- Picture You Dead (2022)
- Stop Them Dead (2023)
- One of Us Is Dead (2024)
- The Hawk Is Dead (2025)
- Dead in Three Two One (2026)

=== Roy Grace spin off novels ===
- They Thought I Was Dead: Sandy's Story (2024)

=== Other novels ===
- Dead Letter Drop (1981)
- Atom Bomb Angel (1982)
- Billionaire (1983)
- Travelling Man (1984)
- Biggles: The Untold Story (1986)
- Possession (1988)
- Dreamer (1989)
- Sweet Heart (1991)
- Twilight (1991)
- Prophecy (1992)
- Host (1993)
- Alchemist (1996)
- Getting Wired (1996)
- The Truth (1997)
- Denial (1998)
- Faith (2000)
- The Perfect Murder (2010) (novella)
- Perfect People (2011)
- A Twist of the Knife (2014) (short story collection)
- The House on Cold Hill (2015)
- Absolute Proof (2018)
- The Secret of Cold Hill (2019)
- I Follow You (2020)

=== Non-fiction ===
- Death Comes Knocking – Policing Roy Grace's Brighton (2016)
- Babes in the Wood (2020)
