= Grace (TV series) =

British crime drama television series

- Genre: Crime drama
- Based on: Roy Grace novels by Peter James
- Written by: Russell Lewis
- Directed by: John Alexander; Julia Ford
- Starring: John Simm; Richie Campbell; Rakie Ayola; Laura Elphinstone; Amaka Okafor; Brad Morrison; Craig Parkinson; Adrian Rawlins
- Music by: Matthew Slater
- Country of origin: United Kingdom
- Original language: English
- No. of series: 6
- No. of episodes: 20

Production
- Executive producers: Andrew O'Connor; Paul Sandler; Patrick Schweitzer; Russell Lewis; Peter James; John Simm; Phil Hunter; Kiaran Murray-Smith
- Producer: Kiaran Murray-Smith
- Running time: 90 minutes
- Production companies: Second Act Productions; Tall Story Pictures; Vaudeville Productions

Original release
- Network: ITV
- Release: 14 March 2021 – present

Grace is a British television crime drama series based in Brighton and Hove, England, starring John Simm in the title role of Detective Superintendent Roy Grace, a dogged detective who, haunted by the disappearance of his wife some years previously, solves a variety of cases.

Based on the bestselling novels by Peter James, the series was adapted by screenwriter Russell Lewis with a pair of films comprising the novels Dead Simple and Looking Good Dead, filmed in 2020 for broadcast in 2021. Dead Simple, broadcast in March 2021, attracted an estimated 7.2m viewers, which made it the fifth-most-watched programme for the week of 8–14 March, according to BARB.

Following strong viewing figures for the opening episode, a second series of three films was commissioned in 2021, with broadcasting beginning in May 2022. A third series was commissioned in 2022, with filming beginning in August 2022 and broadcast starting in March 2023. Three further series were commissioned and broadcast on ITV. Series 6 premiered on ITV on 29 March 2026. A seventh series was confirmed by ITV on 22 April 2026 and filming began on 27 April 2026.

== Production ==
The first series was predominantly filmed in Brighton and Hove, with location filming also taking place elsewhere in Sussex, particularly around the border between East and West Sussex. The opening titles for each episode feature the shipping forecast read by Zeb Soanes. The first episode, Dead Simple, originally set to air on 21 March, was shifted forward in the schedules by a week to avoid a clash with the launch of the sixth series of the BBC's Line of Duty. This led to the postponement of the first episode of series 2, Looking Good Dead, until a later date. Consequently Looking Good Dead was available to stream in the United States more than a year before its British broadcast.

The second series, commissioned in May 2021, adapts the next three novels in the Grace series: Not Dead Enough, Dead Man's Footsteps and Dead Tomorrow. Filming began in September 2021 in the West Sussex town of Burgess Hill, and broadcast commenced in the UK on 24 April 2022.

A third series was commissioned in May 2022, adapted from the novels Dead Like You, Dead Man's Grip and Not Dead Yet. Russell Lewis stepped down as showrunner and principal writer, with former Whitechapel writers Ben Court and Caroline Ip penning two episodes, and screenwriter Ed Whitmore penning the other. Sam Hoare is featured as a new ACC, following the departure of Rakie Ayola at the end of series two.

== Cast ==
- John Simm as Detective Superintendent Roy Grace
- Richie Campbell as Detective Sergeant (later Detective Inspector) Glenn Branson
- Rakie Ayola as Assistant Chief Constable Alison Vosper (Series 1–3)
- James D'Arcy as Detective Superintendent Cassian Pewe (Series 2)
- Sam Hoare as Assistant Chief Constable Cassian Pewe (from Series 3)
- Craig Parkinson as DS Norman Potting (Series 1–4)
- Laura Elphinstone as DS Bella Moy
- Brad Morrison as DC Nick Nicholl
- Amaka Okafor as DC Emma-Jayne Boutwood (Series 1)
- Juliette Motamed as DC Vee Wilde (from Series 5)
- Zoë Tapper as Cleo Morey (from Series 2)
- Clare Calbraith as Sandy Grace (Series 2–4)
- Adrian Rawlins as Harry Frame (Series 1)
- Steven Hartley as Sean Klinger (Series 2)

== Episodes ==
Series	Episodes	Originally released	
Series	Episodes	First released	Last released
1	2	14 March 2021	4 May 2021
2	3	24 April 2022	22 May 2022
3	3	19 March 2023	2 April 2023
4	4	2 July 2024	23 July 2024
5	4	6 April 2025	27 April 2025
6	4	29 March 2026	19 April 2026

=== Series 1 (2021) ===
No.	Title	Directed by	Written by	Original release date	UK viewers (millions)
1	"Dead Simple"	John Alexander	Russell Lewis	14 March 2021	8.77(#5)
A group of friends on a stag night are involved in a road accident and are all killed except for the groom, a wealthy Brighton property developer who has vanished. Detective Superintendent Grace is called upon by colleague Detective Sergeant Branson to help. The search and investigation uncover lines of inquiry which involve his bride and his best friend and business partner.
2	"Looking Good Dead"	Julia Ford	Russell Lewis	4 May 2021 (United States); 24 April 2022 (United Kingdom)	6.13 (#8)
When parts of a young woman's body are discovered on the Downs, Grace believes the murder is connected to two prior killings involving sex-drug overdoses. Meanwhile, a local businessman stumbles upon a memory stick containing an access key to a dark-Web snuff site, where he witnesses the woman's murder, and the shadowy operators of the site warn him not to go to the police, or his family will suffer.

=== Series 2 (2022) ===
No.	Title	Directed by	Written by	Original release date	UK viewers (millions)
1	"Not Dead Enough"	Henrik Georgsson	Russell Lewis	1 May 2022	6.30 (#4)
When businesswoman Katya Bishop is brutally murdered, all the evidence points to her businessman husband, Kit (Arthur Darvill), especially when his girlfriend is also found dead in a similar manner. The only problem being, Kit has a solid alibi for both murders – so how could he possibly be in two places at once? Meanwhile, Grace becomes friendly with new forensic pathologist, Cleo Morey (Zoe Tapper), but their relationship gets off to a bumpy start when she becomes the latest target of a hitman following every moment of Grace and his team. Could Kit Bishop be connected? And if so, will Grace manage to stop him before he commits any further crimes?
2	"Dead Man's Footsteps"	Brian Kelly	Russell Lewis	8 May 2022	6.29 (#3)
The discovery of skeletal remains in a Brighton storm drain and a young girl being hunted by an armed hitman appear to be unconnected, until the two cases unexpectedly collide in the most unimaginable way. Meanwhile, a former colleague of Grace's from the Met, Cassian Pewe (James D'Arcy) has been sent down to assist the team, and immediately sets about re-opening the investigation into the disappearance of Grace's wife. As the two come to loggerheads, it soon becomes a battle of wills as old enemies must unite to save Abby Morton (Katie Clarkson-Hill) and her elderly mother from those desperate to recover a sheet of priceless stamps.
3	"Dead Tomorrow"	Kate Saxon	Russell Lewis	22 May 2022	5.77 (#6)
When an unidentified Jane Doe is dredged up from the seabed of the English channel, Grace and his team are led into the murky world of an organised crime group masterminded by fixer Julia Giroux (Joséphine de La Baume) and corrupt quack Roger Gunnislake (Stephen Boxer), who are harvesting the organs of illegal immigrants for private sale. The disappearance of a local fishing trawler used in the dredging proves to be a vital clue in cracking the case. Privately, things appear to be going well for Grace, until he receives a call from a former colleague who claims to have information that appears to suggest that Sandy may still be alive.

=== Series 3 (2023) ===
No.	Title	Directed by	Written by	Original release date	UK viewers (millions)
1	"Dead Like You"	Camilla Stroem Henriksen	Ben Court & Caroline Ip	19 March 2023	6.72 (#4)
A chilling event at the Royal Edward Hotel on the night of ACC Vosper's leaving party along with the return of Cassian Pewe forces Grace into a difficult position.
2	"Dead Man's Grip"	Isher Sahota	Ed Whitmore	26 March 2023	6.68 (#4)
At the site of a tragic road traffic collision an unexpected discovery suggests more to the case than meets the eye.
3	"Not Dead Yet"	William Sinclair	Ben Court & Caroline Ip	2 April 2023	6.00 (#4)
The team splits to investigate a shocking attack on the music scene and a gruesome discovery on a pig farm.

=== Series 4 (2024) ===
The series was broadcast from 2 July 2024 on BritBox in the United States. It was broadcast on ITV1 from 1 September 2024.

No.	Title	Directed by	Written by	Original release date	UK viewers (millions)
1	"Dead Man's Time"	Brian Kelly	Ed Whitmore	2 July 2024 (United States); 1 September 2024 (United Kingdom)	5.31
A brutal robbery at a secluded Brighton house pulls Grace and Branson into a challenging enquiry when thousands of pounds worth of beautiful antiques are stolen and the owner is left fighting for her life. The prime target, however, appears to have been an item of great sentimental value to the homeowner and her brother, a renowned antiques dealer. This particular item has deep emotional ties to a fascinating mystery involving their father which spans back to 1960s East London and a painful night on which their life as they knew it changed forever. The question is – who knew it was in the house? As Grace digs deeper into this mysterious crime, he unearths a web of ancient grudges. A web which leads him down a murderous trail through the world of Brighton antiques in a race against time to discover who is at the heart of this robbery, recover what was taken and bring to light answers which have been buried for many years.
2	"Want You Dead"	Bille Eltringham	Ben Court & Caroline Ip	9 July 2024 (United States); 8 September 2024 (United Kingdom)	5.28
Grace’s team investigates a case where nothing is ever as it first appears. When an unidentified murder victim is found left out in the open Sussex countryside in curious circumstances, the post-mortem reveals more questions than it does answers. As Grace works to identify the body, hoping this might provide some crucial clue as to the killer’s motive, a chilling discovery in central Brighton suggests something more is at play here. Both crime scenes are puzzling and elaborate – designed to send a deliberate message. It seems that whoever is doing this wants the police to know these deaths are connected, but why? As Grace untangles a challenging trail of clues to discover what links each victim to the killer, it becomes apparent the motive is both deeply personal and meticulously planned. Can Roy outsmart the brazen killer orchestrating this elaborate quest for vengeance before another innocent life is lost?
3	"You Are Dead"	Dan Zeff	Tony Marchant	16 July 2024 (United States); 15 September 2024 (United Kingdom)	4.96
Grace and Branson are thrown into what is possibly their most disturbing and high-profile case yet, when workmen digging up a path by Hove Lagoon unearth a dark secret that was meant to stay buried for good. Meanwhile, across the city, what appears to be an isolated missing persons incident, soon becomes an investigation bigger than Grace could ever have imagined, when a barely visible yet chilling detail linking the Lagoon discovery and the missing person case reveals that this is an investigation spanning back years and the perpetrator is only just getting started again. As the victim count increases and a wave of growing unease spreads through the city of Brighton as to when and where the perpetrator will strike next, Grace and his team face a pressure like never before as they desperately hunt a sinister and supremely intelligent serial offender, who has evaded justice for far too long, in a race to save an innocent life.
4	"Love You Dead"	Kate Saxon	Jess Williams	23 July 2024 (United States); 22 September 2024 (United Kingdom)	5.01
A Brighton burglar is found dead in his car. His wife claims he reformed, but evidence suggests he was breaking and entering when killed. Grace's team investigates while Roy aids US police tracing a woman from Brighton tied to a mafia hit.

=== Series 5 (2025) ===
No.	Title	Directed by	Written by	Original release date	UK viewers (millions)
1	"Dead If You Don’t"	Jon Jones	Jess Williams	6 April 2025	5.97
When a man is found dead in a barrel on a Sussex beach and a bomb threat targets a packed Brighton football match, Grace and his team race to stop a catastrophic attack while Roy, at the stadium with Bruno, is pulled into a desperate fight to save hundreds of lives. As evidence links the beach victim, the bomber, and a wealthy family in the stands, Grace uncovers a web of organised crime.
2	"Dead At First Sight"	Jon East	Guy Burt	13 April 2025	6.06
When a man found dead in a hotel turns out to be using an alias, Grace’s team uncovers two compelling suspects whose stories don’t quite align. Then, two initially unrelated deaths provide the missing puzzle piece. Grace’s team is thrown into an online world where they find a tangled web of mistaken identity and catfishing.
3	"Need You Dead"	Nirpal Bhogal	Caroline Carver	20 April 2025	5.97
When a woman is found murdered in what first appears to be a break‑in gone wrong, Grace quickly realises the scene has been staged, especially after discovering that only her phone and laptop were taken while valuables were left untouched. As he digs into Hannah Belling’s life—a former psychiatrist with a mental‑health app—multiple suspects emerge, from an acrimonious ex‑husband to a fired stalker‑employee, a missing brother with a criminal past, and a secret lover, and a chilling forensic clue ultimately reveals that her death is tied to a far more sinister secret than anyone expected.
4	"Find Them Dead"	Imogen Murphy	Ed Whitmore	27 April 2025	5.51
Grace’s team gets involved in the high‑stakes trial of the drug lord “The Merchant”. There are suspicions of members of the jury being coerced into manipulating the outcome of the trial, which makes Roy Grace himself get in a little too deep and take questionable risks that might destabilise the court case.

=== Series 6 (2026) ===
No.	Title	Directed by	Written by	Original release date	UK viewers (millions)
1	"Left You Dead"	Nirpal Bhogal	Guy Burt	29 March 2026	5.91
Roy Grace and his team are still dealing with the fallout from Cassian Pewe’s betrayal while navigating an ongoing internal investigation. A new case lands in their lap, involving the disappearance of Eden, whose life may be tangled in her husband’s secrets. As the evidence twists in unexpected directions, Roy must determine what’s real and who he can trust in a case where everyone is hiding something.
2	"Capture You Dead"	John Hay	Caroline Carver	5 April 2026	5.02
As Grace and Branson work to verify Cassian’s claims about Sandy’s murder, the discovery of student Charlie Downing’s body pulls the team into a university full of fear, secrets, and hidden motives. As evidence reveals a deeper truth and a killer desperate to keep it buried, Grace races to solve the case before one of his own pays the price.
3	"Dead Man's Game"	Dan Zeff	Ed Whitmore	12 April 2026	4.97
Grace and Bella investigate the stabbing of teenager Chris Perkins on a council estate tied to Roy’s past, raising doubts about whether the crime is really drug‑related as it first appears. Meanwhile, Branson and Nick pursue a violent armed‑robbery crew, and as both cases collide with old enemies and buried secrets, the team uncovers a revelation that puts one of their own in serious danger.
4	"One of Us Is Dead"	Miranda Howard-Williams	Guy Burt	19 April 2026	TBA
As Grace’s team reels from recent events, a fatal hit‑and‑run involving hotelier Bryson Lambert pulls Roy into a far more complex and sinister mystery than it first appears, exposing a criminal underworld desperate to keep its secrets buried. While Vee confronts her estranged father and Roy prepares for his wedding, a devastating turn threatens to upend everything.

== Home media ==
Home media releases for Grace
Series	Region 2 DVDs	Region 4 DVDs
1	—N/a	31 August 2022
1–2	30 May 2022	—N/a
2	—N/a	7 June 2023
3	22 May 2023	22 May 2024
1-3	22 May 2023	—N/a
4	7 October 2024	12 May 2025
1-4	7 October 2024	—N/a
5	12 May 2025	—N/a
1-5	12 May 2025	—N/a
6	18 May 2026	—N/a
1-6	18 May 2026	—N/a
