= Herta Groves =

Herta Groves

Herta "Georgette" Groves (April 1920 – 27 April 2016) was an Austrian-born British milliner who made hats for Queen Elizabeth II.

== Early life ==
Groves grew up in Vienna, the daughter of Jewish parents, Wilhelm and Amelia. Her father died of pneumonia which he caught after being forced at gunpoint to shovel snow from the streets of Vienna, and her mother and younger sister Alice died in a Latvian concentration camp in 1942.

== Life in Britain ==
Groves emigrated to Britain and founded the London Hat Company, creating hats based on her own couture designs. The firm was successful and made hats for Queen Elizabeth II. Groves was married twice, and lived in St John's Wood.

Groves died on 27 April 2016, aged 96, after being knocked down by a lorry following a concert at London's Wigmore Hall.

== See also ==
- Arnold Fulton
- Cornelia James (glovemaker)
