= Southern Hospice Group =

Hospice group in Sussex, England

- Merger of: Martlets Hospice, St. Barnabas Hospices
- Type: Non-profit
- Registration no.: 256789
- Region served: Sussex
- Services: End-of-life care (Hospices)
- CEO: Stuart Palma

The Southern Hospice Group is a hospice group based in Sussex and East Hampshire formed in 2024 after the merger of St Barnabas Hospices (itself a merger of two hospices) with Martlets Hospice. Stuart Palma was announced as the CEO.

== Structure ==
Each hospice operates under the original name with the charity shops operating under the name of the hospice that it operated under prior to the mergers.

== St Barnabas Hospices ==
St Barnabas is a hospice in Worthing, established as St Barnabas Nursing Home in 1968. It is a registered charity (no. 256789). The hospice provides end-of-life care and rehabilitation services for life-limiting conditions to people in the Worthing, Adur, Arun and Henfield areas.

Bernard Marmaduke Fitzalan-Howard, 16th Duke of Norfolk was the hospice's first president, followed by Lavinia Fitzalan-Howard, Duchess of Norfolk in 1975 after his death. The hospice building opened in 1972, with two 12 bedded ward rooms and additional single rooms, with family rooms being later added in 1992. In 1995 the name was changed to St Barnabas Hospice to more accurately reflect the divers age ranges of patients. Lady Sarah Clutton became the hospice's president after her mother Lavinia's death in 1995

The hospice's first charity shop opened in 1989, with further shops opening throughout the 1990s, 2000s and 2010s. The hospice moved to a new location in 2011. In 2016 Henry Fitzalan Howard took over as president after Lady Sarah Clutton's death. The hospice's patrons and ambassadors include Margaret Bambford OBE former Deputy Lieutenant of West Sussex, Sir Nick Gibb former MP and Tim Loughton MP.

=== Chestnut Tree House ===
Chestnut Tree House is a children's hospice in Arundel. Founded in October 1997 as the Chestnut Tree Trust, the hospice provides care for children with life-threatening conditions in East and West Sussex and South East Hampshire.

The Trust started working with the Trustees of St Barnabas just under a year later in April 1998. With St Barnabas House providing some of the funding and care initially. Work on Chestnut Tree House began in 2001 after Lady Sarah Clutton donated the land, with the building opening in 2003.

In 2002 the first charity shop opened, with more opening through the 00s and 10s. Patrons and Ambassadors of Chestnut Tree House include Peter Andre, Chesney Hawkes, Jodie Kidd, Joe Stilgoe, Julia Donaldson, Julie Graham as well as patrons and ambassadors of St Barnabas.

== Martlets Hospice ==
Martlets Hospice is a hospice in Hove, England, established in 1997 following the merger of three separate charities. These were: Tarner, which opened in 1935; Coppercliff, which opened in 1967; and the MacMillan Day Hospice. It is a registered charity (no. 802145). The hospice provides end-of-life care to people in the Brighton and Hove area.

The hospice is named after the mythical Sussex bird, a Martlet, which also appears in the Sussex crest.

The hospice provides care in the hospice building, which has 18 beds and in peoples' homes in Brighton and Hove and surrounding areas including Newhaven and Peacehaven. Care is provided free for adults aged over the age of 18 who have terminal illnesses including cancer, motor neurone disease, parkinsons and alzheimers.

The hospice is not part of the National Health Service, although reports that just under one third of its funding comes from the NHS. Patients need to be referred to the hospice by a health professional.

The hospice patron is HM Lord Lieutenant Peter Field. Ambassadors for the charity include Carol Harrison, Fatboy Slim and Peter James. Other notable supporters include TV Vet Marc Abraham, who campaigned for Lucy's Law in the United Kingdom.

The hospice cared for the Architects guitarist Tom Searle, who died in the hospice in 2016. In response to the care provided, the band held a fundraiser for the hospice, raising over £19,000. British glovemaker Corneila James died in the hospice in 1999, her son is the crime author Peter James, who remains as a patron and supporter of the charity today.

== Art trails ==
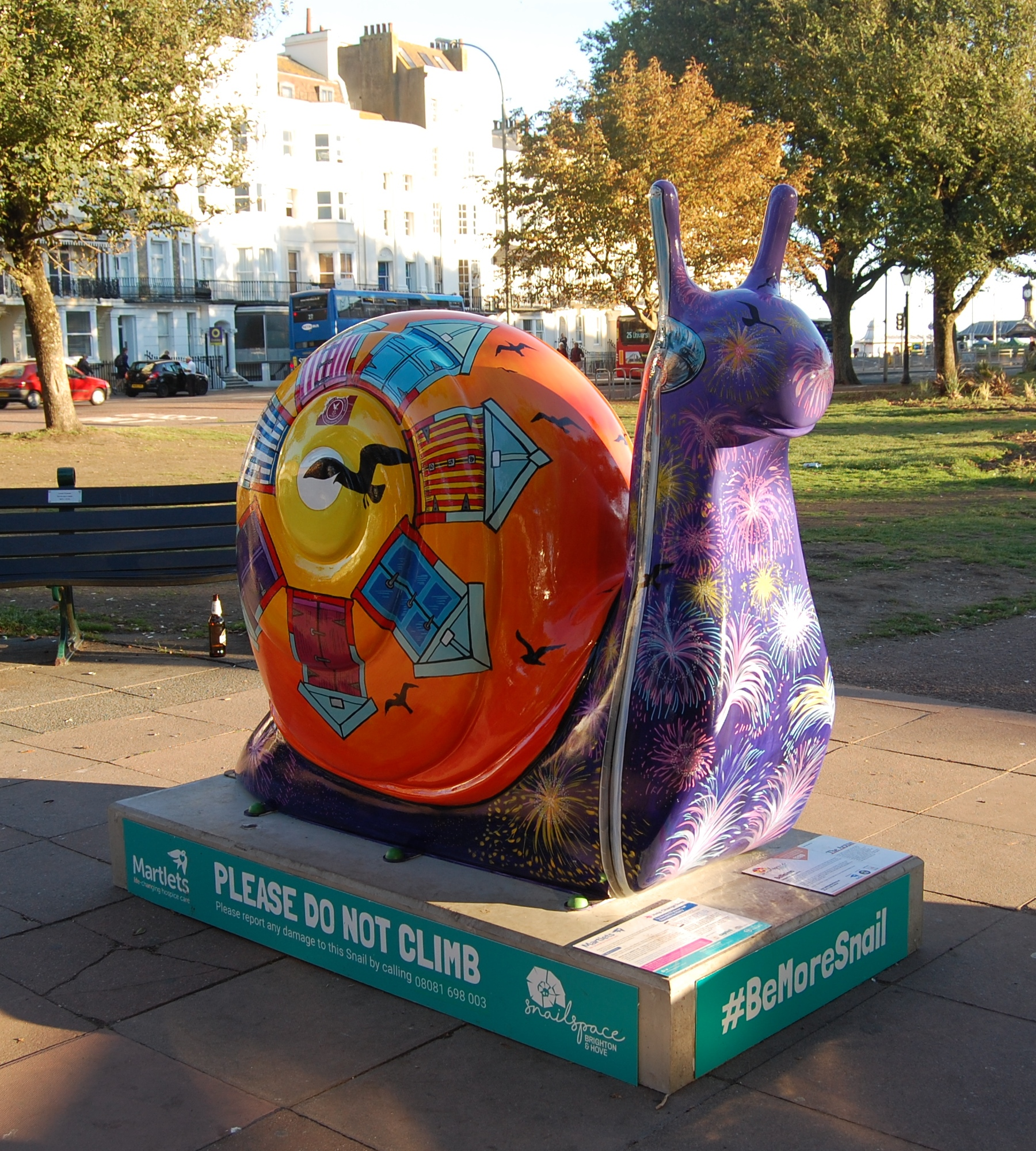
SnailSpace snail sculpture in Old Steine, Brighton

In 2016, Martlets held 'Snowdogs by the Sea', a Snowdogs Art Trails in Brighton and Hove arranged by Wild In Art. They placed nearly 50 Snowdog sculptures throughout the city, designed by artists, which were then auctioned. It raised £337,000 for the charity.

Following the success of the first trail, Martlets organised Snailspace in 2018. Brighton-based YouTuber Alfie Deyes, crime writer Peter James and DJ Fatboy Slim all sponsored Snails in the trail. As part of the event, Fatboy Slim walked round all 50 Snails to raise funds for the charity. At the end of the trail, the Snails were sold at auction for £231,400.

In 2023, the art trails returned for one year with Shaun the Sheep sculptures within Brighton and Hove. As for previous years these sculptures were then actioned raising £385,000. Although some of the 42 statues were removed from public places due to acts of vandalism, with at least 10 of them having been damaged by vandalism.

In 2024, Chestnut Tree House also in collaboration with Wild In Art held 'The Big Hoot' a trail of large owl sculptures around Chichister and Arundel, raising a total of more than £150,000. Simultaneously all Chestnut Tree House charity shops sold owl themed merchandise as part of the fundraising event.
