= Cornelia James (company) =

- Industry: Clothing retailer
- Founded: 1946
- Headquarters: London
- Key people: Cornelia James (Founder); Genevieve James Lawson (Director)
- Products: Gloves
- Website: www.corneliajames.com

Cornelia James is a firm of British glovemakers, founded in 1946, and with a Royal Warrant since 1979. The company has been managed by Genevieve James Lawson, daughter of the late Cornelia James, since 1999.

== History ==
Cornelia Katz was born in Vienna in 1917, and left in 1939 via Paris to London to try to get a United States visa, but met Jack James and married him six weeks later in 1940. She was a Jewish refugee and set up business in London in 1946 making gloves. In 1947, Norman Hartnell asked her to make the "going-away" gloves for The Princess Elizabeth after her marriage to Prince Philip.

In the 1950s, the company had 250 employees in a former dairy in Brighton. Cornelia James died in 1999, at the age of 82.

== Activities ==
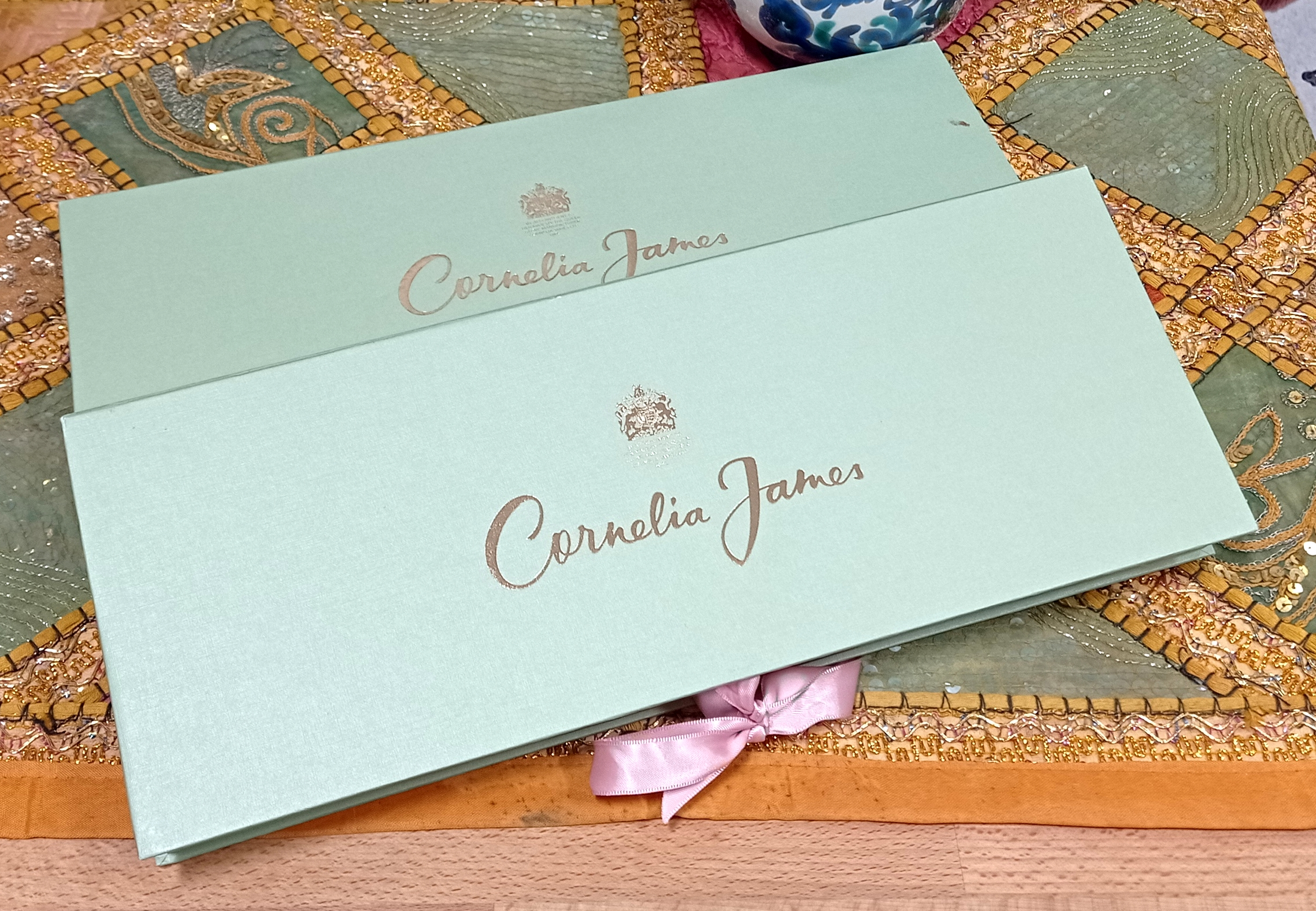
Cornelia James gloves box

Cornelia James has been Royal Warrant holders since 1979, and is now based in Lewes, Sussex.

The company is now run by her daughter, Genevieve James Lawson, who's also the brand's creative director. The company's range of products includes cotton gloves, merino wool gloves, leather gloves, opera gloves, and ski mitts. Notable clients have included Queen Elizabeth II, Queen Elizabeth the Queen Mother, Diana, Princess of Wales, Catherine, Duchess of Cambridge, Anne, Princess Royal, Princess Beatrice, Princess Eugenie, Rihanna, Taylor Swift, Lady Gaga, Kate Moss and Madonna. Japan is the company's best customer. They also have provided gloves for numerous entertainment productions, including The Crown, Downton Abbey and Mamma Mia. In the midst of the COVID-19 pandemic in 2020, the company partnered with HeiQ Materials AG to create "silver based anti viral technology", which is applied to the fabric of their gloves as an antimicrobial protection against the coronavirus.

== Related pages ==
- Cornelia James (glovemaker)
