= Snowdog Art Trails =

Series of public art exhibitions

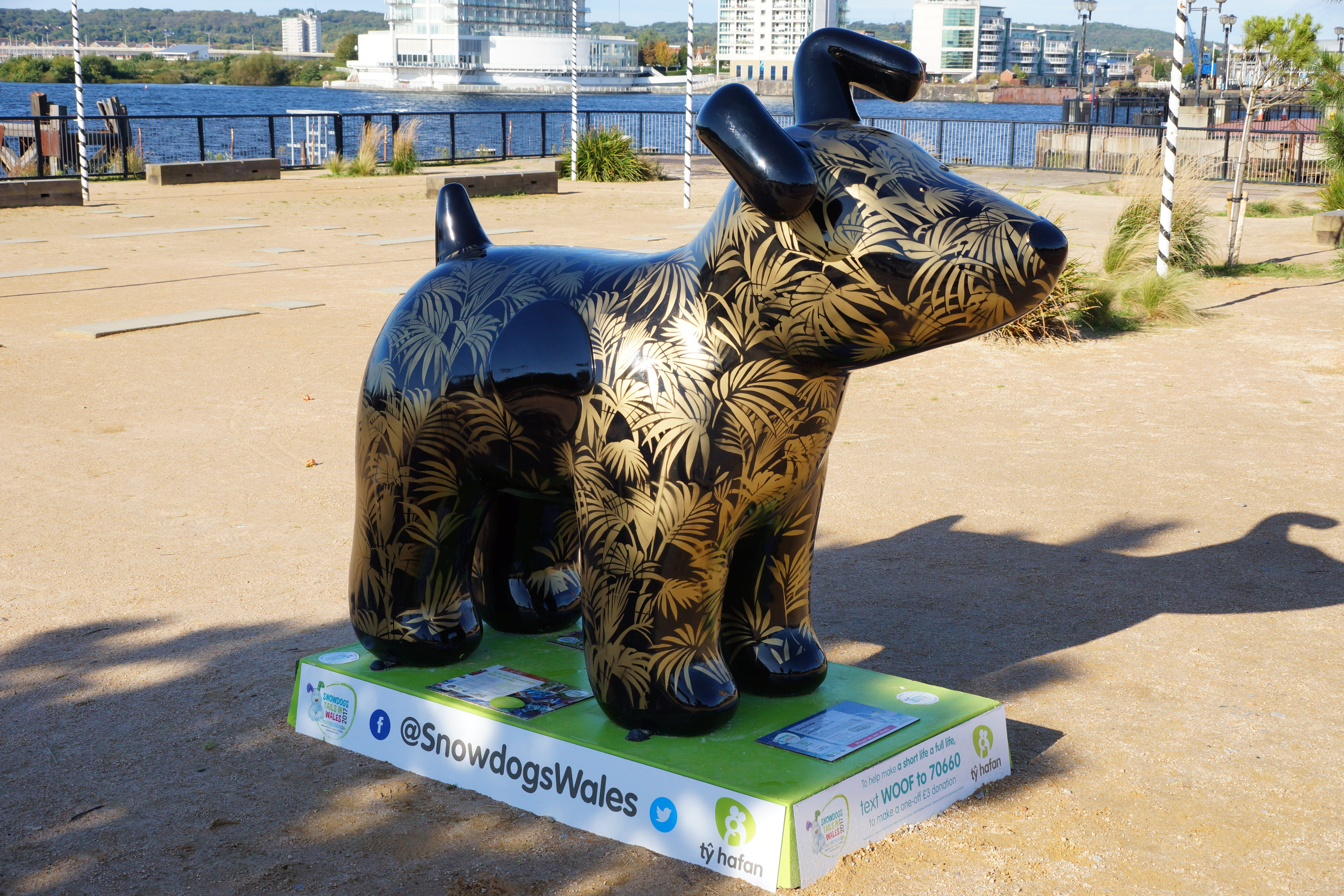
"Honolulu", one of the dogs from the Snowdogs Tails in Wales trail

The Snowdog Art Trails are a series of public art exhibitions of large Snowdog sculptures, organised by Wild In Art from 2016 to 2018. They celebrate the Snowdog from the 2012 short film, The Snowman and the Snowdog, and feature sculptures painted in a wide variety of styles, many of which reflect the area in which the dogs are displayed. In addition to large fibreglass Snowdogs, the exhibitions have also featured smaller Snowpups, decorated by and, after the event, given to local primary schools.

The trails are supported with maps and apps, allowing visitors to keep track of which Snowdogs they've found. For the Ashford trail, visitors were able to enter codes found by each Snowdog into an app, unlocking rewards such as money off vouchers, free pens, and badges.

== Aim of the trails ==
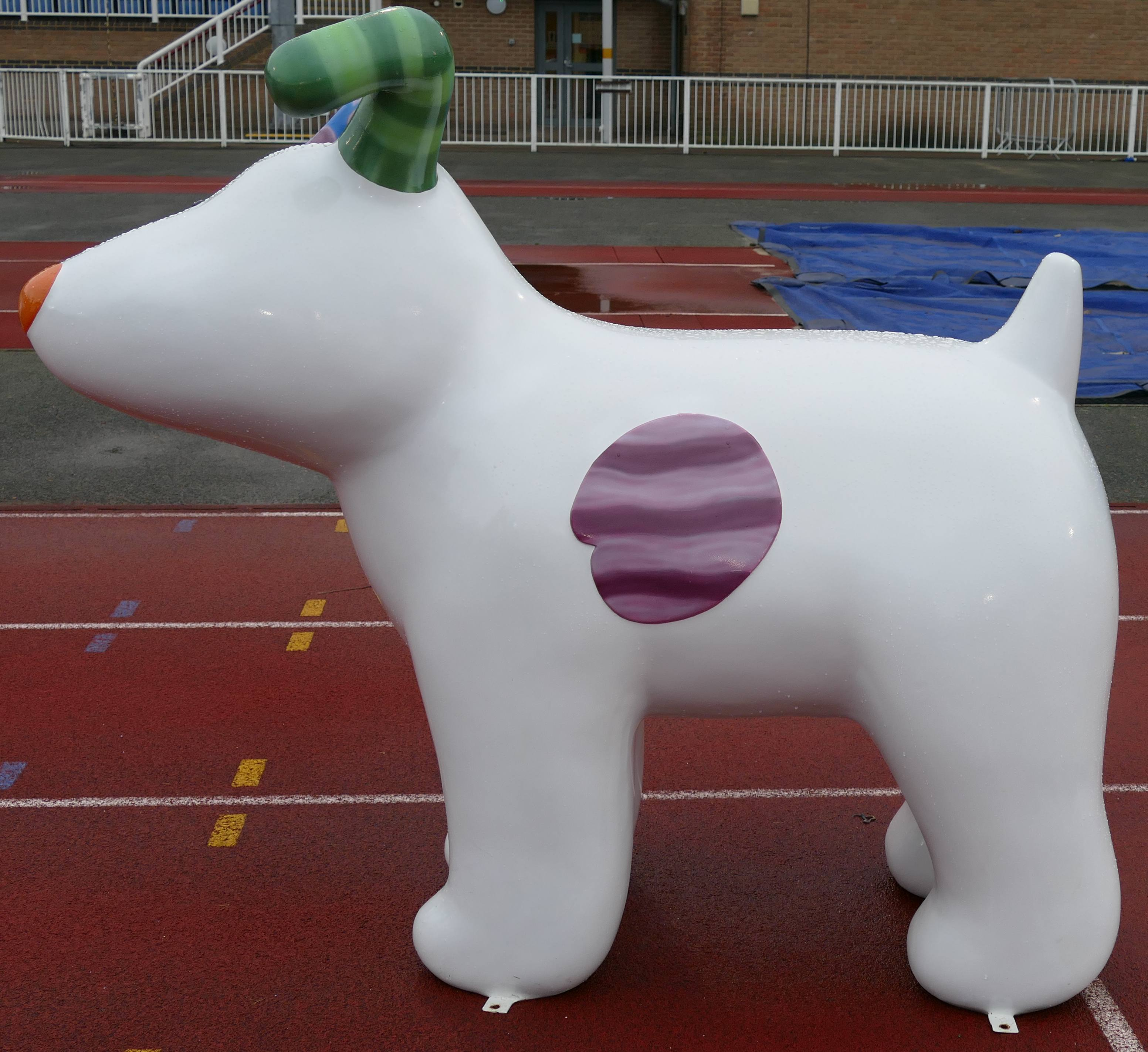
"The Snowdog" (also known as "Classic") has appeared at all the Snowdog Art Trails so far.

The aim of the trails are to encourage people to explore their local area, spending time in the town or city and perhaps visiting places they wouldn't normally go to. The trails also attract visitors from outside the area, bringing extra money into the local economy. In addition, funds are raised for local hospices by selling merchandise and, at the end of the exhibition, the Snowdogs themselves via auction.

== Great North Snowdogs (2016) ==
Over 50 Snowdogs were created for an art trail which spanned Newcastle and Tyne & Wear. The exhibition ran between 19 September – 20 November 2016 and funds were raised for St Osmond's Hospice. A farewell weekend, with the dogs gathered in one place, was held on 2 December to 4 December, with an auction following on 6 December. The auction raised over £250,000 for the hospice, with two dogs (Disco Dog and Guide Dog) fetching over £9,000 each.

List of Great North Snowdogs auctioned on 6 December 2016

This table shows the lots in the post-exhibition auction of the Great North Snowdogs, together with their hammer price and, if known, where they ended up. Details are taken from the live stream of the auction, which is archived on YouTube.

Lot Number	Snowdog Name	Artist	Sale price (GBP)	What happened next?
1	Arthur	Jeff Rowland	5200	Sold to a private buyer
2	Rosa Canina	Sue Guthrie Rosa	2500	
3	Dog Of The Tyne	Jane Headford	4000	
4	Mojo	Sumit Sarkar	2300	
5	Luna	Geoff Chappell	5100	
6	Sparky	David Sith	5200	
7	Es Tu Cosa	Tristan Lathey	3500	
8	Patchwork	Jill Barklem	3000	Bought by Mini Moos Farm for public display
9	Guide Dog	Mike Clay	9000	On public display in the South Shields ferry waiting room
10	Frostbite	Charlotte Mitchell	3200	Bought by Mini Moos Farm for public display
11	Pink Is The New Black	Lee Stafford	2800	
12	Spocky Dog	Hilary Sanderson	3600	
13	Snowline	Jim Edwards	5800	
14	Tails Of The Sea	Joanna Wishart	3800	
15	Moji (a Snowpup)	Edgar Ameti	2500	
16	WOOF-3000	Sophie Green	1900	
17	Chilly Dog	Sally Adams	5000	
18	Ziggy	Marcus Brown	3800	
19	Day Of The Dog	Sophie Green	2000	
20	Fear Of Emptiness	Louise Bradley	2500	
21	Snow Angel Of The North	Mike Richardson	5000	
22	Springtime	Joanna Lumley and Sarah-Jane Richards	4100	
23	Tails Of The North East	David Maguire	2500	
24	Addam Upright	Time Miness	4000	
25	Rocket Dog	Amanda Rabey	3300	On public display at the ticket concourse at the Central Metro station, Newcastle
26	Rosy Posy	Sarah Jane Richards	5200	
27	Aero-Dog	Deven Bhurke	3400	
28	Psychedelic Snowdog	Rebecca Reed	4000	
29	Moondog (a Snowpup)	Daniel Stone	3600	
30	Snowdog Down The Rabbit Hole	Heather Penten	4000	
31	Hadrian's Hound	Catherine J Bell	3000	
32	Graffiti Dog	Frank Styles	3000	
33	The Snowdog	Anonymous	5400	
34	Mutt Me On The Corner	Lindesfarne and Edgar Ameti	4000	
35	Tyne Tail Jack	Corinne Lewis-Ward	6500	
36	Houndstooth	Damien Jeffery	3400	
37	Wonderhound	Illona Clark	4000	
38	Rhino The Rescue	Leighton Denny	2200	
39	Decisions Decisions Decisions	Julia Roxburgh	3500	
40	Great North Polar Pooch	Sandra Jaekel-Bothyart	4000	
41	Dog On The Groyne	Jenny Leonard	5500	
42	Hound Dog	Lee O'Brien	3200	
43	Essence Of The North	Geoff Chappell	2400	
44	Spottydog (a Snowpup)	Mike Clay	5000	
45	Gingerbread Dog	Sarah-Jane Szikora	5600	
46	Squares	Deven Bhurke	3300	
47	Rover Codex	Ellie Tarratt	3500	
48	Gizmo	Anonymous	4500	
49	Disco Dog	Natalie Guy	9200	
50	Hiding Lions	Helen Stephens	3000	
51	Patchwork Northumberland	Daniel J. Weatheritt	4500	
52	The Dog Father	Jenny Leonard	3700	
53	Winter Lily	Sarah-Jane Richards	3100	
54	Wor Geordie	Newcastle College	4500	
55	Roodle	Isy Langhorne	3100	
56	Wild North East	Jina Gelder	7000	Returned to its sponsor, St Oswald's Hospice, after a fundraising appeal.
57	Rock Dog (a Snowpup)	Sarah-Jane Szikora	3500	
58	Skipper	Joanne Wishart	4000	
59	Shaggy Dog Stories	Chris Riddell	4200	
60	Dogfish	Pam Royle	4600	
61	The Snowbrador	Ruby Cooper	3500	
62	Snowberry	Simon Tozer	4600	
63	SAFC Spraydog	Frank Styles	3700	
64	Newcastle, United, Inspired	Temper Newcastle	8600	

== Snowdogs by the Sea (2016) ==
While the Great North Snowdogs trail was underway, a second trail was launched at the other end of England in the south coast resort of Brighton and Hove. As with the northern exhibition, snowdogs were placed around the city and they remained there from 24 September to 27 November 2016. A total of 44 Snowdogs and 22 smaller Snowpups were on display. Over 5,000 visitors attended the farewell weekend (held on 4 and 5 December). An auction was held on 6 December in aid of Martlets Hospice in Hove and this raised £337,000. The highest priced dogs were Max, at £22,000 and Boomer, at £20,000.

List of Brighton Snowdogs auctioned on 6 December 2016

This table shows the lots in the post-exhibition auction of the Brighton Snowdogs, together with their hammer price and, if known, where they ended up. Details are taken from the Brighton and Hove news website.

Lot Number	Snowdog Name	Artist	Sale price (GBP)	What happened next?
1	Bow Wow	Mike Edwards	7500	
2	Rose	Deven Bhurke	7500	
3	Blot the Dog	IownthisART (Jason McQuillen)	6500	
4	Roodle	Isy Langhorne	6000	
5	Koinu Yakuza	Soheila Jones	3800	
6	Splashhound	Lawrence Art Supplies Creative Team	4500	
7	Pebbles	Joanna Martin	5200	Sold to a private buyer
8	Lola	Deven Bhurke	5200	
9	Brighton Belle	Jenny Leonard	8500	
10	Clifton	Chalk Gallery	6000	
11	Brighton Rock (Rocco)	Pinky	4200	
12	The Snowbrador	Ruby Cooper	5000	
13	Newshound	Heidi Compton	5000	
14	Bobby	Katherine Griffin	6500	
15	Winter Lily	Sarah Jane Richards	4800	
16	Merry – Go – Hound	Sean Sims	4200	
17	Mod Dog	Steve Mason	9500	
18	Bella	Chris Dawson	8500	Purchased by OneFamily Financial Services; on display in their offices.
19	Palace Pup	Maria and Patricia Shrigley	5500	
20	Patch – The Unfinished Quilt	Judith Berrill	5800	
21	Dudley	Louise Dear	4200	
22	Disco Dog	Natalie Guy	12000	Bought by Skerritts Chartered Financial Planners
23	Sparky	David Sith	8500	
24	Process Pup	Josh Ford (The Osh)	6000	Purchased via crowdfunding; on public display at Hanover Centre Garden
25	Dave The Dog	Totally Dynamic	7500	Sold to the Hove Place Pub, on display in their garden
26	Bone China	Gemma Compton	8500	Bought by Bright Blue Wealth Coastal, on display in their reception area
27	Seagulls of the South	Kathleen Smith	6500	
28	Southdowns Dog	Kellie Miller	6000	
29	Legal Beagle	Kip Devore McCullough	5500	
30	Frank	Jane Anderson	8000	
31	Marty	David Halliwell	5200	
32	Gizmo	Anonymous	9500	
33	GRRRace	Mik Richardson	13000	
34	Smart Vibes	Pinky	4500	
35	Under the Sea	Lynne Bannon	6500	
36	Neon Camo Snowdog of Hope	Mike Edwards	8000	
37	Smiley	Sophy Henn	15000	
38	Snowman's Nightmare	Pure Evil	8000	
39	Flower	Kai & Sunny	11000	
40	Max	Sarah Arnett	22000	
41	Crush Puppy	Louise Dear	5500	
42	Horatio – The Bathing Beauty	Judith Berrill	8000	
43	Boomer	RYCA	20000	
44	The Snowdog	Anonymous	9000	

== Snowdogs Tails in Wales (2017) ==
The Snowdogs returned for a second year, this time in Cardiff, Wales. A total of 43 Snowdogs were placed around the Welsh capital during the autumn of 2017, with the trail running from 16 September to 26 November. Members of the public were able to view them all together at the farewell weekend of 8 December to 10 December. The dogs were auctioned off on 12 December, with proceeds going to the Tŷ Hafan hospice. A total of £121,000 was raised for the charity, with the highest-earning dogs being Enfys, at £6,100 and Snow Tiger, at £5,100.

List of Welsh Snowdogs auctioned on 12 December 2017

This table shows the lots in the post-exhibition auction of the Welsh Snowdogs, together with their hammer price and, if known, where they ended up. Details are taken from the Snowdogs Tails in Wales Facebook page and their main website.

Lot Number	Snowdog Name	Artist	Sale price (GBP)	What happened next?
1	Dog Bot	Mark Chilcott	2300	
2	Hus-Quay	Rachel Blackwell	2000	
3	Starry Night	Benjamin Fowler and Heather Penten	2400	
4	Snow Business	Nat Clements	2100	
5	Life's a Beach	Emma Everitt	4100	
6	Heatwave	Andy O'Rourke	3100	
7	Pop Pup	Damien Jeffries	2900	
8	Maple	Paul Williams	1900	
9	Smileosaurus (a Snowpup)		2500	
10	Chocolate Sundae	Simon Tozer	2400	
11	Hygge	Deven Bhurke	2100	
12	Enfys	Rhiannon Roberts	6100	
13	Lunar Rover	Mik Richardson	2300	
14	Butterfly Coat	Sarah Cowan	1600	
15	Roodle	Izy Langhorne	1800	
16	OMG Dog	Phil Morgan	2100	
17	Snow Dragon	Dorian Spencer Davies	4100	
18	Baffi	Judith Berrill	3000	
19	Cedric	Pete Fowler	3200	
20	Classic Snowdog	Anonymous	2000	
21	Candy Stripes	Lowri Davies	2700	
22	Blackberry	Simon Tozer	2400	
23	Rosy Posy	Sarah Jane Richards	2100	
24	Oscar	Maria Shrigley	2600	
25	Me Is Who I Am	Gemma Fala	2100	
26	Dog With A Bone	Gemma Williams	2100	
27	RESOLVED	George O’Dowd and Phil Morgan	1500	
28	Local Lad	Dale Edna Evans	4200	
29	Plentyn	Vikki Cornish	4000	
30	That Snow Tiger	Emily Ketteringham	5100	
31	Sun Dog	Seth Oliver	2500	
32	Sparky	David Sith	4100	
33	Big Dog Little Dogs	Jim Medway	1700	
34	Happy Taffy	Traci Moss	1300	
35	Honolulu	Julien MacDonald	2700	
36	Summer Meadow	Alison Underwood	4000	
37	McCoo	Steven Brown	2700	
38	Anthem	Dale Edna Evans	3100	
39	Castles And Dragons	Rachel Blackwell	4400	
40	The Snowbrador	Ruby Cooper	2400	
41	Gizmo	Anonymous	2600	
42	Dino Dog	Jenny Leonard	2300	
43	Sheep Dog		2100	
44	Apple Sourz		2600	

== Snowdogs Discover Ashford (2018) ==
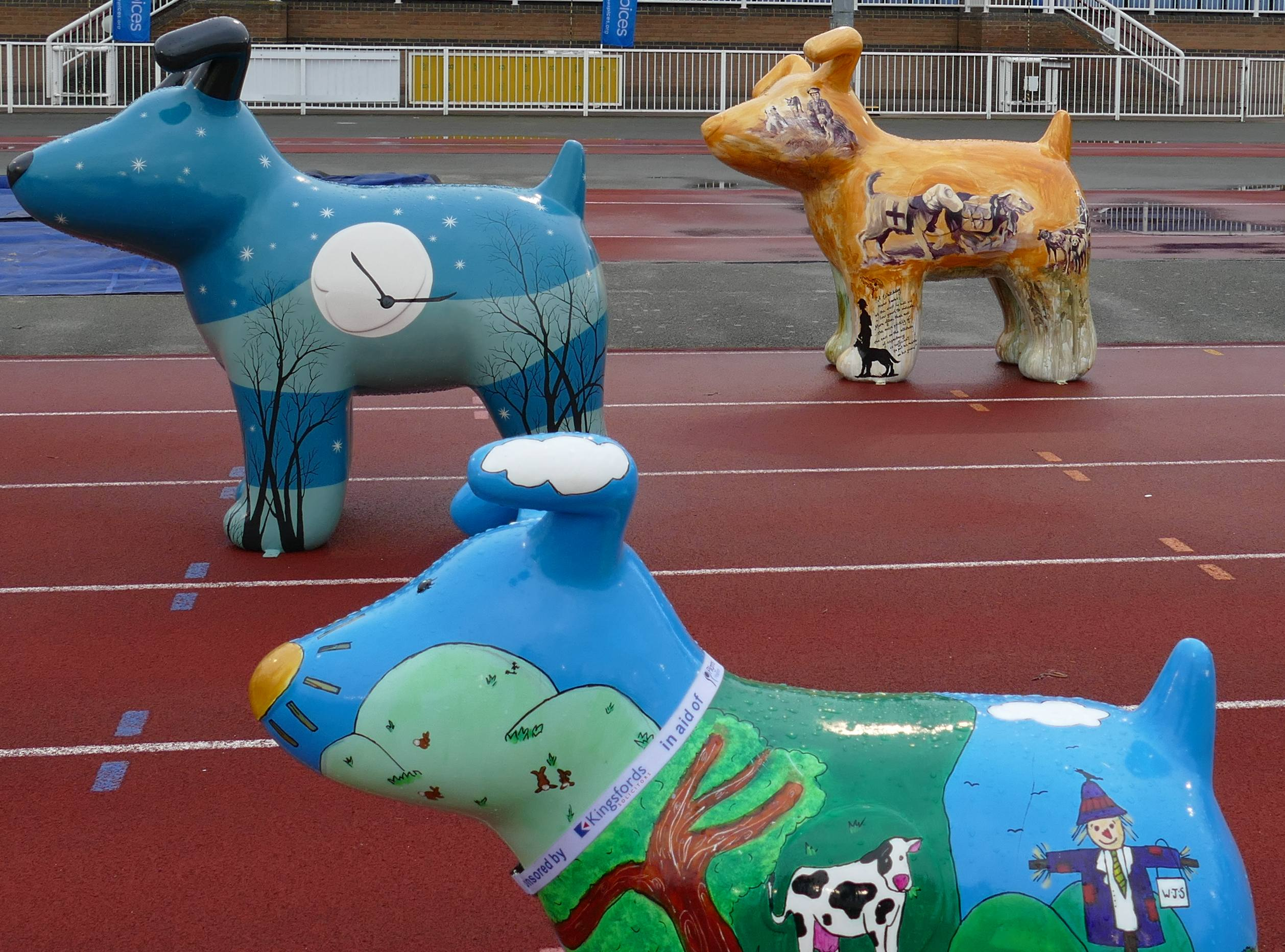
"Zeus", "Lest We Forget The Wardogs", and "Wilbur", from the Snowdogs Discover Ashford trail

The fourth exhibition saw 35 Snowdogs and 19 Snowpups laid out on a 4-mile trail through and around Ashford, Kent. The exhibition ran from 12 September – 18 November 2018, with a farewell weekend taking place on 1 and 2 December. An auction of the Snowdogs and two Snowpups took place on 3 December, raising £142,000 for Pilgrims Hospices. The highest-selling Snowdogs were Doodle Dog, at £15,000 and Bagdogg, at £9,000.

The 35 Snowdogs include designs based on, amongst others, ash trees, from which Ashford derives its name; a Kentish oast house, the Ashford coat of arms, the infinity symbol (invented by an Ashfordian), and a dog decorated by Mr Doodle (Sam Cox).

A protester caused a local uproar when he launched a successful challenge to the location of Infinity Dog, which was placed in the churchyard of St Mary's Church. The complainant alleged that the dog was not in keeping with the surroundings and, after receiving the complaint, the Registrar of the Ecclesiastical Court ruled the dog be removed. It was relocated nearby, but a successful counter-campaign by the Rev John MacKenzie of the town parish overturned the decision. However, there wasn't enough time to restore the Snowdog to the church as the decision came too close to the end of the trail.

List of Ashford Snowdogs auctioned on 3 December 2018

This table shows the lots in the post-exhibition auction of the Ashford Snowdogs, together with their hammer price and, if known, where they ended up. Details are taken from the post-auction catalogue.

Lot Number	Snowdog Name	Artist	Sale price (GBP)	What happened next?
1	Sakura	Sian Storey	2300	
2	Sparky	David Sith	3100	
3	Give A Dog A Bone	Oliver Winconek	2000	
4	My Very Best Jumper	Steffany Malone	2400	Bought by the Picturehouse Cinema, Ashford, for public display
5	Gizmo	Anonymous	3300	Sold to a private buyer
6	2 Tone Ska Dog	John Sims	5200	Sold to a private buyer
7	Topuppy	Gregory Daines	1600	Sold to a private buyer
8	Socks	Victoria Robbins	2500	Sold to the County Square shopping centre, Ashford, for public display
9	Pawberry	Leah Pendleton	2900	Bought by its sponsor, Jenner Group
10	Harey Hound	Traci Moss	2000	Sold to Ashford Borough Council, for public display
11	Pow-wow	Jenny Leonard	2700	
12	Zeus	Emma Dove	6100	Sold to a private buyer
13	Lest We Forget The War Dogs	Lois Cordelia	2600	The buyer donated the Snowdog to Ashford Borough Council, for public display
14	Camo King	Kathryn Jordan	3000	Sold to its sponsors, Hodson Developments, and displayed at the Chilmington estate, Ashford
15	Dotty	Sophie Green	6000	Donated to Ashford Borough Council by the buyer, for public display
16	Chester	David Hover	2600	Sold to Charles Mac mortgage brokers, loaned to the Wyvern School
17	Harry Kanine	Fiona Taylor	6200	The Snowdog was donated by its buyer to Ashford Borough Council, for public display
18	Stripes	Deven Bhurke	7000	Sold to its sponsor, Quinn Estates
19	Infinity Dog	Jessica Holly Goodard	3000	Bought by Quinn Estates and donated to the John Wallis Academy
20	Winter Lily	Sarah Jane Richards	2800	
21	Pastel Harlequin	Catherine Digman	2600	
22	Doodle Dog	Mr Doodle	15000	Sold to its sponsor, Motorline
23	Autumnal Tumble	Sarah Underwood	2600	Sold to a private buyer and renamed to "Autumn"
24	Patch	Phillippa Goodard	2300	Sold to a private buyer
25	Bark Kent	Victoria Robbins	2400	
26	The Snowbrador	Ruby Cooper	5200	Sold to Quinn Estates and given an indefinite loan to the Ashford Visitor Information Centre
27	Wild Flower Meadow	Deborah Woodward	5000	Sold to Hodson Developments, its sponsor. Displayed for a time at the Chilmington estate in Ashford.
28	Bagdogg	Peter and Emily Fermin	9000	Sold to a private buyer
29	Made In Ash-Hound	Danielle Williamson	2800	Sold to Ashford Borough Council, for public display
30	Goldie	Lois Cordelia	3200	Sold to a private buyer
31	Oasty	Deven Bhurke	2700	
32	Noble Ash	Emma Dove	5500	Sold to the same buyer as Bagdogg
33	Parklife	Kathleen Smith	3600	Sold to the same buyer as Topuppy; loaned to Pilgrims Hospices for public display
34	Vincent Van Pooch	Beverley Fisher	3100	Bought by Ashford Council for public display
35	Classic	Anonymous	2600	
36	Snowy (a Snowpup)	Kaya Cook and Robyn Bailey	2100	On display at the Singleton Environment Centre in Ashford
37	Spotty (a Snowpup)	Kaya Cook and Robyn Bailey	2000	Sold to its sponsor, Motorline
