= Cornelia James (glovemaker) =

British glovemaker and businesswoman (1917–1999)

- Cornelia James at work
- Born: Cornelia Katz; 11 March 1917; Vienna, Austria
- Died: 10 December 1999 (aged 82); Hove, Sussex, England
- Education: Vienna Academy of Fine Arts
- Occupation: Glovemaker
- Known for: Founded Cornelia James
- Spouse: Jack James
- Children: Peter James; Genevieve Lawson

Cornelia James (née Katz; 11 March 1917 – 10 December 1999), was a British glovemaker and businesswoman. Born in Vienna, Austria, to a Jewish family, James emigrated to the United Kingdom during the Second World War and founded her eponymous firm of glovemakers in 1946, which now holds a Royal Warrant.

== Early life ==
Cornelia Katz was born on 11 March 1917, in Vienna, Austria, the eldest of seven children of a family who ran a chain of grocery shops and a cold storage business.

Katz studied fashion design at the Vienna Academy of Fine Arts before leaving Vienna in 1939 for Paris, and then London, with "a suitcase full of the coloured leather".

== Career ==
She arrived in London as a refugee but soon set up a business making gloves, founding her own brand in 1946. In 1947, she was asked by the dress designer Norman Hartnell to make the "going-away" gloves for the then-Princess Elizabeth to take on her honeymoon, following her marriage to Philip Mountbatten. James additionally made several pairs for the Princess's trousseau, beginning her lifelong association with the British royal family. In 1948, she became known as "the Colour Queen of England" after launching her leather gloves range in 100 different shades.

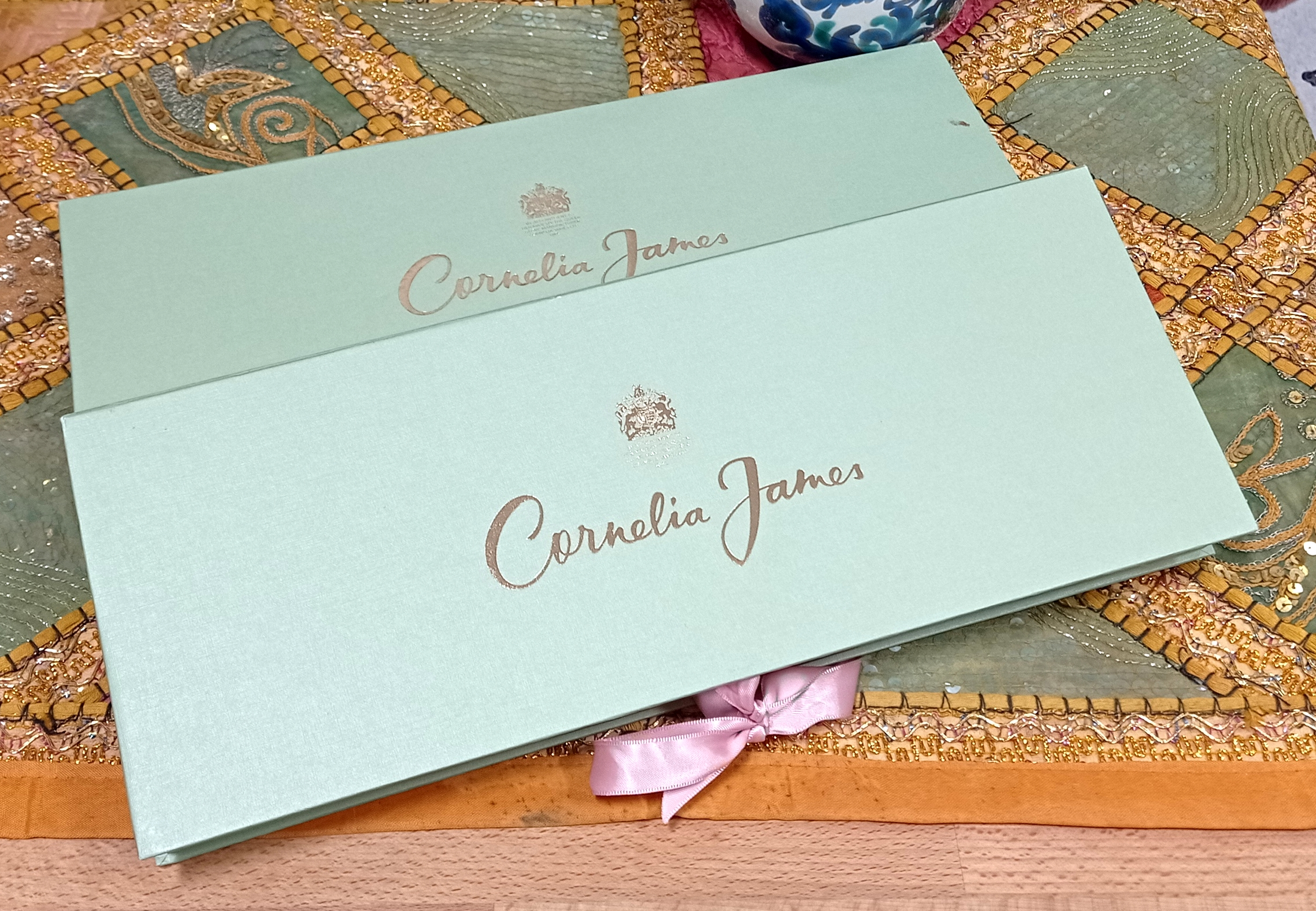
Cornelia James gloves box

Her first workshop was on Davigdor Road in Hove, near Brighton, and was established by 1947. The business peaked in the 1950s when she was known as "the Queen's favourite glovemaker" and had between 250 and 500 workers in her factory in a former dairy in Brighton; however, the popularity of wearing fashion gloves eventually declined. Her products remained popular with royalty, with Queen Elizabeth The Queen Mother, The Princess Royal and Diana, Princess of Wales among her clients, as well as members of the Belgian, Dutch and Swedish royal families. "Cornelia James" officially became Royal Warrant of Appointment holders in 1979, and subsequently operated as the Queen's official glovemaker.

== Personal life ==
After emigrating from Austria, she originally hoped to get a United States visa, but subsequently met Jack Burnett James and married him six weeks later, in 1940 (despite the fact that she had been engaged before leaving Vienna.) Their son Peter James (b. 1948) is a best-selling writer of crime fiction. Their daughter, Genevieve James Lawson, runs "Cornelia James". James had been an active supporter of hospices and other charities throughout her time in Sussex.

== Death ==
Cornelia James died at Martlets Hospice in Hove, Sussex, England, on 10 December 1999.

== See also ==
- Cornelia James (company)
- Arnold Fulton
- Herta Groves
