= Swinging Safari =

Swinging Safari may refer to:

- A Swingin' Safari, a 1962 album by Bert Kaempfert, featuring a single of the same name used as the theme music to the television game show Match Game
- Swinging Safari (film), a 2017 Australian film directed by Stephan Elliott
- "Swinging Safari", the first episode of Really Wild Animals
