= List of FLCL characters =

The cast of the first season of FLCL. From left to right: (top) Commander Amarao, Lieutenant Kitsurubami; (bottom) Shigekuni Nandaba, Masashi, Gaku, Kamon Nandaba, Canti, Haruko Haruhara, Naota Nandaba, Eri Ninamori, Mamimi Samejima

The central characters in FLCL (also known as Fooly Cooly), a 2000 Japanese anime produced by Gainax and Production I.G, with two additional seasons released in 2018, followed by two more seasons in 2023. The first season covers the story of a sixth grade student named Naota Nandaba whose life is greatly changed after he is run over by the mysterious alien troublemaker Haruko Haruhara. The second season covers the story of a seventh grade student named Hidomi Hibajiri whose life Haruko also intrudes on.

== Main characters ==
=== Haruko Haruhara ===
Haruko Haruhara
- FLCL character
- First appearance: Fooly Cooly
- Created by: Kazuya Tsurumaki
- Voiced by: Japanese: Mayumi Shintani; English: Kari Wahlgren

In-universe information
- Alias: None
- Species: Alien
- Gender: Female
- Occupation: None
- Affiliation: 1st Class Space Patrol Officer
- Nationality: Japanese

Haruko Haruhara (ハルハラ・ハル子, Haruhara Haruko), her actual name Haruha Raharu (ハルハ・ラハル), is a mysterious pink-haired alien girl who is the central character in the FLCL series and serves as the antagonistic catalyst for the abnormal events within the series, her goals mostly unknown save her obsessive desire to have Atomsk by absorbing him. She came to Earth years before the events of the first series and has history with Amarao, a deemed failure to her expectations. She is an energetic and unpredictably reckless sociopath who is nicknamed "Vespa Woman" for riding a sunglow Piaggio Vespa SS 180, claiming to be 19 and later 16 despite Mamimi's observation that she is 20. She displays knowledge of guitar types & American classic rock. Besides unlocking a human's N.O. abilities by kissing them, Haruko also has the ability to hypnotize weak-minded people into complying with her demands or believing anything she wants like having someone believe a bad drawing to be a photograph of a fabricated experience.

During the events of FLCL Alternative, claiming to represent the Galactic Space Patrol Brotherhood, Haruko directly antagonizes Medical Mechanica while entering Kana Koumoto's life to gauge the potential of her latent N.O. powers. From Kana's forehead she acquires a red 1968 model Fender Mustang, and she is not seen until the finale riding her signature Vespa SS 180, which is left in the care of noodle chef and occasional accomplice Dennis Yoga. Haruko aids and instigates Kana and her friends throughout the season, and is shown to have had a previous relationship with Tsukata Kanda of Interstellar Immigration, before having moved on when she was underwhelmed by his N.O. potential. Nonetheless, they team up in the finale "Full Flat". Haruko was ultimately sucked through the "Naked Focal Point", a giant wormhole opened by Kana unleashing her full power to end Medical Mechanica's apocalypse event. In the credits she is seen alongside her Vespa on another planet, FLCL Shoegaze revealing that she ended up in separate reality created by Kana's powers.

During the events of FLCL Grunge, a prequel to the first season, Haruko came to the mob-run town of Okura and infiltrates its infrastructure by taking the Kenshibishi Yakuza, one of the two mobs running the town, and poses as an escort to Mayor Kuroiwa, who has the Kenshibishi's rival Yakuza group in his services. But Haruko finds Shinpachi and awakens his N.O. abilities before arranging Medical Mechanica to be infected with a virus so she can steal Atomsk during the chaos brought about by the resulting mob war. She uses Shinpachi's NO Channel to acquire a weaponized midnight blue left-handed Rickenbacker bass guitar model 4001 that fire bullets and has axe and rocket launcher modes. But Atomsk escapes during the chaos, with Haruko hitching a ride on the Medical Mechanica plant as they chase him down to another planet.

During the first season of FLCL, having come to the planet years before and having a history with Amarao, a deemed failure to her expectations, Haruko arrives to Earth under the cover of an investigator for the Galactic Space Patrol Brotherhood to find a human with N.O. abilities to help her retrieve Atomsk from the clutches of Medical Mechanica. She eventually finds Naota and established the channel by hitting him with her guitar, moving into his household as a maid to keep tabs on him while her constant presence endangers him and others on a daily basis. Haruko has connections to the Nandaba family cat, Miyu Miyu, who serves as a "walkie talkie" to her superiors. The cat does not speak (besides its "meows" and grunts) but it is obvious that Haruko is getting some kind of reply, as her conversations with Miyu Miyu indicate. With even Amarao unaware of her full intentions, assuming Atomsk is a former lover, Haruko's played with Naota's feelings while endangering the Earth as part of her plan for Atomsk to fully manifest. But the plan backfires when Atomsk made Naota his host, with a furious Haruko attacking the boy before being incapacitated long enough for Atomsk to escape in the universe. Haruko appeared to forgive Naota in the aftermath while tenderly offering him to join her in tracking down Atomsk before retracting the offer, leaving her guitar behind and taking the double-necked guitar/bass that Naota created while harnessing Atomsk's power as her own. At the end of the manga adaptation, a character identical to Haruko appears from Naota's forehead and introduces herself as Haruha Raharu's boss Superior Raharu, hinting that Haruko is actually on the run from the Galactic Space Patrol Brotherhood.

Between the events of the first season and FLCL Progressive, as depicted in the latter's credits, Haruko manages to briefly absorb Atomsk years after leaving Naota. But the experience causes a part of Haruko's being to split off from her while losing Atomsk. The ordeal changed her hair orange while keeping the Gibson EB-0 component of Naota's double-necked guitar/bass, though Haruko remains adamant to capture Atomsk all over again. Returning to Earth under the guise of a homeroom teacher in Hidomi's school, Haruko uses the girl's classmate Ko Ide to weed out Hidomi as her target while being opposed by her discarded fragment in the form of Julia Jinyu. Haruko eventually devours Julia, restoring her original hair color, and focuses her full attention on a defiant Hidomi whom she provokes into attacking her just as Atomsk approaches Earth. Regaining her original guitar while continuing her fight with Hidomi, Haruko manages to absorb Atomsk before he and a possessed Julia separate from her as she emotionally breaks down from failing again. But Haruko quickly recovers from her loss and resumes her hunt for Atomsk.

=== Naota Nandaba ===
Naota Nandaba
- FLCL character
- First appearance: Fooly Cooly
- Created by: Kazuya Tsurumaki
- Voiced by: Japanese: Jun Mizuki; English: Barbara Goodson

In-universe information
- Alias: None
- Species: Human
- Gender: Male
- Occupation: None
- Affiliation: Mabase
- Family: Kamon Nandaba (father); Unnamed mother (deceased); Shigekuni Nandaba (grandfather)
- Nationality: Japanese

Naota Nandaba (ナンダバ・ナオ太, Nandaba Naota), is the 12-year-old protagonist of the first season. His name is derived from the Japanese word for "honesty". Unbeknownst to him, he has the "right kind of head" to be used as an N.O. channel, form of dimensional energy that seems to manifest through hormonal influxes.

Slightly wise beyond his years and heavily critical of others around him, Naota is cynical, obsessed with appearing mature and devoutly acts nonchalant. This is most expressed in his monologues which open and close each episode where he continues to claim that "nothing amazing ever happens here - everything is ordinary" despite the show's surreal and often absurd happenings. His attitude is largely reserved and bitter, though he can be somewhat smug and content at times. Naota idolizes his older brother Tasuku, carrying around Tasuku's baseball bat, and even hanging out with Tasuku's old girlfriend Mamimi. In Naota's mind, Tasuku is the epitome of what it means to be an adult, as opposed to the other adults in his life (e.g. his father, his grandfather, and his teacher) who he perceives as being immature. Much like Amarao, Naota is picky about his drinks (disliking drinks which are sour or bitter) and hates spicy foods, and shares an intimate bond with Haruko. This being said, Amarao and Naota's childhoods nearly mirror each other.

While initially bothered by Haruko's presence as she provided him with a Gibson Flying V from his N.O. Channel, Naota begins to develops a crush on her, which overlaps with his initial crush on Mamimi. He embraces her with a kiss in the final episode, and prior to that breaks down and cries while hugging her after she had returned from leaving without notice. Despite this, when his chance to be with her comes, he chooses to let her go and not follow her while keeping her Rickenbacker 4001 after she took the double-necked guitar/bass he created from his Gibson Flying V and Atomsk's Gibson EB-0.

=== Hidomi Hibajiri ===
Hidomi Hibajiri
- FLCL: Progressive character
- First appearance: Re:Start
- Created by: Production I.G
- Voiced by: Japanese: Inori Minase; English: Xanthe Huynh

In-universe information
- Alias: None
- Species: Human
- Gender: Female
- Occupation: None
- Affiliation: Ohzu
- Family: Hinae Hibajiri (mother); Unnamed father Ko Ide (boyfriend)
- Nationality: Japanese

Hidomi Hibajiri (雲雀弄 ヒドミ, Hibajiri Hidomi) is the nihilistic 14-year-old protagonist of season two, FLCL Progressive. While sharing Naota's outlook on Mabase, Hidomi frequently has morbid dreams of herself as a corpse and dying in horrific ways with her more perky subconsciousness as the narrator. She also wears a set of cat ear headphones which Julia Jinyu recognizes to be an inhibition device created by Medical Mechanica that protects her from both her own power and Haruko's mind altering abilities. The headphones' LED lights change from blue to red whenever she is about to "overflow", making her targeted by Haruko as a result. Haruko's attempt to have the headphones removed activates its security lock mode, drilling itself into Hidomi's skull to prevent removal and causing her to manifest the traits of her subconsciousness as a result of radiowaves from an active Medical Mechanica factory. Once the factory is destroyed, gaining glimpses of Haruko's attempt to contain Atomsk and her intent with that power, Hidomi refuses to help as she became a different person to the point that her dreams are no longer morbid in nature. The actions caused by Haruko that result in Ide being a casualty provoke Hidomi into attacking her, with Hidomi eventually reunited with Ide as they begin their relationship in the season epilogue.

=== Kana Koumoto ===
Kana Koumoto
- FLCL: Alternative character
- First appearance: Flying Memory
- Created by: Production I.G; NUT; Revoroot
- Voiced by: Japanese: Karen Miyama; English: Megan Harvey

In-universe information
- Alias: None
- Species: Human
- Gender: Female
- Occupation: None
- Affiliation: Earth; Bureau of Interstellar Immigration
- Family: Shizuka Koumoto (mother); Unnamed father
- Nationality: Japanese

Kana Koumoto (河本 カナ, Kōmoto Kana) is the 17-year-old protagonist of season three, FLCL Alternative. She is a noisy airhead who works part-time at a restaurant and hangs with her friends, Mossan, Hijiri and Pets in what was an unremarkable time until she crossed paths with Haruko who opened her N.O. Channel. But the Kana unintentionally caused their reality to split in two as a result. She returns in season five, FLCL Shoegaze, 10 years after the events of FLCL Alternative, as an Interstellar Immigration Bureau with conflicted issues of her superiors' plan to merge the split realities back together.

=== Shinpachi ===
Shinpachi
- FLCL: Grunge character
- First appearance: Shinpachi
- Created by: Production I.G; MontBlanc Pictures
- Voiced by: Japanese: Junko Minagawa; English: Casey Mongillo

In-universe information
- Alias: None
- Species: Human
- Gender: Male
- Occupation: None
- Affiliation: None
- Family: Unnamed father
- Nationality: Japanese

Shinpachi (シンパチ) is the young protagonist of season four, FLCL Grunge. Working at his father's rundown sushi restaurant in Okura, Shinpachi is a cynical boy who lived a rather dull life until getting caught up in Haruko's schemes when she activated his N.O. abilities and used him to acquire her trademark guitar weapon.

=== Canti ===
Canti (カンチ, Kanchi) is a medical robot with what looks like a television set for a head. He was manufactured by Medical Mechanica, but he is possessed by Atomsk during his escape attempt and ends up traveling to Earth via Naota's N.O. Channel. Haruko's act of breaking the back of the robot's head causes Atomsk to reside within the robot ending up in the service of the Nandaba Family and doing Haruko's work, fetching things like drinks and porno magazines for Shigekuni. In the latter case, a conscientious attempt to satisfy Shigekuni's request, the manga states the robot would spend three hours at a time looking through "perverted magazines" which gave the impression that he likes porn. When Mamimi first saw the robot while he was wearing a halo and wings, believing him to be a god due to his angelic appearance, she named him "Canti" after "Cantido, the Lord of Black Flames" in the video game she plays.

Despite his appearance, Canti expresses human-like emotions as he feels embarrassed about his broken head (where Haruko hit him) and spends his free time finding the pieces to glue back together while wearing a box. He is also extremely polite, extending a helping hand to Lieutenant Kitsurubami even after she attempted to destroy him which thoroughly charms her. Apparently, he can also eat curry with his "mouth" (which is just a grille), but it is never really explained how.

As Canti still contains a fragment of Atomsk, he can be possessed by the being and proceed to "eat" Naota to gradually complete being transferred to Earth. Atomsk's symbol appears on Canti's screen when he absorbs Naota; the symbol is a corruption of the kanji characters for "adult" (大人). This symbol also appears on him when Naota "swings the bat" in "Full Swing". When Naota is absorbed, Canti's physical strength is increased and he gains the ability to transform into an antitank gun, called the "Overdrive Technique" in the manga, that fires Naota's essence in the form of a liquid bullet that returns to the gun after being fired. When first synchronized with Naota, Naota fully connects with Canti through a plug that goes in his eye instead of a screw-in light bulb in the back of his head (broken off in episode one). In the final episode of the first season, his monitor displaying the characters for "child" (小人) instead at the time, Canti is revealed to be a component piece of the Medical Mechanica's Terminal Core and used by both the organization to power their doomsday device and Haruko to complete Atomsk's arrival to Earth.

Remaining with the Nandaba Family, Canti eventually shuts down and ends up in the possession of the Interstellar Immigration Bureau prior to the events of FLCL Progressive in their attempt to reverse-engineer N.O. powered technology. However, the robot is eventually discarded and sent to the organization's space base, his severed head coming back to life as a dog-like creature as the result of Atomsk's arrival to Earth while ingesting Ide's being. Possessed by Atomsk, Canti eventually releases the entity and Ide. Canti becomes a maid at Hidomi's café as revealed in the season epilogue.

While he does not appear in FLCL Alternative, multiple combat robots modeled after Canti were sent by Medical Mechanica after the protagonists in the final episode. In FLCL Grunge, it seems Medical Mechanica employs robots similar to Canti.

=== Commander Amarao ===
Voiced by: Koichi Okura (original series), Takeshi Maeda (Grunge) (Japanese); Dave Mallow (original series), Aaron LaPlante (Grunge) (English)

Commander Amarao (アマラオ) works for the Department of Interstellar Immigration, a middle man for negotiations between the government and Medical Mechanica while seeing Haruko as a legit threat for provoking Medical Mechanica into attacking Earth. Amarao has a history with Haruko as one of the many people she exploited before abandoning him for not living up to her standards as his N.O. portals are small, negating his ability by eating sweets. The events of FLCL Grunge reveal that Amarao lost his eyebrows while sent off world to investigate Okura, encountering Haruko as she eludes him much to his humiliation. He since wears fake eyebrows made of nori that also negate his N.O. channel, which Haruko later mocked as a means of cover up his apparent lack of masculinity. His vehicle of choice is a Fuji Rabbit, a motor scooter which was initially produced in 1946 six months prior to the initial production of the Vespa, hinting traces Haruko's effect on him in his youth.

Amarao first appears in the original series to covertly warn Naota of Haruko and her intentions, giving viewers the impression that he is virtually an omniscient character with his dispensing of background information and fairly accurate predictions. But subsequent events would reveal him to be an extremely weak and very shortsighted man despite seeming to grasp what is happening better than most, having a hint of jealously over Haruko's preference of Naota over him despite knowing her intentions for him and knowing he needs to stop her from endangering Earth with her antics to the point of ordering an attempted assassination of Canti which led to him being confronted by Haruko in all-out gunfight before Medical Mechanica's giant robot appeared. Ultimately, unable to convince Naota, Amarao could only watch the climax unfold before seeing Atomsk fully manifest. In the manga, Amarao's role is greatly diminished but had an important role in visiting Shigekuni and revealed what he knows of the N.O. channel to him.

=== Ko Ide ===
Voiced by: Jun Fukuyama (Japanese); Robbie Daymond (English)

Ko Ide (井出 交, Ide Kō), Hidomi's classmate resembling Naota who became Haruko's ideal pawn in confirming Hidomi as her target, opening his N.O. Channel as the youth bragged to his classmates about her giving him special treatment. Ide eventually realizes he has feelings for Hidomi, using his power to oppose Haruko and later fights her using Naota's Gibson Flying V which he acquired from Julia. Ide ends up being affected by Hidomi's N.O. Channel, turning him into a balloon person that was later ground up by the Interstellar Immigration Bureau's space base and fed to Canti. This resulted in Ide being held within Canti's restored body before being released and restored to his former self.

=== Tsukata Kanda ===
Voiced by: Yutaka Aoyama (Japanese); Ray Chase (English)

Tsukata Kanda (神田 束太, Kanda Tsukata) is a member of the Department of Interstellar Immigration who bears a resemblance to Naota, being one of Haruko's previous targets before she deemed his N.O Channel too small for her plans. While he supports Haruko during the events of FLCL Alternate, he becomes the antagonist of FLCL Shoegaze in being determinated to merge the split realities back together to see Haruko again.

=== Atomsk ===
Atomsk (アトムスク, Atomusuku), also known as the "Pirate King" (海賊王, Kaizoku-Ō) due his N.O. channel enabling him to steal entire star systems, is an enigmatic energy being in the form of a phoenix-like creature with a nose ring identical to the metal Ring on Haruko's bracelet that allows her to detect Atomsk's presence. Atomsk's power to manipulate space and travel dimensions made him sought by both Haruko and Medical Mechanica, the latter having successfully captured him before the events of the first season. Atomsk's bass guitar is a 1961 Gibson EB-0. Amarao assumed that Atomsk was a humanoid male figure with fiery red hair and that he was Haruko's lover by the way she spoke of him, but, in actuality, Haruko's goal was to devour Atomsk and take his power for her own use.

He made a cameo appearance in FLCL Grunge, having hid away under the junkyard near Okura and flying off with Haruko hitching a ride on the Medical Mechanica plant as it pursue him, with the company eventually capturing Atomsk. He also appears in FLCL Shoegaze, communicating with Masaki Oufuji before revealing himself and help Masaki reunite with Narumi.

During the first season, Haruko searched for an ideal human whose N.O. Channel was great enough to enable Atomsk's escape from Medical Mechanica. This led her to Naota, though Atomsk's arrival is incomplete since he is sealed within Canti and possesses the robot to ingest Naota to manifest his power to fight the Medical Mechanica robots sent after him. While Haruko planned Atomsk's full appearance on Earth by allowing Medical Mechanica's doomsday scheme to occur, it ended up with Atomsk using Naota as a host body to fight a furious Haruko using both his guitar and Naota's before combining them for the death blow. But the fight ends abruptly when Naota releases the being while kissing a surprised Haruko after confessing his love for her. Atomsk then leaves Earth while damaging the Medical Mechanica plant, with Haruko chasing after him.

As revealed in the credits of FLCL Progressive, taking place between it and the first season, Atomsk is later found and absorbed by Haruko for the brief moment that resulted in the creation of Julia Jinyu, who attempted to keep him free from Haruko and Medical Mechanica before she was defeated and eaten by the former. While not making a direct appearance, Atomsk appears in one of Hidomi Hibajiri's dreams, alluding a connection between the two. Atomsk eventually returns to Earth to reclaim his guitar as a maddened Hidomi battles Haruko, first possessing Canti and then Julia before flying off.

Atomsk is named after the novel Atomsk by Carmichael Smith (a pseudonym of Paul Myron Anthony Linebarger, better known as Cordwainer Smith). In the director commentary on the third DVD, the director states that he is unsure as to how it is really pronounced (in the English version of FLCL, it is pronounced "atomisk").

=== Medical Mechanica ===
Medical Mechanica (メディカル・メカニカ, Medikaru Mekanika) is a mysterious organization that serves as a secondary antagonist in the FLCL series, being of alien origin like Haruko and seeking Atomsk's power for their own agenda. Having placed a clothes iron-like factory on Mabase, its bottom outfitted with a laser cannon, Medical Mechanica's goal is said to be ironing out the wrinkles in both a figurative sense and as a literally means of terraforming. During the first season, the Interstellar Immigration Bureau having peacefully prevented their actions prior, Medical Mechanica is provoked into attacking Earth by sending its robots to the planet through Naota's N.O. channel as Haruko uses it to gradually steal Atomsk from them. But their attack ends when Naota released Atomsk and the being damaged the factory before leaving. In FLCL Progressive, traces of their presence on Earth are still seen, Medical Mechanica is revealed to have developed the earphones Hidomi wears as Haruko's actions once more cause conflict between it and the Interstellar Immigration Bureau.

== Original FLCL characters ==
=== Mamimi Samejima ===
Voiced by: Izumi Kasagi (Japanese); Stephanie Sheh (English)

Mamimi Samejima (サメジマ・マミ美, Samejima Mamimi) is a 17-year-old truant high school student with a quixotical grip on reality who carries a camera and smokes most of the time, hinted to have been bullied at her school and apparently from a broken family as her parents are mentioned as separated or are out of her life. She was originally Tasuku's girlfriend since he saved her from an elementary school fire, which she apparently caused due to her pyromaniacal tendencies to burn things she hates like her old school. It became a ritualistic practice for her in worshipping her personal deity Cantido whom she considered Canti an incarnation of. While Mamimi conceals her destructive nature, her aura of benign morbidness does make her an outcast in the eyes of others, save Naota who had a crush on her. Most characters refer to Mamimi simply as Mamimi, but Naota's friends refer to her as "Naota's wife", and Haruko calls her "Sameji", a shortening of her last name. Amarao refers to her as "that high school girl".

Her relationship with Tasuku was ultimately based on caring for those who are dependent on her, having a habit of naming things "Takkun" like a black kitten, and leaving them the moment that they show any independence. Mamimi entered a sort of relationship with Naota as a means of coping with Tasuku having left for America and getting a new girlfriend, calling him "Takkun" before he realized she was using him and emotionally explodes about her using him as a consolation prize during the events of Brittle Bullet while vowing to win her love. But a disillusioned Mamimi instead found a Medical Mechanica terminal core which she named "Takkun", used it to enact retribution against those who have wronged her by feeding it her classmates' cellular phones and motorbikes before it goes berserk while enacting its program. It is revealed that Mamimi, unable to return Naota's feelings despite having a genuine affection for him, leaves Mabase to become a professional photographer, assuming they remain friends.

=== Lieutenant Kitsurubami ===
Voiced by: Chiemi Chiba (Japanese); L.Villa (English)

Lieutenant Kitsurubami (キツルバミ) is an attractive young woman and Amarao's second in command in the Interstellar Immigration Bureau, often seen either giving out vital mission data or on the field. Despite Amarao's flirting advances, respecting her superior despite being weirded out by his false eyebrows, Kitsurubami prefers to keep their relationship strictly professional. She also seems to become smitten with Canti, despite her initial attempt of destroying him with an anti-tank rifle while incorrectly calling him a "cyborg". Kitsurubami is also shown to suffer chronic nose bleeds whenever witnessing Naota's N.O. manifestations from his head, though these scenes might be played for comedic effect.

Kitsurubami is named after a light brown traditional Japanese color, which happens to be the color of her skin. Thus, her name could be interpreted as "Lieutenant Brown", although the color Kitsurubami is not the common "brown". She appears to be the only "normal" (or mature) adult in FLCL; however, her apparent dislike of close contact with others adds an element of childishness to her character.

=== Junko Miyaji ===
Voiced by: Yukari Fukui (Japanese); Jessica Straus (English)

Junko Miyaji (ミヤジ・ジュン子, Miyaji Junko) is Naota's eccentric sixth grade teacher. Her students have given her the nickname "Miya-Jun". She seems to be constantly troubled by the shallower problems which Naota seems to create, such as the destruction of her car (which happens twice over the course of the series) or the terrible interruption of a lesson. Even on 'normal' days, however, she is pathetically inept: her attempt to teach chopstick usage to a generation of students raised on sporks ends with the revelation that she is unable to use them herself.

She can be viewed as symbolic of the ineffectiveness of educational institutions imparting any truly important or useful knowledge: Naota constantly characterizes the adults around him as "unable to grow-up". In his mind, Miya-Jun's inability to act like a normal adult (similar to his father, grandfather, Ninamori's father, Amarao, and many others) confirms his theory. Adults like her are contradictions in Naota's life; he wants to become an adult, but the adults around him do not act like adults at all.

=== Kamon Nandaba ===
Voiced by: Suzuki Matsuo (Japanese); Joe Martin (English)

Kamon Nandaba (ナンダバ・カモン, Nandaba Kamon), 47, is Naota's father, a former pop culture journalist working as a freelance writer, with his own trashy tabloid: "Kamon-Mabase" (the title is a pun on "Come on, Mabase"). Compared to the other adults in FLCL, Kamon is the most extremely immature yet shows a surprising amount of seriousness and thoughtfulness. He also makes the most references to pop culture: EVA, "Monkey-sensei" (referring to the creator of the series Lupin III), Hamtaro, Mobile Suit Gundam, and MTV to name a few.

Kamon has taken a liking to Haruko when she moved in as their family's housekeeper, but she only wants to use him as a potential N.O. portal before deeming him useless to her needs and places him in a deathlike coma while replacing him with a robot double to putter around the house. Naota, believing his father and Haruko are sleeping together, eventually learns the truth when he indirectly deactivated the robot and found the real Kamon whom he revived by being hydrated in their bathtub. Despite this ordeal, Kamon continued to obsess over Haruko to the point of challenging Naota to an airsoft gunfight which he lost.

In the manga, the Kamon's robot double is absent and Naota ends up murdering Kamon over the misunderstanding.

=== Shigekuni Nandaba ===
Voiced by: Hiroshi Ito (Japanese); Steve Kramer (English)

Shigekuni Nandaba (ナンダバ・シゲクニ, Nandaba Shigekuni) is Naota's grandfather and Kamon's father. He owns the family bakery and coaches the local baseball team, the Mabase Martians. He has a grudge against Mamimi for unspecified reasons, but it is suggested that he did not approve of Tasuku dating her. Shigekuni values baseball more than anything in the world—he is disappointed in his own son and younger grandson because they are lousy baseball players. He does not defend Naota as the other players mock him, because he holds too much pride for Tasuku. He enjoys taking advantage of Canti as much as Kamon does. He has an affinity for pornography. In the first episode, he mistakes "furi kuri" with "kuri kuri," a sound effect often used to describe any twisting motion, often breasts or nipples.

=== Tasuku Nandaba ===
Tasuku Nandaba (ナンダバ・タスク, Nandaba Tasuku), who is 17 years old at the beginning of the series (current age unknown), is Naota's older brother who moved to America to play baseball. Mamimi believes that, since Tasuku saved her from the fire at their old elementary school, he likes her and it is continually suggested that Naota serves as a sort of stand-in for his older brother (most explicitly by Mamimi's use of the same nickname for both). The actual depth of their initial relationship is unknown. In "FLCLimax", she seems to have lost hope in him, allowing the destruction of her mobile phone just seconds after looking at his number on a screen. In the first episode, Naota receives a postcard from Tasuku, revealing that he now has an American girlfriend.

Although he never actually appears on screen, he is very significant to the storyline. As the former star of the baseball team, Naota idolizes him, but is afraid of not living up to his brother's legacy, and because of this never swings the bat when at the plate.

There are examples of scenes in which Naota yells out "Tasuk--"; the Japanese audience, at first assuming that he will exclaim, "Tasukete" (Help me!), may be surprised when he instead says, "Tasuku", the name of his older brother. Naota says in the first episode that, for a moment, Haruko resembled Tasuku.

=== Eri Ninamori ===
Voiced by: Mika Itō (Japanese); Heather Lee Joelson (English)

Eri Ninamori (ニナモリ・エリ, Ninamori Eri), 12, is Naota's classmate. In the series, she is referred to by her last name. She is the daughter of the mayor of Mabase and is class president. She projects herself as a proper and slightly stuck-up cynic with good grades while concealing personal information to an almost obsessive degree; like needing corrective lenses, instead wearing contacts while at school. Even with her class president status, however, Ninamori is not above breaking the rules to get what she wants. When news of her father's affair with his secretary is made public with the possibility of her parents getting a divorce, Ninamori rigged the classroom ballots to get the lead role in a Puss in Boots play while having Naota cast as the titular character to his dismay. She is ultimately revealed to have a slight crush on Naota, further hinted by her dislike towards Mamimi and later Haruko.

Ninamori has N.O. powers as well, though a temporary effect of Naota head-butting her as a result of Haruko's antics sending him flying towards her. In this instance, a cephalopod-like Medical Mechanica robot which first appeared on Naota's head as cat ears transferred itself over to Ninamori at the time it begins to gradually manifest while using her body as a both a weapon and shield in its attempt to capture Canti before it finally emerged after ingesting curry and is destroyed. In the manga, the robot's role is lessened as more of a minor support character in helping Ninamori save Naota from an angered Haruko.

=== Gaku Manabe ===
Voiced by: Akira Miyajima (Japanese); Bob Marx (English)

Gaku Manabe (マナベ・ガク, Manabe Gaku), age 12, is another one of Naota's classmates and close friends and is obsessed with kissing and other things of sexual behaviour. In episode three, "Marquis de Carabas", he plays the part of a mouse in the school play. Gaku also uses the word "chu" constantly, especially when referring to Haruko. This is a pun in Japanese, because "chu" is the Japanese onomatopoeia for both kissing and the sound a mouse makes. In the English version, "chu" is replaced with "smooch" to make more sense to English speaking audiences. He is somewhat hyper (compared to the bored composure of his friends) and is usually seen with Masashi. He is an encyclopedia of bizarre rumors and legends, many of which are sexual in nature. He consistently refers to Mamimi as Naota's "wife", and Haruko as the "kiss-kiss" girl, likely due to her lewd behavior around Naota.

=== Masashi Masamune ===
Voiced by: Kazuhito Suzuki (Japanese); Steven Jay Blum (English)

Masashi Masamune (マサムネ・マサシ, Masamune Masashi), age 13, is yet another of Naota's classmates. He is friends with Naota and is often seen hanging out with him, Gaku, and Ninamori. Masashi also has a job as a delivery boy, and drives a truck around, even though he is only in grade school. His father's truck is later eaten by the terminal core when Mamimi loses control of it. Masashi, like Naota, generally sounds slightly depressed.

== FLCL Progressive characters ==
=== Julia Jinyu ===
Voiced by: Miyuki Sawashiro (Japanese); Allegra Clark (English)

Julia Jinyu (ジュリア・ジンユ), revealed to be created from Haruko during her attempt to contain the absorbed Atomsk, Julia becomes an opposition to her counterpart's scheme to recapture Atomsk through Hidomi. While originally a part of Haruko, possessing a Fender Jazzmaster that was initially Naota's Gibson Flying V before it fused with Atomsk's guitar, Julia has a more serious and blunt personality and travels in a vintage Chevrolet Bel Air that can transform into a robot with multiple functions. Finding Hidomi before Haruko, Julia arranges herself to work at the Hibajiri Café after making an attempted vehicular homicide on the girl and resolving to be her bodyguard instead. Though Julia is her own person, preferring to ensure Atomsk's freedom at all costs, Julia retained traits with Haruko that include loving Atomsk and bearing animosity towards Medical Mechanica. Julia is ultimately defeated by Haruko, who gave the offshoot closure of truly becoming her own person before eating her. But when Haruko absorbed Atomsk, Julia manages to separate from her and briefly serve as Atomsk's vessel before leaving for parts unknown.

=== Hinae Hibajiri ===
Voiced by: Kikuko Inoue (Japanese); Julie Ann Taylor (English)

Hinae Hibajiri (雲雀弄 ヒナエ, Hibajiri Hinae), Hidomi's mother, she runs a local cafe which Hidomi and later Jinyu work at. Hinae's reasons for running a café were to await the return of her husband, only to ultimately decide to close the establishment much to Hidomi's dismay. But after realizing Hidomi's feelings, Hinae reconsiders and decides to keep the business open even after their café was destroyed during Medical Mechanica's attack.

=== Goro Mori ===
Voiced by: Tomo Muranaka (Japanese); Jon Allen (English)

Goro Mori (森 吾郎, Mori Gorō), Ko's pudgy classmate, known for wearing unusual clothing including a short skirt to class without any guilt. He also lied to his classmates about having a girlfriend, having hired Aiko during a day at the beach to keep face before Marco spotted him paying Aiko for helping him. Despite Aiko's initial disinterest in him outside their business relationship, Goro ends up winning her heart while helping her.

=== Marco Nogata ===
Voiced by: Masatomo Nakazawa (Japanese); Yuri Lowenthal (English)

Marco Nogata (マルコ 野方) is a classmate of Hidomi's who is of Latino descent and Goro's friend, appearing to passively absorb the oddities of his class while becoming a part-time worker and test subject at the Interstellar Immigration Bureau's amusement park front.

=== Eye Patch ===
Voiced by: Takayuki Sugo (Japanese); J. David Brimmer (English)

Eye Patch (アイパッチ) is a homeless guy whose real name is unknown and is a member of the Interstellar Immigration Bureau, appearing in numerous places like as a regular at the Hibajiri café. As a member of the Interstellar Immigration Bureau, Eye Patch is revealed to have acquired the lifeless Canti from the Nandaba Family to develop technology that utilizes the N.O. Channel's energies. Such an item being a flower pot that can reverse a N.O. Channel's polarity.

=== Masurao ===
Voiced by: Kouji Ohkura (Japanese); Jason Griffith (English)

Masurao (マスラオ) is Commander Amarao's son who serves as Eye Patch's aide, keeping his activities in the Interstellar Immigration Bureau a secret from Aiko by pretending to be a boxer.

=== Aiko ===
Voiced by: Tomoyo Kurosawa (Japanese); Christine Marie Cabanos (English)

Aiko (アイコ) is Masurao's daughter who runs a scheme involving posing as a girlfriend for desperate boys in exchange for money while giving away her father's possessions, ultimately revealed to be an artificial plant-human created by the Interstellar Immigration Bureau from reverse-engineering Canti and that she is amassing the money to buy her freedom. She eventually uses her power to stop Medical Mechanica's assault on Mabase while developing genuine feelings for Goro.

=== Tonkichi ===
Voiced by: Jin Urayama (Japanese); Steve Kramer (English)

Tonkichi (屯吉) is an elderly member of the Interstellar Immigration Bureau who works under the cover of an amusement park worker in a Mr. Dodo costume, hiring Marco Nogata to test a new attraction which is later revealed to be part of an anti-Medical Mechanica weapon. The amusement park itself would later be revealed as the site of an experiment to extract N.O. energies from love-sick people, Tonkicki attempting to take down a still active Medical Mechanica factory.

=== Tami Hanae ===
Voiced by: Reiko Suzuki (Japanese); Barbara Goodson (English)

Tami Hanae (花枝 タミ, Hanae Tami) is a member of the Interstellar Immigration Bureau who maintains the lost-and-found storage's facilities and found objects.

== FLCL Alternative characters ==
=== Tomomi Hetada ===
Voiced by: Yu-ri Yoshida (Japanese); Marieve Herington (English)

Tomomi Hetada (辺田 友美, Hetada Tomomi) is one of Kana's friends (until episode 5) whose nickname is "Pets" (ペッツ, Petsu), a high school student with issues with her dad. In episode 5, with her family leaving for Mars, Pets ends her friendship with Kana while admitting that she always hated her. As revealed in FLCL Shoegaze, Pets ended up in the same dimension as Haruko.

=== Hijiri Yajima ===
Voiced by: Riho Iida (Japanese); Erica Lindbeck (English)

Hijiri Yajima (矢島 聖（ヒジリー）, Yajima Hijiri) is one of Kana's friends, a high school student who is also a model.

=== Man Motoyama ===
Voiced by: Mutsumi Tamura (Japanese); Marin Miller (English)

Man Motoyama (本山 満, Motoyama Man) is one of Kana's friends who goes by the nickname "Mossan"（モッさん, a high school student with aspirations to be a clothing designer/model.

=== Dennis Yoga ===
Voiced by: Katsuji Mori (Japanese); Steven Jay Blum (English)

Dennis Yoga (デニス 用賀) is an owner and head chef of the ramen restaurant Kana works at.

=== Maki Kitaki ===
Voiced by: Kaya Matsutani (Japanese); Erica Schroeder (English)

Maki Kitaki (木滝 真希, Kitaki Maki) is the Prime Minister of Japan.

== FLCL Grunge characters ==
=== Shonari ===
Shonari
- FLCL: Grunge character
- First appearance: Shonari
- Created by: Production I.G; MontBlanc Pictures
- Voiced by: Japanese: Seiyu Fujiwara; English: Luis Bermudez

In-universe information
- Alias: None
- Species: Alien (Rockien)
- Gender: Male
- Occupation: None
- Affiliation: None
- Family: Unnamed father Unnamed mother
- Nationality: Japanese

Shonari is a Rockinoid who came to Earth as a child alongside his older brother Dainari, who became a top member of the Keshibishi. Despite the prejudice he suffered for being an alien, trying to stay out of trouble, he befriended Shin and Orinoko with a crush on the latter. When Dainari died during the mob war Haruko caused, he is manipulated by her to kill Kuroiwa before realizing the truth.

=== Orinoko ===
Orinoko
- FLCL: Grunge character
- First appearance: Orinoko
- Created by: Production I.G; MontBlanc Pictures
- Voiced by: Japanese: Yuna Kitahara; English: Michelle Marie

In-universe information
- Alias: None
- Species: Human
- Gender: Female
- Occupation: None
- Affiliation: None
- Family: Unnamed father Saya (mother)
- Nationality: Japanese

A quiet young girl who is friends with Shin and Shonari, helping her father finding iron in the land around Okura to make swords.

=== Mayor Kuroiwa ===
Voiced by: Hiroshi Shimozaki (Japanese); Dino Andrade (English)

Okura's corrupt and perverted mayor of small stature who has one of the local Yakuza and the police in his pocket, having dealings with Medical Mechanica, considering himself above the common people. But Haruko weasels into Kuroiwa's life to infect one of Medical Mechanica's robots with a virus to infect the company, stealing all the mayor's tickets for the last shuttle off Earth while arranging him to be murdered by Shonari.

=== Dainari ===
Voiced by: Taichi Takeda (Japanese); Marc Thompson (English)

Dainari is a perpetually drunk Rockinoid and Shonari's older brother who works as an enforcer and cleaner in the Keshibishi Group.

== FLCL Shoegaze characters ==
=== Masaki Oufuji ===
Masaki Oufuji
- FLCL: Shoegaze character
- First appearance: Full Barricade
- Created by: Production I.G; Studio NUT
- Voiced by: Japanese: Shōya Chiba; English: Jesse Nowack

In-universe information
- Alias: None
- Species: Human
- Gender: Male
- Occupation: None
- Affiliation: None
- Family: Unnamed mother
- Nationality: Japanese

A youth ostracized for seeing strange phantoms and revealed to have a NO Channel which Atomsk communicates to him through.

=== Harumi Araishu ===
Harumi Araishu
- FLCL: Shoegaze character
- First appearance: Full Barricade
- Created by: Production I.G; Studio NUT
- Voiced by: Japanese: Satomi Amano; English: Kim Gasicie

In-universe information
- Alias: None
- Species: Human
- Gender: Female
- Occupation: None
- Affiliation: None
- Family: Unnamed father Unnamed mother
- Nationality: Japanese

A mysterious girl with antics similar to Haruko who befriended Masaki. Eventually, Harumi is revealed to be the displaced soul of a boy on Mars who ended up in a girl's body.

== See also ==
- List of FLCL episodes
- Discography of FLCL
