= That Happy Feeling =

1962 single by Bert Kaempfert

"That Happy Feeling" is a popular music tune composed by Ghanaian musician Guy Warren in 1956 and released in 1957 with the original title "An African's Prayer (Eyi Wala Dong)" and African lyrics. It was later revised and recorded as an instrumental-only, orchestral single by Bert Kaempfert, and released in 1962 with the title That Happy Feeling.

== Background ==
The track was recorded on March 16, 1962, and featured as the second cut on Kaempfert's album A Swingin' Safari. That song and the title track were among the first pop instrumentals to incorporate elements of South African music. It is also the title track of what is virtually the same album as the German A Swingin' Safari, issued with a different name in America.

== Chart performance ==
Kaempfert's recording of the tune peaked at number 67 on the Billboard Hot 100 chart.

== Popular culture ==
The tune also proved to be a natural choice for locally produced children's television programming, especially in the United States:

- In New York City, Sandy Becker used it as the theme for his local morning program on WNEW.
- In Southern California, the music was used between children's programs during the early days of KBSC Corona/Los Angeles. It was played with the title card of the station's logo and not always to its conclusion, presumably because a master control technician was busy cueing the tape of whatever show was scheduled to be broadcast. The instrumental was used for station sign on and sign off at TV stations once owned by the former Kaiser Broadcasting System, including WKBS-TV (Philadelphia) Channel 48 in Burlington, New Jersey, and Philadelphia, Pennsylvania and WKBF-TV Channel 61 in Cleveland, Ohio. Both stations are now defunct.
- The tune was also used by another Los Angeles television station, KABC-TV Channel 7, when the station would sign on in the early morning to begin its broadcast day well before round-the-clock broadcasting became the norm much later.
- It is used in Adam Elliot's 2009 film, Mary and Max.
- It is also used by the UK's Cambridge Talking News as its signature tune on its weekly recordings for the blind and partially sighted.
- A version sung by Herb Oscar Anderson was used on WABC Radio 770.
