= Marquis de Carabas =

Marquis of Carabas or Marquis de Carabas may refer to:

== Fiction ==
- The Marquis of Carabas (also known as Master-At-Arms), a 1940 novel by Rafael Sabatini
- The Marquis of Carabas' Picture Book, an old collection of children's stories, including Puss in Boots, illustrated by Walter Crane
- "Marquis de Carabas" (FLCL), the third episode of the anime FLCL

=== Characters ===
- A fictional nobleman in the fairy tale Puss in Boots
- A character in the BBC TV series Neverwhere and its novelisation, both written by Neil Gaiman
- A character in the webcomic No Rest for the Wicked
- The Marquess of Carabas, a character in Benjamin Disraeli's novel Vivian Grey

== See also ==
- The Marquis of Carumbas, a fictional character in The Incredible Adventures of Jack Flanders
