= Darcey Wilson =

Australian actress (born 2001)

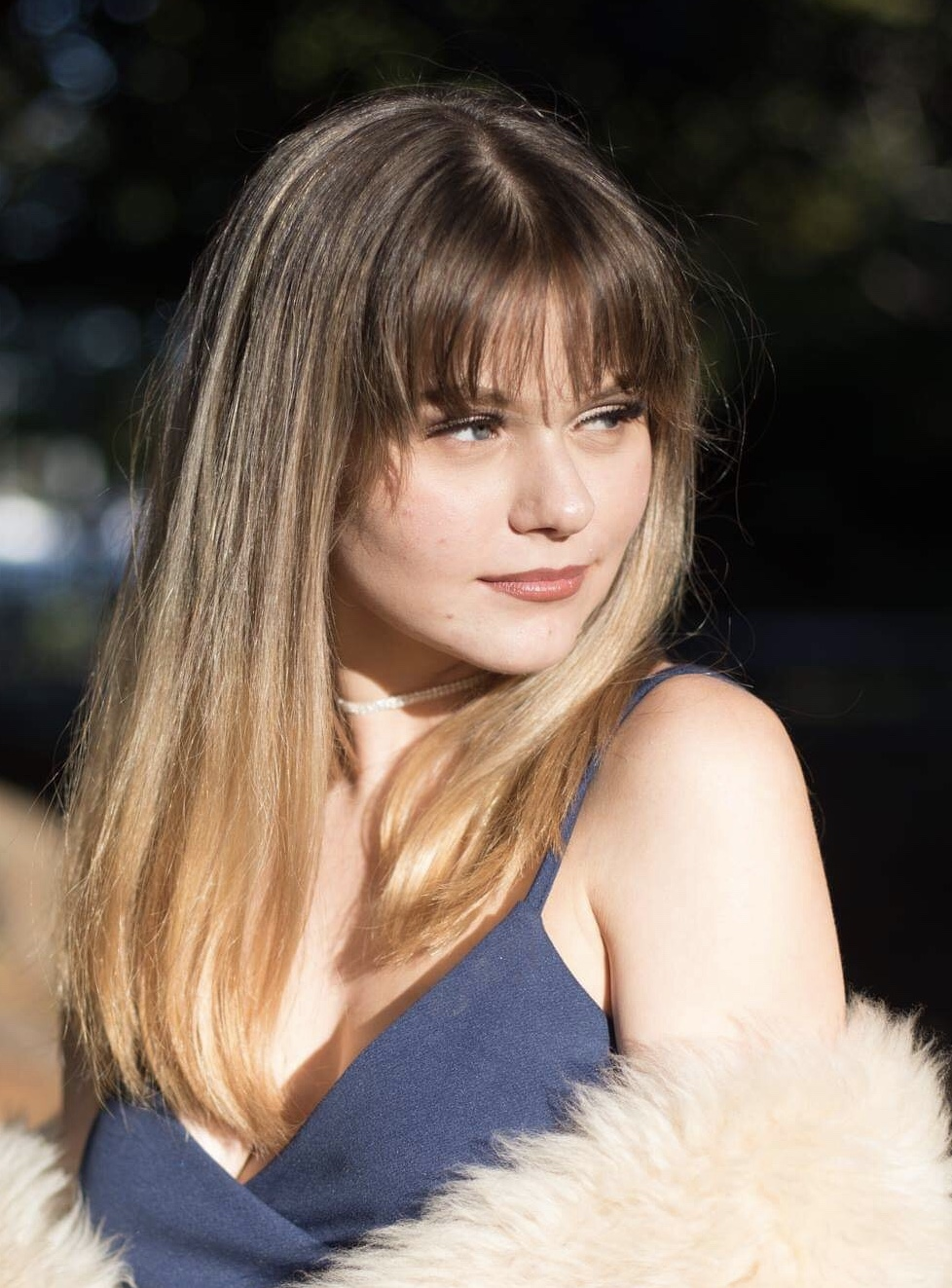
- Born: Darcey Elizabeth Lemon Wilson; 5 February 2001 (age 25); Sydney, New South Wales, Australia
- Occupation: Actress
- Years active: 2013–present
- Parent(s): Genevieve Lemon, Colin Wilson

Darcey Elizabeth Lemon Wilson (born 5 February 2001) is an Australian actress who has been in Australian movies, television, and short films.

== Career ==
Wilson's main roles include Eloise Page in Home and Away (in 2014 and from 2016 to 2017), and Melly in the 2018 film Swinging Safari (also known as Flammable Children), with Kylie Minogue and Guy Pearce.

She also played younger version of Kate Winslet's character in the 2015 film The Dressmaker. The same year, Wilson appeared as a young Gina Rinehart in the miniseries House of Hancock, alongside Sam Neill. In 2017 she starred as Jackie in the miniseries reimagining of the 1971 Ozploitation film Wake in Fright.

== Personal life ==
Wilson is the daughter of actress Genevieve Lemon.

== Filmography ==
=== Film ===
| Title | Year | Role | Notes |
|---|---|---|---|
| 2015 | The Dressmaker | Young Myrtle | Feature film |
| 2015 | Over the Hills and Far Away | Lily | Short film |
| 2015 | Dream Baby | Elvis | Short film |
| 2017 | Swinging Safari (aka Flammable Children) | Melly | Feature film |
| 2017 | Bring Me Back, Ma | Erin | Short film |
| 2017 | Neurogenesis | XV-31 | |

=== Television ===
| Title | Year | Role | Notes |
|---|---|---|---|
| 2014, 2016–2017 | Home and Away | Eloise "Elly" Page | Seasons 27 & 29–30, 32 episodes |
| 2015 | The House of Hancock | Young Gina | Miniseries |
| 2017 | Wake in Fright (miniseries) | Jackie | Miniseries |
