= FLCL season 1 =

FLCL
- Season 1
- Funimation's cover for the Blu-ray release of FLCL
- No. of episodes: 6

Release
- Original network: Adult Swim (U.S.) (Note: The 2003 English dub broadcast in the United States. FLCL was originally released as an OVA series in Japan.)
- Original release: April 26, 2000 (Note: Original OVA release in Japan.) – March 16, 2001

Season chronology
- Next → Season 2: Progressive

Retroactively known as the first season of the FLCL series, all episodes of the 2000 Japanese original video animation series were directed by Kazuya Tsurumaki and produced by the FLCL Production Committee, which included Gainax, Production I.G, and Starchild Records. The English adaptation was licensed by Synch-Point, which released the DVDs and soundtrack. After Synch-Point went out of business, Funimation licensed and re-released the series on Blu-ray and DVD. The story follows Haruko Haruhara, a sociopathic alien drawn to the fictional Japanese suburb of Mabase by the Medical Meccanica building while weaseling in the lives of twelve-year-old Naota Nandaba in the first season and fourteen-year-old Hidomi Hibajiri in the second season as pawns in her agenda to acquire the being called Atomsk.

The first-season episodes aired in North America on Cartoon Network's Adult Swim programming block from August 4 to August 13, 2003.

Six pieces of theme music are used for the episodes; five opening themes and one closing theme. All the theme songs are by Japanese rock band the Pillows. The opening themes are: "One Life", used in episode one, "Instant Music" in episode two and three, "Happy Bivouac" for episode four, "Runners High", utilized in episode five, and "Carnival" in episode six. The closing theme is "Ride on Shooting Star", used for all episodes. Geneon Entertainment has released three original soundtracks encompassing the aforementioned songs, with soundtracks titled Addict, released on January 20, 2004, King of Pirates, released on September 7, 2004, and FLCL No. 3, released on June 7, 2005.

Six DVD compilations, each containing one episode, were released in Japan by Gainax. In addition, a DVD collection box, containing all six DVD compilations, was released in Japan on August 13, 2005. Three compilations were released by Synch-Point in North America. A DVD collection, containing all six was released on January 23, 2007. The series was re-picked up for distribution by Funimation in 2010 and released again on DVD and on Blu-ray in February 2011.

== Episodes ==
No. overall	No. in season	Title	Directed by (Note: Information is taken from the ending credits of each episode.)	Written by	Storyboarded by	Japanese release date	English air date
1	1	"Fooly Cooly"; Transliteration: "Furi Kuri" (Japanese: フリクリ)	Masahiko Ōtsuka	Yōji Enokido	Kazuya Tsurumaki, Hiroyuki Imaishi, Yoh Yoshinari	April 26, 2000	August 5, 2003
Naota Nandaba is a twelve-year-old boy in the city of Mabase, which he describes as being "ordinary" and that "nothing ever happens there." But while hanging out with a high school student named Mamimi Samejima, the girlfriend of his older brother, Naota was using a vending machine when he was run over by a pink-haired woman's Vespa scooter. The pink-haired woman, panicking over killing Naota, proceeds to revive him with CPR and then hits him on the head with a bass guitar. The blow leaves a really large horn-like bump which Naota covers with a bandage, learning of the "Vespa Woman" from rumors told by classmates before being stalked by her to the point of her posing as a nurse when he attempts to get his bump examined at the hospital. It was only when Naota got home that, played out in manga-like scenario, he learns that pink-haired woman, Haruko Haruhara, is now working in his house as a live-in maid. His father asks him if he was "fooly coolying" with Mamimi and then Haruko after learning of the CPR. After discovering Haruko settling in his room, talking to the cat, Naota argues with his stalker over where she will sleep, demanding she should stay with his father. He goes downstairs, where his father says that Mamimi came by to get the day-old bread from their bakery and asks if Mamimi's family is poor. When Naota goes to find her, she tells him how much she likes his brother, who lives in America due to being a great baseball athlete. Naota tells her he has an American girlfriend. Mamimi suddenly says she's overflowing before she collapses. Naota tries to help her when a red TV-headed robot and the severed hand of a giant robot emerge from the bump on head and begin fighting, only to have the battle end with Haruko hitting the TV-headed robot with her guitar after the robot hand is destroyed. Having lost its redness and taken head damage, the robot begins living in the Nandaba residence.
2	2	"Fire Starter"; Transliteration: "Faisuta" (Japanese: ファイスタ)	Ken Andō	Yōji Enokido	Masayuki	June 21, 2000	August 6, 2003
X-rays taken by the TV-Headed robot reveal that Naota's head is empty, due to an N.O. Portal that cannot be easily detected on the X-rays. Haruko reveals the robot to be from Medical Mechanica, who own the iron-shaped factory in Mabase, while introducing herself as a First Class Space Patrol Officer. Haruko later attempts to break into the Medical Mechanica plant, only to return that there is no conventional way in to the assigned security guards as Naota retrieves her. Meanwhile, allowed to act on his own in retrieving his fragments of his head when not doing errands for the Nandabas, the TV-headed robot is seen by Mamimi who thinks he is a god due to the black wings and halo he is wearing and names him "Canti" after a character in a hand-held video game called Fire Starter where the player commits arson to please the game's deity. This goes hand-in-hand with a series of fires erupting around the city, Naota visiting the remains of a burnt elementary school with his friends while learning that Mamimi is being bullied at her school. Naota eventually realizes Mamimi is the arsonist and that she caused the school fire where she had met his brother. Naota soon finds Mamimi performing a 'fire ritual' by the water bank, the girl revealing she hated her old school and fell in love with Naota's brother when he saved her. Mamimi is revealed to have been acting out her video game then attempts to kiss Canti for his blessing, but the rest of the robot Canti battled when he first arrived emerges from Naota's head and proceeds to attack him and Haruko. In the heat of the moment, Canti eats Naota and assumes his reddened state while transforming into a large weapon to damage the robot enough for Haruko to destroy. At the end of the episode Naota wonders what he can do for Mamimi, and promises to always be by her side.
3	3	"Marquis de Carabas"; Transliteration: "Maru Raba" (Japanese: マルラバ)	Shouji Saeki	Yōji Enokido	Shouji Saeki	August 23, 2000	August 7, 2003
The father of Naota's classmate Eri Ninamori, as well as the mayor of Mabase, is caught up in a scandal involving an alleged separation with her mother. Ninamori is more focused on the class' upcoming play, Puss in Boots. She plays the lead opposite Naota, who was voted to play the cat. Naota is unenthusiastic about his role and skips rehearsal. Upon meeting Mamimi, she discovers that he now has cat ears growing from his head. Ninamori retreats to a train station to get away from the media circus that has developed outside her home when her father the mayor was caught in a relationship with his secretary. When Naota finds Ninamori, Haruko comes racing down the street, and loses her Vespa when she tries to avoid hitting a cat. The Vespa slams into Naota and sending him flying into Ninamori, causing them to hit heads while exposing his N.O. manifestation. Curious, she touches them, and passes out due to exposure to N.O. Kamon invites her to spend the night at the Nandaba residence due to the current turmoil at her home. She reveals that she rigged the class votes to have him cast as the cat. The next day, the two get into an argument over the play with Ninamori wanting everything to be perfect for her parents to see. After Ninamori angrily reveals Naota's cat ears, he retaliates by revealing her vote rigging. This triggers the partial emergence of Medical Mechanica robot from her head, a result of his head hitting Naota's from the robot transferred to her N.O. channel, using her body to attack before Haruko forced it to let go by accidentally feeding it curry before Canti destroys it. The class goes through with the play, Ninamori's parents appearing to not go through with their divorce.
4	4	"Full Swing"; Transliteration: "Furi Kiri" (Japanese: フリキリ)	Masahiko Ōtsuka	Yōji Enokido	Nobutoshi Ogura	October 25, 2000	August 8, 2003
Haruko proves to be a star baseball player with phenomenal hitting and pitching skills, nearly singlehandedly defeating the Mabase Martians, who are coached by Naota's grandfather Shigekuni. Naota, however, refuses to swing when he is at bat (it is implied that he does not want to be compared to his brother, who is a professional baseball player) and gets hit by one of Haruko's pitches. At home, Kamon and Haruko indulge in odd behavior that inflames Naota's jealousy. He meets a red-haired man who warns him to stay away from Haruko, later revealed to be Commander Amarao of the Interstellar Immigration Department. Returning to his base, he and his subordinate Lieutenant Kitsurubami learn that one of their satellites has been damaged by one of Haruko's hit baseballs and is descending towards Mabase as part of its programming. Naota confronts Kamon and hits him in the head with a baseball bat, only to discover from Amarao that it was a robot duplicate. Naota finds his real father in a death-like state and revives him with hot water, learning that Haruko disposed of Kamon after deeming him useless for her ends after he could not produce a N.O. Channel. After receiving a message that Amarao asked Naota to give her, Haruko takes Naota to the top of the Medical Mechanica plant and extracts a Gibson Flying V guitar from Naota's head to serve as his "bat". She then leaves as the falling satellite heads straight for Naota, which unfolds into the shape of a baseball glove while launching a baseball-shaped bomb. Naota swings his "bat" and manages to halt the bomb, which begins to detonate. Haruko returns to rescue him by swinging her guitar and knocking it back into space.
5	5	"Brittle Bullet"; Transliteration: "Burabure" (Japanese: ブラブレ)	Shouji Saeki	Yōji Enokido	Hiroyuki Imaishi	December 21, 2000	August 12, 2003
Taking offense at Haruko giving Naota her undivided attention, a jealous Kamon challenges his son to a "duel" for Haruko: Amounting to an insanely intense airsoft firefight with Canti supporting Kamon. During the fight, Kitsurubami tries unsuccessfully to destroy Canti on Amarao's orders, with her and Kamon ending up being carried off in the river current. Mamimi, observing Naota's intimate relationship with Haruko, questions how much he really likes her, leading him to confront her about their relationship. At the same time, revealed to have a history and seeing her as threat to Earth, Commander Amarao ends up in a gunfight against Haruko over the attempt on Canti with Haruko taking out his subordinates and overpowering him after he mentions Atomsk. Haruko was about to kill Amarao when a giant Medical Mechanica robot emerges from Naota and makes its way to the Medical Mechanica plant to activate it, opening Amarao's N.O. Channel to arm herself with a guitar slingshot as she goes after the robot. Trapped on top of the robot and getting upset that Mamimi is calling his brother for help, Naota lets himself be eaten by Canti to fight the robot. But the robot proves too powerful for Canti, losing Naota during a failed attack, and Haruko to destroy until the former produces Atomsk's EB-0 1961 Gibson bass guitar, ripping out the robot's core as it crashes over to the Medical Mechanica plant in the form of a giant hand presiding over it.
6	6	"FLCLimax"; Transliteration: "Furi Kura (Note: The Japanese title is actually an alteration made by Haruko on the phrase "funi funi, funi kura" (フニフニ. フニクラ). The episode's title is not meant to have any actual significance.)" (Japanese: フリクラ)	Masahiko Ōtsuka	Yōji Enokido	Kazuya Tsurumaki, Tadashi Hiramatsu, Hiroyuki Imaishi	March 16, 2001	August 13, 2003
Weeks past since Haruko and Canti have disappeared from Mabase as the town is endlessly shrouded in the smoke pouring out of the Medical Mechanica plant. While advised by Amarao to forget about Haruko and resume his normal life, Naota finds Haruko returned to the Nandaba residence (repeating episode 1's manga dinner scene), causing Naota to later ask her in tears why she left. It was then that Haruko reveals that Atomsk is someone that Medical Mechanica took from her and she needs Naota's help to get him back. At the same time, Amarao seeing the recovery of the giant hand's "terminal core" to be vital, Mamimi finds the dog-like core and starts feeding it cellphones and vehicles before it goes berserk and assimilates Canti while reaching the Medical Mechanica plant. Despite Amarao trying to convince Naota that she is only using him, Haruko feeds the boy to the core as it enters the giant hand to commence Medical Mechanica's order to terraform the planet and purge humanity of independent thought. While Haruko intended for Atomsk to fully manifest this time compared to the previous partial manifestations, she is livid to find Naota as the being's host after emerging from Canti who separated from the giant hand to prevent the Medical Mechanica plant's activation. Creating a fused Gibson Flying V/EB-0 1961 Gibson bass guitar, Naota overpowers Haruko in an epic battle before he stops short and declare his love for her, kissing her while allowing Atomsk to fully emerge from his N.O. channel. Atomsk consumes the terminal core and blasts into space, Haruko taking the fused guitar while chasing after Atomsk. Naota finds Haruko's previous guitar lying amongst the rubble, which Mamimi takes a picture of, inspiring her to leave Mabase and pursue a photography career. In the epilogue, life slightly returns to normal in Mabase with Canti still living with the Nandaba Family as Naota and his friends begin middle school. But the final scene of Haruko's guitar string being plucked on its own hints at the possibility of her return.
