= A Swingin' Safari =

1962 single by Bert Kaempfert

Single by Bert Kaempfert

from the album A Swingin' Safari
- B-side: "Black Beauty"
- Released: 1962
- Recorded: December 1961 and March 1962
- Studio: Polydor Studio, Hamburg-Rahlstedt
- Label: Polydor, Decca
- Songwriter: Bert Kaempfert

Bert Kaempfert singles chronology
"Wonderland by Night" (1961)	"A Swingin' Safari" (1962)	"Afrikaan Beat" (1962)

Official audio
- A Swingin' Safari on YouTube

A Swingin' Safari
- Original album cover

Studio album by Bert Kaempfert and His Orchestra
- Recorded: 1962
- Label: Polydor Records

Bert Kaempfert and His Orchestra chronology
With a Sound in My Heart (1962)	A Swingin' Safari (1962)	That Happy Feeling (1962)

Singles from A Swingin' Safari
- 1. "That Happy Feeling" Released: April 3, 1962; 2. "A Swingin' Safari" Released: June 22, 1962

"A Swingin' Safari"

Single by Billy Vaughn

from the album A Swingin' Safari
- B-side: "Indian Love Call"
- Released: June 1962
- Recorded: 1962
- Genre: Instrumental
- Length: 2:15
- Label: Dot
- Songwriter: Bert Kaempfert
- Producer: Randy Wood

Billy Vaughn singles chronology
"Continental Melody" (1962)	"A Swingin' Safari" (1962)	"Blue Flame" (1962)

"A Swingin' Safari" is a 1962 instrumental composed by Bert Kaempfert. It was recorded by Kaempfert on Polydor Records and released in the United States on Decca Records. The song features a distinctive main theme played on the piccolo as substitute for the traditional tin whistle, and a trumpet solo by Manfred "Fred" Moch. The prominent bass line is by Ladi Geisler. Kaempfert's recording of the song did not reach the charts, but a near-simultaneous cover by Billy Vaughn reached #13 on the U.S. Billboard Hot 100 and No. 5 on the Easy Listening chart.

== A Swingin' Safari (album) ==
The song was the title track of an LP consisting of orchestrations of the South African kwela style of penny-whistle music popular in the 1950s. The album was credited to "Bert Kaempfert and His Orchestra".

This album was first released in the U.S. in August 1962 under the title That Happy Feeling and had climbed to Number 14 in the charts by September of that year. It was then released on the European market with the title A Swingin' Safari in autumn of the same year.

=== Tracklist ===
The album tracks were written as follows:

1. "A Swingin' Safari" – Bert Kaempfert (3:06)
2. "That Happy Feeling" – Guy Warren (2:54)
3. "Market Day" – Kaempfert (2:31)
4. "Take Me" – Kaempfert, Helmut Brüsewitz (3:01)
5. "Similau" – Arden Clar, Harry Coleman (2:56)
6. "Zambesi" – Anton de Waal, Bob Hilliard, Nico Carstens (2:48)
7. "Afrikaan Beat" – Kaempfert (2:26)
8. "Happy Trumpeter" – Kaempfert (2:37)
9. "Tootie Flutie" – Kaempfert (2:09)
10. "Wimoweh" – Paul Campbell, Roy Ilene (2:41)
11. "Black Beauty" – Kaempfert, Cedric Dumont (2:34)
12. "Skokiaan" – August Msarurgwa, Tom Glazer (2:49)

=== Certifications ===
Region	Certification	Certified units/sales
Australia (ARIA)	Gold	35,000^{^}
^{^} Shipments figures based on certification alone.

== Billy Vaughn version ==
In 1962, the same year as the release of the original, Billy Vaughn recorded the song "A Swingin' Safari" as a cover; his version reached #13 on the U.S. Billboard Hot 100 and No. 5 on the Easy Listening chart that summer. On Cash Box, the song peaked at No. 11. In Canada it reached No. 19.

== Use in media ==
- The Bert Kaempfert version of "A Swingin' Safari" served as the original theme music to the television game show The Match Game, from 1962 to 1967.
- The Kaempfert version is also featured as the main theme in the Swedish game show called Vi i femman, where two teams of fifth-graders compete against each other.
- In 1971, the song was used as the theme music to the Blue Peter Royal Safari.
- In the 1970s, the song was used as the theme for the African Safari shortwave broadcasts on the Voice of America.
- In 2009, the song was played over the closing credits of the Australian animated film Mary and Max.
- In 2017, the song was used extensively by the European furniture retailer DFS, in both TV and radio advertising campaigns.
- In 2018, it lent its title to the Australian comedy film Swinging Safari, set in the 1970s. The track featured in the soundtrack, and the album cover was seen on screen when a character showed off his collection of popular LPs.
- In 2025, it was used as the closing title song on the BBC short sitcom "Mandy".
