= Swinging Safari (film) =

- Theatrical film poster
- Directed by: Stephan Elliott
- Written by: Stephan Elliott
- Produced by: Al Clark; Jamie Hilton
- Starring: Guy Pearce; Kylie Minogue; Radha Mitchell; Julian McMahon; Asher Keddie; Jeremy Sims; Atticus Robb; Darcey Wilson; Jack Thompson
- Narrated by: Richard Roxburgh
- Cinematography: Brad Shield
- Edited by: Sue Blainey; Laurie Hughes; Annette Davey
- Music by: Guy Gross
- Production companies: Screen Australia; Piccadilly Pictures; SQN Capital; Screen Queensland; Screen NSW; Cutting Edge; Wildheart Films; See Pictures
- Distributed by: Becker Film Group
- Release date: January 18, 2018
- Running time: 97 minutes
- Country: Australia
- Language: English
- Box office: $1.2 million

Swinging Safari is a 2018 Australian comedy-drama film starring Guy Pearce, Kylie Minogue, Radha Mitchell, Julian McMahon, Asher Keddie, and Jeremy Sims. It was written and directed by Stephan Elliott, most famous for his work on the film The Adventures of Priscilla, Queen of the Desert, released in 1994. Swinging Safari was released in Australia on 18 January 2018, with international territories following later in the year. Originally titled Flammable Children, the final title references the 1962 global hit "A Swingin' Safari" by Bert Kaempfert. The tune is heard on the soundtrack and its album cover is seen on screen during the film.

== Cast ==
Hall Family

- Guy Pearce as Keith Hall
- Kylie Minogue as Kaye Hall
- Jesse Denyer as Gerome Hall
- Jacob Kotan as Andrew Hall
- Alex Kotan as Damien Hall
- Chelsea Jamieson as Liz Hall
- Ava Taylor as Keira Hall

Jones Family

- Radha Mitchell as Jo Jones
- Julian McMahon as Rick Jones
- Darcey Wilson as Melly Jones
  - Imogen Hess as Young Melly
- Ethan Robinson as Liam Jones
- James Calder as Cal Jones

Marsh Family

- Asher Keddie as Gale Marsh
- Jeremy Sims as Bob Marsh
- Atticus Robb as Jeff Marsh
  - Richard Roxburgh as Adult Jeff (The Narrator)
  - Oscar Bailey as Young Jeff
- Chelsea Glaw as Bec Marsh

Other characters

- Jack Thompson as The Mayor
- Jacob Elordi as Rooster
- Drew Jarvis as Jehovah's Witness
- Sebastien Golenko as Dog
- Monette Lee as Mrs. Wilson
- Marcus Guinane as Mr. Logan
- Caleb Monk as Nigel Frost
- Renaud Jadin as Dave
- Stephan Elliott as Cop

== Reception ==
On review aggregator Rotten Tomatoes, Swinging Safari has an approval rating of 75%, based on 28 reviews, with an average rating of 6.3/10. The website's critics consensus reads: "Swinging Safari gathers an entertaining ensemble to offer audiences a messy yet ultimately endearing comedy rich with period detail."
