= List of FLCL episodes =

The episodes of the Japanese original video animation series FLCL were directed by Kazuya Tsurumaki and produced by the FLCL Production Committee, which included Gainax, Production I.G, and Starchild Records. The English adaptation was licensed by Synch-Point, which released the DVDs and soundtrack. After Synch-Point went out of business, Funimation licensed and re-released the series on Blu-ray and DVD. The story follows Haruko Haruhara, a sociopathic alien drawn to the fictional Japanese suburb of Mabase by the Medical Meccanica building while weaseling in the lives of twelve-year-old Naota Nandaba in the first season and fourteen-year-old Hidomi Hibajiri in the second season as pawns in her agenda to acquire the being called Atomsk.

The first-season episodes aired in North America on Cartoon Network's Adult Swim programming block from August 4 to August 13, 2003.

Six pieces of theme music are used for the episodes; five opening themes and one closing theme. All the theme songs are by Japanese rock band the Pillows. The opening themes are: "One Life", used in episode one, "Instant Music" in episode two and three, "Happy Bivouac" for episode four, "Runners High", utilized in episode five, and "Carnival" in episode six. The closing theme is "Ride on Shooting Star", the series' main theme song, used for all episodes. Geneon Entertainment has released three original soundtracks encompassing the aforementioned songs, with soundtracks titled Addict, released on January 20, 2004, King of Pirates, released on September 7, 2004, and FLCL No. 3, released on June 7, 2005.

Six DVD compilations, each containing one episode, were released in Japan by Gainax. In addition, a DVD collection box, containing all six DVD compilations, was released in Japan on August 13, 2005. Three compilations were released by Synch-Point in North America. A DVD collection, containing all six was released on January 23, 2007. The series was re-picked up for distribution by Funimation in 2010 and released again on DVD and on Blu-ray in February 2011.

In 2016, two new seasons totaling 12 episodes were announced as a co-production between Production I.G, Toho and Adult Swim. The second season, FLCL Progressive, premiered on June 3, 2018, on Adult Swim's Toonami block, while the third season, FLCL Alternative, premiered on September 8, 2018. In Japan, Alternative and Progressive had theatrical screenings in September 2018. The first episode of FLCL Alternative unexpectedly premiered on April Fools' Day 2018 at midnight on Toonami in Japanese with English subtitles.

Two additional seasons were ordered by Adult Swim in March 2022, which were announced on Toonami's 25th anniversary, titled FLCL: Grunge and FLCL: Shoegaze. Grunge aired from September 10 to 24, 2023, while Shoegaze premiered on October 1 of the same year.

== Series overview ==
Season	Episodes	Originally released		Title
Season	Episodes	First released	Last released	Title
1	6	April 26, 2000	March 16, 2001	FLCL
2	6	June 3, 2018	July 7, 2018	Progressive
3	6	September 8, 2018 (Note: The first episode of FLCL Alternative premiered unannounced in Japanese audio with English subtitles on April 1, 2018 at midnight ET as part of Adult Swim's April Fools' stunt. The date reflects the proper first run broadcast of the series.)	October 13, 2018	Alternative
4	3	September 10, 2023	September 24, 2023	Grunge
5	3	October 1, 2023	October 15, 2023	Shoegaze

== Episodes ==
=== Season 1: Classic (2000–2001) ===
No. overall	No. in season	Title	Directed by (Note: Information is taken from the ending credits of each episode.)	Written by	Storyboarded by	Japanese release date	English air date
1	1	"Fooly Cooly"; Transliteration: "Furi Kuri" (Japanese: フリクリ)	Masahiko Ōtsuka	Yōji Enokido	Kazuya Tsurumaki, Hiroyuki Imaishi, Yoh Yoshinari	April 26, 2000	August 5, 2003
2	2	"Fire Starter"; Transliteration: "Faisuta" (Japanese: ファイスタ)	Ken Andō	Yōji Enokido	Masayuki	June 21, 2000	August 6, 2003
3	3	"Marquis de Carabas"; Transliteration: "Maru Raba" (Japanese: マルラバ)	Shouji Saeki	Yōji Enokido	Shouji Saeki	August 23, 2000	August 7, 2003
4	4	"Full Swing"; Transliteration: "Furi Kiri" (Japanese: フリキリ)	Masahiko Ōtsuka	Yōji Enokido	Nobutoshi Ogura	October 25, 2000	August 8, 2003
5	5	"Brittle Bullet"; Transliteration: "Burabure" (Japanese: ブラブレ)	Shouji Saeki	Yōji Enokido	Hiroyuki Imaishi	December 21, 2000	August 12, 2003
6	6	"FLCLimax"; Transliteration: "Furi Kura (Note: The Japanese title is actually an alteration made by Haruko on the phrase "funi funi, funi kura" (フニフニ. フニクラ). The episode's title is not meant to have any actual significance.)" (Japanese: フリクラ)	Masahiko Ōtsuka	Yōji Enokido	Kazuya Tsurumaki, Tadashi Hiramatsu, Hiroyuki Imaishi	March 16, 2001	August 13, 2003

=== Season 2: Progressive (2018) ===
No. overall	No. in season	Title	Animated by	Directed by	Written by	Storyboarded by	Original release date
7	1	"Re:Start"; Transliteration: "Saisuta" (Japanese: サイスタ)	Production I.G	Kazuto Arai	Hideto Iwai	Kazuto Arai	June 3, 2018
8	2	"Freebie Honey"; Transliteration: "Furihani" (Japanese: フリハニ)	Production GoodBook	Toshihisa Kaiya	Hideto Iwai	Toshihisa Kaiya	June 10, 2018
9	3	"Stone Skipping"; Transliteration: "Mizukiri" (Japanese: ミズキリ)	Production I.G	Yuki Ogawa	Hideto Iwai	Yuki Ogawa	June 17, 2018
10	4	"LooPQR"; Transliteration: "Rarirure" (Japanese: ラリルレ)	Production I.G	Yoshihide Ibata	Hideto Iwai	Yoshihide Ibata	June 24, 2018
11	5	"Fool on the Planet"; Transliteration: "Furupura" (Japanese: フルプラ)	Signal.MD	Kei Suezawa	Hideto Iwai	Kei Suezawa	June 30, 2018
12	6	"Our Running"; Transliteration: "Awaran" (Japanese: アワラン)	Production I.G	Hiroshi Ikehata	Hideto Iwai	Hiroshi Ikehata	July 7, 2018

=== Season 3: Alternative (2018) ===
No. overall	No. in season	Title	Animated by	Directed by	Written by	Storyboarded by	Original release date
13	1	"Flying Memory"; Transliteration: "Fura Memo" (Japanese: フラメモ)	NUT	Yutaka Uemura	Hideto Iwai	Yutaka Uemura, Hiromi Taniguchi	April 1, 2018 (April Fools, Japanese) September 8, 2018 (English)
14	2	"Grown-Up Wannabe"; Transliteration: "Tonaburi" (Japanese: トナブリ)	Revoroot	Yutaka Uemura	Hideto Iwai	Kiyotaka Suzuki	September 15, 2018
15	3	"Freestyle Collection"; Transliteration: "Furikore" (Japanese: フリコレ)	Revoroot	Yutaka Uemura	Hideto Iwai	Nobukage Kimura	September 22, 2018
16	4	"Pit-a-Pat"; Transliteration: "Pitapato" (Japanese: ピタパト)	NUT	Yutaka Uemura	Hideto Iwai	Jun Shishido, Hiromi Taniguchi, Yutaka Uemura	September 29, 2018
17	5	"Shake It Off"; Transliteration: "Furisute" (Japanese: フリステ)	Revoroot	Yutaka Uemura	Hideto Iwai	Keisuke Kojima	October 6, 2018
18	6	"Full Flat"; Transliteration: "Furufura" (Japanese: フルフラ)	NUT	Yutaka Uemura	Hideto Iwai	Toshiro Fujii	October 13, 2018

=== Season 4: Grunge (2023) ===
No. overall	No. in season	Title	Directed by	Written by	Storyboarded by	Original release date
19	1	"Shinpachi" (Japanese: シンパチ)	Hitoshi Takekiyo	Tetsuhiro Ideka	Hitoshi Takekiyo	September 10, 2023
20	2	"Shonari" (Japanese: ショウナリ)	Hitoshi Takekiyo	Tetsuhiro Ideka	Hitoshi Takekiyo	September 17, 2023
21	3	"Orinoko" (Japanese: オリノコ)	Hitoshi Takekiyo	Tetsuhiro Ideka	Hitoshi Takekiyo	September 24, 2023

=== Season 5: Shoegaze (2023) ===
No. overall	No. in season	Title	Directed by	Written by	Storyboarded by	Original release date
22	1	"Furu-Bari (Full Barricade)" (Japanese: フルバリ)	Yutaka Uemura	Kenta Ihara	Naoto Uchida	October 1, 2023
23	2	"Gene-Bato (Generational Battle)" (Japanese: ジェネバト)	Yutaka Uemura	Kenta Ihara	Fumie Muroi	October 8, 2023
24	3	"Far-Fre (Far Friend)" (Japanese: ファーフレ)	Yutaka Uemura	Kenta Ihara	Taku Kimura	October 15, 2023

== Compilation films ==
In September 2018, Toho theatrically released the FLCL Progressive and FLCL Alternative sequel seasons as compilation films. They are exclusive to Japan.

No.	Title	Directed by	Written by	Japanese release date
1	"FLCL Alternative: The Movie"; Transliteration: "Gekijō-ban Furi Kuri Orutana" (Japanese: 劇場版 フリクリ オルタナ)	Katsuyuki Motohiro (chief) Yutaka Uemura	Hideto Iwai	September 7, 2018
A film compilation of the FLCL Alternative television season.
2	"FLCL Progressive: The Movie"; Transliteration: "Gekijō-ban Furi Kuri Purogure" (Japanese: 劇場版 フリクリ プログレ)	Katsuyuki Motohiro (chief)	Hideto Iwai	September 28, 2018
A film compilation of the FLCL Progressive television season.

== See also ==
- List of FLCL characters
- Discography of FLCL
