= Bert Kaempfert =

German composer (1923–1980)

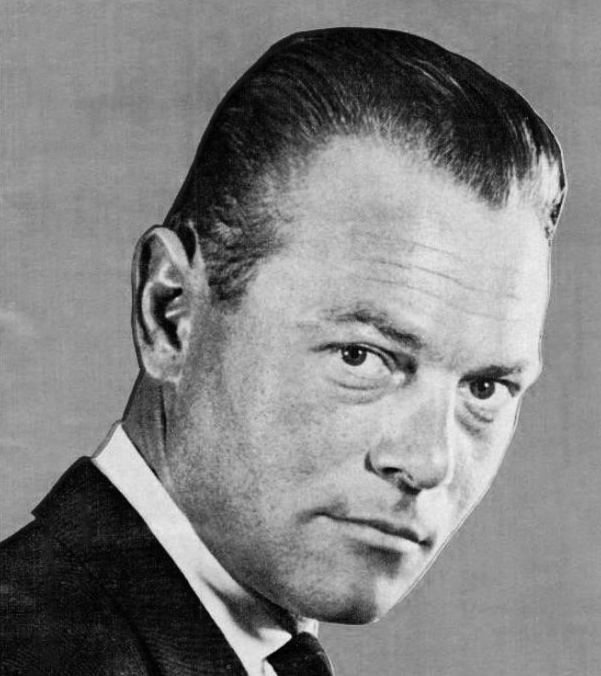
- Kaempfert in 1967

Background information
- Born: Berthold Heinrich Kämpfert; 16 October 1923; Barmbek, Hamburg, Germany
- Died: 21 June 1980 (aged 56) Mallorca, Spain
- Genres: Easy listening, instrumental, jazz, big band, Exotica
- Occupations: Orchestra leader, composer
- Instruments: Trumpet, accordion, clarinet, piano, saxophone
- Years active: 1939–1980
- Labels: Polydor, Decca USA, MCA
- Website: www.kaempfert.de/en/

Bert Kaempfert (born Berthold Heinrich Kämpfert; 16 October 1923 – 21 June 1980) was a German orchestra leader, multi-instrumentalist, music producer, arranger, and composer. He made easy listening and jazz-orientated records and wrote the music for a number of well-known songs, including "Strangers in the Night", "Danke Schoen", "Moon over Naples" and "A Swingin' Safari". In 1961, Kaempfert was the first to produce professional music recordings by the Beatles.

== Early life and career ==
Kaempfert was born in Hamburg, Germany, where he received his lifelong nickname, Fips, and studied at the Hamburg School of Music. A multi-instrumentalist who played accordion, piano, clarinet, and other instruments, he was hired by Hans Busch to play with his orchestra, before serving as a bandsman in the German Navy during World War II. He later formed his own big band and toured with them, following that by working as an arranger and producer, making hit records with Freddy Quinn and Ivo Robić. Kaempfert met his future wife, Hannelore, in 1945. They married a year later, on 14 August 1946. They had two daughters, Marion and Doris.

=== Bert Kaempfert & His Orchestra ===
Kaempfert's first hit with his orchestra was "Wonderland by Night". Recorded in July 1959, the song could not get released in Germany, so Kaempfert took the track to Decca Records in New York, which released it in the United States in the fall of 1960. With its haunting solo trumpet by Charles Tabor, muted brass, and lush strings, the single topped the American pop charts and turned Bert Kaempfert and Orchestra into international stars. Over the next few years, he revived such pop tunes as "Tenderly", "Red Roses for a Blue Lady", "Three O'Clock in the Morning", and "Bye Bye Blues", as well as composing pieces of his own, including "Spanish Eyes" (a.k.a. "Moon Over Naples"), "Danke Schoen", and "Wooden Heart", which were recorded by, respectively, Al Martino, Wayne Newton, and Elvis Presley. For Kaempfert, little brought him more personal satisfaction than Nat King Cole recording his "L-O-V-E".

Kaempfert's orchestra made extensive use of horns. A couple of numbers that featured brass prominently, "Magic Trumpet" and "The Mexican Shuffle", were played by both Kaempfert's orchestra and by Herb Alpert & the Tijuana Brass. The Brass covered "Magic Trumpet", and Kaempfert returned the favor by covering Brass compadre Sol Lake's number "The Mexican Shuffle". The latter tune evolved into a TV ad, The Teaberry Shuffle.

=== Promotion of the Beatles ===
In his capacity as record producer, Kaempfert played a part in the rise of the Beatles. In 1961, he hired them to back Tony Sheridan on an album called My Bonnie. Sheridan had been performing in Hamburg, and needed to recruit a band to play behind him on the proposed tracks. Kaempfert auditioned and signed the Beatles, and recorded two tracks with them during his sessions for Sheridan: "Ain't She Sweet" (sung by rhythm guitarist John Lennon) and "Cry for a Shadow" (an instrumental written by Lennon and lead guitarist George Harrison). The album and its singles, released by Polydor Records, were the Beatles' first commercially released recordings.

On 28 October 1961, a customer in the Liverpool music store owned by Brian Epstein asked for a copy of "My Bonnie". The store did not have it, but Epstein noted the request. He was so intrigued by the idea of a Liverpool band releasing a record that he investigated. That led to his discovery of the Beatles and, through his efforts, their signing by George Martin to Parlophone Records after Kaempfert helped them avoid any contractual claim from Polydor.

== Songwriting ==
Throughout the 1960s, various artists recorded renditions of Kaempfert's music:

- "Strangers in the Night" (with words by Charles Singleton and Eddie Snyder) was originally recorded as part of his score for the 1966 film A Man Could Get Killed. It became a number one hit for Frank Sinatra in 1966, despite Sinatra's hatred of the song. This was followed a year later with another hit for Sinatra, "The World We Knew (Over and Over)".
- "Wooden Heart", sung by Elvis Presley in the film G.I. Blues, was a hit in 1961. Joe Dowell's cover of "Wooden Heart" became a big hit, reaching number one on the Billboard Hot 100 on August 28, 1961. Kaempfert arranged the traditional German folk song "Muss i denn" for the Presley movie.
- His instrumental "Moon Over Naples", when given words by Snyder, became "Spanish Eyes", originally a hit for Al Martino and also recorded by Engelbert Humperdinck, Presley, and many others.
- "Danke Schoen", with words added by Kurt Schwabach and Milt Gabler, became Wayne Newton's signature song.
- "L-O-V-E", with words added by Milt Gabler, was a hit for Nat King Cole.
- "Almost There", which reached No. 67 on the U.S. charts but No. 2 on the U.K. charts, was recorded by Andy Williams.
- His 1962 movie theme from the film 90 Minuten nach Mitternacht (Terror After Midnight), with lyrics added by Herb Rehbein and Joe Seneca, became a pop ballad called "Love After Midnight", recorded by both Patti Page (1964) and Jack Jones (1966).
- A jazzier number called "A Swingin' Safari" was the theme tune for the long-running TV game show The Match Game, used on the NBC version from 1962 to 1967. The composer received credit for the theme ("Music by Bert Kaempfert") but the recording was an American cover version by the Billy Vaughn orchestra.
- Another 1962 single, "That Happy Feeling", became well known as background music for children's television programming, most notably that of Sandy Becker on his daily WNEW-TV (now WNYW) show in New York between 1963 and 1967.
- The LP A Swingin' Safari was heavily influenced by South African kwela style music, containing versions of "Zambesi", "Wimoweh", "Skokiaan", and "Afrikaan Beat", as well as the title track. Many of the tracks were later used in the film An Elephant Called Slowly (1969).
- "Tahitian Sunset" was sampled extensively by the lo-fi dance artists Lemon Jelly as their track "In the Bath".

In 1963, jazz trumpeter Bobby Hackett recorded a complete album with 12 Kaempfert compositions, Bobby Hackett Plays the Music of Bert Kaempfert. It was re-released in the United States under the Sony Records label in the Collectable Jazz Classics series, along with the album Bobby Hackett Plays The Music of Henry Mancini on a "2-in-1" CD.

In 1967, jazz clarinetist Pete Fountain recorded the album Pete Fountain Plays Bert Kaempfert in Hamburg, Germany, with musicians from Kaempfert's orchestra. It featured Kaempfert's signature hits.

In 1967, the Anita Kerr Singers released the LP Bert Kaempfert Turns Us On!, a tribute to Kaempfert, featuring the standard hits.

In 1967, Jimi Hendrix included the melody of "Strangers in the Night" in his improvised guitar solo for his guitar-burning version of "Wild Thing" at the Monterey Pop Festival.

In 1968, jazz trumpeter Al Hirt recorded the album Al Hirt Plays Bert Kaempfert. It too featured Kaempfert's major hits. That year, BMI awarded accolades to five of Kaempfert's songs: "Lady", "Spanish Eyes", "Strangers in the Night", "The World We Knew", and "Sweet Maria". Many of his hits during the 1960s were composed and arranged with the help of German Herb Rehbein, who became a successful bandleader in his own right. Rehbein's death in 1979 shook Kaempfert deeply. Both Kaempfert and Rehbein were posthumously inducted into the Songwriters Hall of Fame.

In 1970, Johnny Mathis issued a double LP, Sings the Music of Bacharach & Kaempfert, for Columbia. It consisted of 21 tracks in a heavyweight gatefold picture sleeve. The Kaempfert tracks were done in his arrangement style, and the Bacharach tracks were done in the American's unique upbeat style. The same year, Kaempfert composed the score for the war film You Can't Win 'Em All, starring Tony Curtis and Charles Bronson.

By the 1970s, sales of Kaempfert's music had declined, but he continued to record. His version of the "Theme from Shaft" was admired by composer Isaac Hayes and remained popular with audiences. He expanded the musical scope of his band and recorded in a wide variety of styles. He also began to play live concerts with his orchestra, beginning in 1974, with an appearance at the Royal Albert Hall in London.

Kaempfert is sampled in the 1998 song "One Week" by the Barenaked Ladies. The song's lyrics also declare that "Bert Kaempfert's got the mad hits".

== Collaborations ==
Kaempfert used many musicians who were available in West Germany and other parts of Europe, including many of the same players who played for James Last, Kai Warner, and Roberto Delgado. He featured such top soloists as trumpeters Charly Tabor, Werner Gutterer, Manfred Moch, and Ack van Rooyen, trombonists Åke Persson and Jiggs Whigham, and sax/flute player Herb Geller. Drummer Rolf Ahrens supplied the characteristically simple but steady beat, often playing just a snare drum with brushes.

Another contributor to Kaempfert's music was guitarist/bassist Ladislav "Ladi" Geisler, who popularized the "knackbass" (crackling bass) sound, initially playing a Gibson EB and later a Fender Jazz Bass Guitar, which became the most distinctive feature of many Kaempfert recordings — a treble staccato bass guitar sound in which the bass string was plucked with a pick and immediately suppressed to cancel out any sustain. An acoustic bass played a simple pattern in unison with this staccato electric bass, which created a unique sound. It was Geisler who lent his guitar amplifier to The Beatles for their recording session with Tony Sheridan, after the band's own equipment proved to be inadequate for recording purposes.

== Death and legacy ==
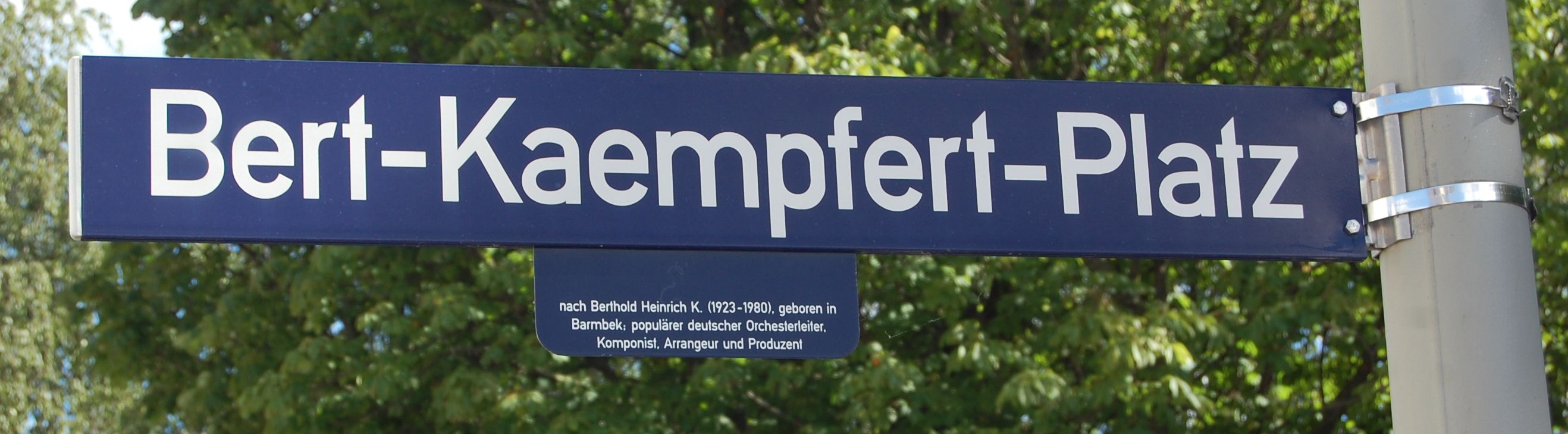
Street sign for Bert-Kaempfert-Platz, a place in Hamburg, Germany named in Kaempfert's honour.

Kaempfert died suddenly following a stroke at his home in Mallorca on 21 June 1980, at the age of 56, shortly after a successful appearance in the United Kingdom.

Bert-Kaempfert-Platz, a square in the Barmbek district of Hamburg, Germany, is named after him.

Kaempfert appears as a character in the 1994 film Backbeat, played by actor Wolf Kahler.

== Discography ==
Titles are for European releases; the N.A. release may have a different title.

=== North American singles ===
- "Cerveza" (U.S. No. 108, Music Vendor, 1959, his first U.S. chart single; re-charted U.S. No. 73, 1961)
- "Wonderland by Night" (U.S. No. 1, CAN No. 1 (seven weeks), 1961)
- "Tenderly" (U.S. No. 31, CAN No. 34, 1961)
- "Now and Forever" (U.S. No. 48, AC No. 14, CAN No. 8, 1961)
- "A Swingin' Safari" (1962)
- "Afrikaan Beat" (U.S. No. 42, AC No. 10, CAN No. 13, 1962)
- "That Happy Feeling" (U.S. No. 67, 1962)
- '"Livin' it Up" (1963)
- "Holiday for Bells" (1963)
- "Jingo Jango" (1963)
- "Red Roses for a Blue Lady" (U.S. No. 11, AC No. 2, CAN No. 20, 1965)
- "Three O'Clock in the Morning" (U.S. No. 33, AC No. 10, 1965)
- "Moon Over Naples" (U.S. No. 59, AC No. 6, 1965)
- "Bye Bye Blues" (U.S. No. 54, AC No. 5, CAN No. 37, 1966)
- "Strangers in the Night" (AC No. 8, 1966)
- "I Can't Give You Anything But Love" (U.S. No. 100, AC No. 6, 1966)
- "Hold Me" (AC No. 37, 1967)
- "Talk" (AC No. 39, 1967)
- "Caravan" (AC No. 10, 1968)
- "The First Waltz" (AC No. 30, 1968)
- "Mister Sandman" (AC No. 12, 1968)
- "(You Are) My Way of Life" (AC No. 17, 1968)
- "Games People Play" (AC No. 30, 1969)
- "The Maltese Melody" (1969)
- "Someday We'll Be Together" (AC No. 27, 1970)
- "Sweet Caroline (Good Times Never Seemed So Good)" (AC No. 24, 1971)
- "Love Theme" (1970)
- "Only a Fool (Would Lose You)" (1972) - a very brief foray into music with proper words.

=== Albums ===
- April in Portugal (1958)
- Ssh! It's Bert Kaempfert & His Orchestra (1959)
- Combo Capers (1960)
- Wonderland by Night (1960)
- The Wonderland of Bert Kaempfert (1961)
- Dancing in Wonderland (1961)
- Afrikaan Beat and Other Favorites (1962)
- With a Sound in My Heart (1962)
- A Swingin' Safari (1962)
- That Happy Feeling (1962)
- 90 Minuten nach Mitternacht (1962)
- Dreaming in Wonderland (1963)
- Living It Up (1963)
- Christmas Wonderland (1963)
- That Latin Feeling (1964)
- Blue Midnight (1964)
- Let's Go Bowling (1964)
- The Magic Music of Far Away Places (1965)
- Love Letters (1965)
- Bye Bye Blues (1965)
- Three O'Clock in the Morning (1965)
- A Man Could Get Killed (1966)
- Strangers in the Night (1966)
- Greatest Hits (1966)
- Hold Me (1967)
- The World We Knew (1967)
- Bert Kaempfert's Best (1967)
- Bert Kaempfert/Pete Fountain (MCA Double Star Series DL 734698) (1967)
- Love That Bert Kaempfert (1967)
- My Way of Life (1968)
- Ivo Robic singt Kaempfert-Erfolge (with Ivo Robic, 1968)
- One Lonely Night (1969)
- Traces of Love (1969)
- The Kaempfert Touch (1970)
- Free and Easy (1970)
- Orange Coloured Sky (1971)
- Bert Kaempfert Now! (1971)
- 6 Plus 6 (1972)
- Yesterday and Today (1973)
- To the Good Life (1973)
- Greatest Hits Volume 2 (1973)
- The Most Beautiful Girl (1974)
- Gallery (1974)
- Live in London (1974)
- Golden Memories (1975)
- Forever My Love (1975)
- Kaempfert '76 (1976)
- Safari Swings Again (1977)
- Tropical Sunrise (1977)
- Swing (1978)
- In Concert (with Sylvia Vrethammar, 1979; also released as a video)
- Smile (1979)
