= Horst Wende =

Horst Wende (5 November 1919 – 23 January 1996) was a German bandleader, arranger and composer. He made easy-listening records under his own name as well as under the name Roberto Delgado. He was part of the wave of German-based easy-listening artists who were popular in the 1960s and 1970s, along with Bert Kaempfert and James Last.

== Biography ==
Born in Zeitz, Saxony, he showed musical proficiency at an early age. He played in his grandfather's band in a restaurant when he was six, and by his teens he was accomplished at playing piano, accordion, xylophone and marimba. He studied music at the Leipzig Conservatory.

He served in the German Army during World War II, but was captured by the British. During his captivity in a Danish prisoner-of-war camp, he met a guitarist named Ladi Geisler, with whom he soon formed a small combo. After the war, he led various combos (which usually included Geisler) in the Salambo Night Club from René Durand & The Tarantella Night Club near the famous Reeperbahn. Horst also played with British Service musicians and big bands such as Edmundo Ros. Settling in Hamburg, he became part of the burgeoning music scene in the port city. Signed to the Polydor label in the 1950s, as a composer, producer and musician he made accordion and dance band music under his own name. He also started with Middle & South America music recordings under the alias of Roberto Delgado, and with piano albums as Mister Pepper. The Delgado albums became popular in Europe, and then found an audience in the UK, Japan and North America and Australia as Polydor opened up several international subsidiaries. It is interesting to note that Wende recorded his albums using the same group of studio musicians who recorded for Kaempfert and Last; in fact, guitarist Ladi Geisler also provided the distinct knack-bass guitar to the Kaempfert sound.

The Delgado recordings were initially Latin-oriented, but they eventually covered a number of different musical genres including African, Italian, Jewish, Oriental, Russian, Greek and Jamaican music as well as Broadway musicals and current pop hits. It could be argued that Wende/Delgado helped to pioneer world music. He managed to break into the German singles market with his version of "Mexico" in 1962. He also arranged music for other German artists such as German folk/pop singer Knut Kiesewetter. Horst made several albums with great international singers including Conny Froboess, Wencke Myhre, Katja Ebstein, Daliah Lavi and Freddy Quinn.

Like most of his pop orchestral contemporaries, Wende's popularity had faded by the 1980s, and he gradually retired from playing music professionally. In recent years, his music has become popular again, and some of his recordings have been reissued on CD. His work is still much loved and remembered by the many who heard his work. His song "Skokiaan", from the 1958 album Africana, is used at the end of Richard Linklater's film Slacker (1990).

== Selected discography ==
HW - released under the name Horst Wende

RD - released under the name Roberto Delgado

MP - released under the name Mister Pepper

LG - released under the name Ladi Geisler with the Horst Wende Orchestra

- The following complete Horst Wende Orchestra / Mister Pepper / Roberto Delgado Orchestra list is from Marty Goorts.
- The released years are always pressed in the original records like the list below.
- 1955 International Polka Favourites HW
- 1957 Romance Em Veneca RD
- 1957 Oriëntal Caravan HW
- 1958 Africana HW
- 1959 Love Letters RD
- 1960 Dance To Delgado RD
- 1960 Blaue Nacht Am Hafen HW
- 1961 In Strikt Danstempo HW
- 1962 Bei Pfeiffers Ist Ball HW
- 1962 Portrait Of Horst Wende
- 1962 Portrait Of Roberto Delgado
- 1962 Along Mexican Highways Vol. 1 RD
- 1963 Delgado Hits Pan Americana
- 1963 Latin Americana RD
- 1964 Olé Roberto Delgado RD
- 1964 Night Club Dancing Vol. 1 RD
- 1964 This Is Roberto Delgado RD
- 1965 Letkiss RD
- 1965 Sirtaki Letkiss RD
- 1965 Blue Hawaii Vol. 1 RD
- 1965 Caramba Vol. 1 RD
- 1965 Along Mexican Highways Vol. 2 RD
- 1965 Die Original Schwarzwaldfamilie Seitz HW
- 1965 South Of The Border RD
- 1965 Camino De Mexico RD
- 1965 Night Club Dancing Vol. 2 RD
- 1966 Tanz Durch's Musical Wunderland RD
- 1966 Show Dancing RD
- 1966 Italian Romance RD
- 1966 Delgado Dancing RD
- 1966 Accordion A La Carte Vol. 1 HW
- 1966 Tanz In Der Taverne RD
- 1967 Holiday In Israël RD (This album - Polydor 184 094 - is incorrectly billed as a Roberto Delgado album)
- 1967 Drops MP
- 1967 Caramba Vol. 2 RD
- 1967 Happy Harmonica HW
- 1968 Holiday In Scandinavia RD
- 1968 Acapulco Holiday RD
- 1968 Guitar A La Carte Vol. 1 LG
- 1968 Wenn Das Schifferklavier An Bord Ertönt HW
- 1968 Tanz Im Weissen Rössl RD
- 1968 Marimba A La Carte RD
- 1968 Dancing Rebecca RD
- 1968 Latino Dancing RD
- 1968 Blue Hawaii Vol. 2 RD
- 1968 Spanish Eyes RD
- 1968 Hifi Stereo RD
- 1969 Accordion In Gold HW
- 1969 Latin Rendez-Vous With RD
- 1969 Guitar A La Carte Vol. 2 LG
- 1969 Accordion A La Carte Vol. 2 HW
- 1969 Hits A La Carte RD
- 1969 Latin A La Carte RD
- 1969 This Is Roberto Delgado
- 1970 Hawaiian Nights RD
- 1970 Calypso A La Carte RD
- 1970 This Is Reggae RD
- 1970 Caramba Vol. 3 RD
- 1970 The Very Best Of Roberto Delgado
- 1970 Vibraphone A La Carte RD
- 1970 African Dancing RD
- 1970 Samba Caramba South America Olé RD
- 1970 Latin Flutes RD
- 1970 Accordéon HW
- 1971 South America Let's Dance RD
- 1972 Happy Accordion HW
- 1972 Latin Special '72 RD
- 1972 Wir Stehen Auf Akkordeon Vol. 1 HW
- 1973 Fiësta For Dancing Vol. 1 RD
- 1973 Happy South America Stargala RD
- 1974 Die Bouzouki Klingt Vol. 1 RD
- 1974 Wir Stehen Auf Akkordeon Vol. 2 HW
- 1974 Dance Time With Roberto Delgado
- 1974 Roberto Delgado
- 1975 Fiësta For Dancing Vol. 2 RD
- 1975 20 South America Dancing Hits RD
- 1975 South America My Love RD
- 1976 Akkordeon Schlager-Parade HW
- 1976 Akkordeon Schlager-Parade Zug Um Zug HW
- 1976 Die Bouzouki Klingt Vol. 2 RD
- 1976 Latin Rhythms RD
- 1977 Die Grossen Orchester Der Welt RD
- 1977 Die Grosse Aktuelle Hammond Schlager-Parade HW
- 1977 Fiësta For Dancing Vol. 3 RD
- 1977 Die Grosse Aktuelle Akkordeon Hitparade HW
- 1977 Fiësta Caramba 2000 RD
- 1977 The Best Of The Best Of Roberto Delgado
- 1977 Fiësta For Dancing Vol. 4 RD
- 1977 Roberto Delgado In Gold
- 1977 Buenos Dias Olé RD
- 1977 Concerto D' Aranjuez RD
- 1978 Die Balalaika klingt RD
- 1978 Music Box Dancer RD
- 1979 Jamaica Disco RD
- 1979 Roberto Delgado Meets Kalinka
- 1980 Vacation In The Sun RD
- 1980 Fiësta Colombiana & Los Paraguayos RD
- 1980 Da Capo Roberto
- 1980 Tropical Sun Dance RD
- 1981 Blue Tropical RD
- 1996 El Humahuaqueno RD CD
- 1998 Happy South America RD 2CD
- 1999 Happy Holiday Collection RD 2CD
- 2000 Lounge Legends RD CD
- 2000 20 South America Dancing Hits RD CD
- 2000 Camino De Mexico RD CD
- 2009 Autour Du Monde RD CD
- 2011 Fiesta & Fiesta For Dancing RD 2CD
- 2013 Blue Hawaii RD 2CD
- 2014 Bouzouki Magic & Bouzouki King RD 2CD
- 2014 Jamaica Disco & Tropical Sun Dance & Dancing Queen RD 2CD
