= Christmas Wonderland =

Studio album by Bert Kaempfert
- Released: 1963
- Genre: Christmas
- Label: Decca
- Producer: Bert Kaempfert

Christmas Wonderland, also known as Christmas with Bert Kaempfert and Christmastide with Kaempfert, is an instrumental Christmas album by Bert Kaempfert and his orchestra from 1963. It is his only album of Christmas music.

== Track listing ==
No.	Title	Writer(s)	Length
1.	"The Little Drummer Boy"	Katherine Davis, Henry Onorati, Harry Simeone	2:54
2.	"Santa Claus Is Comin' to Town"	J. Fred Coots, Haven Gillespie	2:28
3.	"I Heard the Bells on Christmas Day"	Johnny Marks	2:40
4.	"Holiday for Bells"	Bert Kaempfert	2:22
5.	"Winter Wonderland"	Felix Bernard, Dick Smith	2:14
6.	"Children's Christmas Dream"	Kaempfert	3:23
7.	"Sleigh Ride"	Leroy Anderson, Mitchell Parish	2:32
8.	"White Christmas"	Irving Berlin	2:45
9.	"Toy Parade"	Kaempfert, Heinz Mihm	2:38
10.	"Christmas Wonderland"	Kaempfert, Herbert Rehbein	2:43
11.	"Jingo Jango"	Kaempfert, Rehbein	2:14
12.	"Jumpin' Jiminy Christmas"	Stanley Cowan, Jack Carroll	2:15
