= Manfred Moch =

German trumpeter (1930–2011)

Manfred Moch (15 May 1930 – 28 May 2011) was a German trumpet player. He made a name for himself in the 1960s as the featured solo trumpet player for the Bert Kaempfert orchestra, contributing memorable and melodic solos to many of Kaempfert's hits; such songs included "Bye Bye Blues", "Strangers in the Night”, "L-O-V-E" and "A Swingin' Safari" His association with Kaempfert ended in 1968 over a pay dispute, but by the late 1970s he was again playing sessions and concerts with Kaempfert, although not as a soloist. During the late 1960s, Moch recorded some trumpet duet albums with fellow Last/Kaempfert bandmate Heinz Habermann, which were released on the Decca label under the name The Tattoos.

Moch was also a long-time member of the James Last Orchestra during the 1960s and 1970s, and continued to play for Last as a session musician after leaving the touring band. Additionally he was a member of the NDR (Norddeutscher Rundfunk, or North German Radio) Big Band from the 1960s until the 1990s. He was also active as a session player in Hamburg, playing for many other popular German recording artists.

Moch died on 28 May 2011.
