= Ladi Geisler =

German musician (1927–2011)

Background information
- Also known as: "Ladi"
- Born: Ladislav Geisler; November 27, 1927; Prague, Czechoslovakia
- Died: November 19, 2011 (aged 83) Hamburg
- Genres: Easy listening, instrumental, jazz, big band
- Occupation: Musician
- Instruments: Guitar, Bass guitar, trumpet, violin
- Years active: 1945–2010
- Labels: Polydor, Bear Family

Miloslav Ladislav "Ladi" Geisler (November 27, 1927 – November 19, 2011) was a German musician who established a high profile in the post-war German music scene. Best known for his work with pop musicians Bert Kaempfert, James Last and Freddy Quinn, Geisler developed the distinctive "Knack-Bass" percussive bass sound that helped popularize the Bert Kaempfert Orchestra. He later released numerous records under his own name.

== Life and work ==
As a child, Geisler received violin lessons and soon learned the trumpet. He first worked as an engineer in the electric company where his father was as a director. In the last phase of World War II, Geisler was drafted into the German Air Force, where he worked on the combat aircraft Heinkel He 162. While on a mission, he was captured by the British and was interned in a Danish POW camp. With the help of a fellow prisoner, Geisler built an electric guitar and learned as a self-taught player. His role model was Oscar Moore, guitarist of singer Nat King Cole. In the camp he also made the acquaintance of the German musician Horst Wende, who brought him after discharge to Germany and made him a guitarist of his "Horst Wende Trio."

Geisler did some work for the NWDR, and after the spin-off of the NDR in 1955, he received a permanent position as a guitarist in the NDR Dance Orchestra under the direction of Franz Thon. Continuing to play with Wende, he signed a contract with the record company Polydor. In addition, while appearing with the Wende band in the Hamburg night club "Tarantella," Geisler met Freddy Quinn, with whom he developed a long-term recording relationship. Until the early 1960s Geisler participated in numerous recordings with Quinn.

By this time, Geisler had already become a known guitarist. At NDR he was used in many ways, such as with the NDR Symphony Orchestra and at the premiere of a work by Pierre Boulez at the Edinburgh Festival. In addition to Polydor, he also worked for other record companies and accompanied other singers like Evelyn Künneke, Greetje Kauffeld, Friedel Hensch, Esther and Abi Ofarim and Hildegard Knef.

From composer and big band leader James Last, he bought a late 50s Gibson EB bass guitar, with which he developed his legendary "Knack bass" sound that would become an integral feature in the Easy Listening orchestra of Bert Kaempfert. Later, he used a Fender Jazz Bass model. Most recently, he used a Fender Precision Bass when he was invited to live or recording sessions. Geisler's knack bass sound was a treble staccato bass guitar sound in which the bass string was plucked with a pick and immediately suppressed to cancel out any sustain.

In 1958, he recorded Happy Guitar / Samba estrella, his first solo record with the record company Telefunken. For Philips and Ariola, but mainly with Polydor, he recorded until 1965 several more solo albums, partly with the Polydor band "The Playboys". Under their label, he reached in 1961 No. 19 in the German charts with the cover of world hit Wheels. As a freelance musician, he was sought after by all the leading German record companies and worked, in some years, up to 1500 gigs. In 1988 and 1990 he went on tour in Japan, with the Alfred Hause Orchestra.

In the 1990s, he founded his own music studio, "Studio 17," and increasingly turned to jazz. He founded his own jazz band, worked together with Günter Fuhlisch and was last heard with the "same" Quintet. For several years Geisler served as Chairman of the German Composers' Association and the executive board of GEMA.

In 2008 he was featured on the Berlin Jazz Orchestra, music DVD (Polydor/Universal) Strangers in the Night – The Music of Bert Kaempfert which was eventually released in 2012 after his death. In the spring of 2010, he was shown on the liner for Helen Schneider Swing CD – a tribute to Bert Kaempfert – where he participated as bassist. In his later years, Geisler used a compact and lightweight guitar amplifier, specially selected for its sonic characteristics. With this amp, and the sound of his Gibson L-4 CES guitar, and his unique sense of rhythm and soloing, he produced his distinctive guitar sound for enthusiastic audiences at numerous live performances.

Ladi Geisler died on November 19, 2011, shortly before his 84th Birthday in Hamburg.

== Prizes and awards ==
In 2003, Geisler was awarded the Louis Armstrong Memorial Prize for Swinging Hamburg.

== Discography ==
=== Solo-Singles ===
- Happy Guitar / Samba estrella, Telefunken, 1958
- Red River Rock / Dreaming Guitar, Polydor, 1960
- Navajo / Lonely Guitar, Philips, 1961
- Auf einem persischen Markt / Immer nur lächeln (In a Persian Market / Always Just Smile), Polydor, 1961
- Amazon Paddleboat / Tomahawk, Polydor, 1962
- Guitar Tango / Zwei Gitarren, Polydor, 1962
- Little Geisha / Helena, Polydor, 1963
- Alte Kameraden / Einzug der Gladiatoren (Old Comrades / Entry of the Gladiators), Ariola, 1965

=== LPs and CDs ===
- Mr. Guitar, LP, Polydor, 1962
- Girls, Girls, Girls, LP, BASF, 1964
- Memories of Spain, LP, Ex Libris, 1968
- Guitar a la Carte Vol. 1, LP, AMG, 1968
- Guitar a la Carte Vol. 2, LP, AMG, 1969
- Guitar mit Disco 74, LP, Columbia, 1973
- Swinging Guitar, LP, Intercord, 1977
- Gitarrenträume unter Palmen (Guitar dreams under palm trees), Intercord, LP, 1978
- Classics with the guitar, LP, EMI
- Die Rock-Gitarre von Ladi Geisler (The Rock guitar Ladi Geisler), LP, Bear Family, 2000
- Minor Swing, CD, Bear Family, 2000
- Mr. Guitar, CD, BearFamily, 2000
- Those Were The Days, CD, BearFamily, 2003
- Günter Märtens trifft Ladi Geisler. Anekdoten eines Gitarrenspielers (Günter Maertens meets Ladi Geisler. Anecdotes of a guitar player), CD, Bear Family, 2007 (Audio Book)
