= Vi i femman =

Sveriges Radio and Sveriges Television quiz programme

Vi i femman (en: We in Fifth grade) is a Swedish quiz show, it has been broadcast on Sveriges Radio since 1963, and SVT since 1970. In the show fifth graders from all around Sweden competes in teams consisting of the school classes. The final rounds is broadcast on SVT.
