= Gibson EB-1 =

Electric bass guitar

- Manufacturer: Gibson Guitar Corporation
- Period: 1953–1958; 1968–1970; 1999

Construction
- Body type: Solid
- Neck joint: Set
- Scale: 30.5"

Woods
- Body: mahogany
- Neck: mahogany
- Fretboard: rosewood

Hardware
- Pickup(s): 1953 model: 1 single coil; 1970 reissue: 1 Sidewinder humbucker; 1999 Epiphone: 1 Sidewinder humbucker

Colors available
- Mahogany Brown

The Gibson EB-1 is a bass guitar that Gibson introduced in 1953. It was their first bass guitar.

== History ==
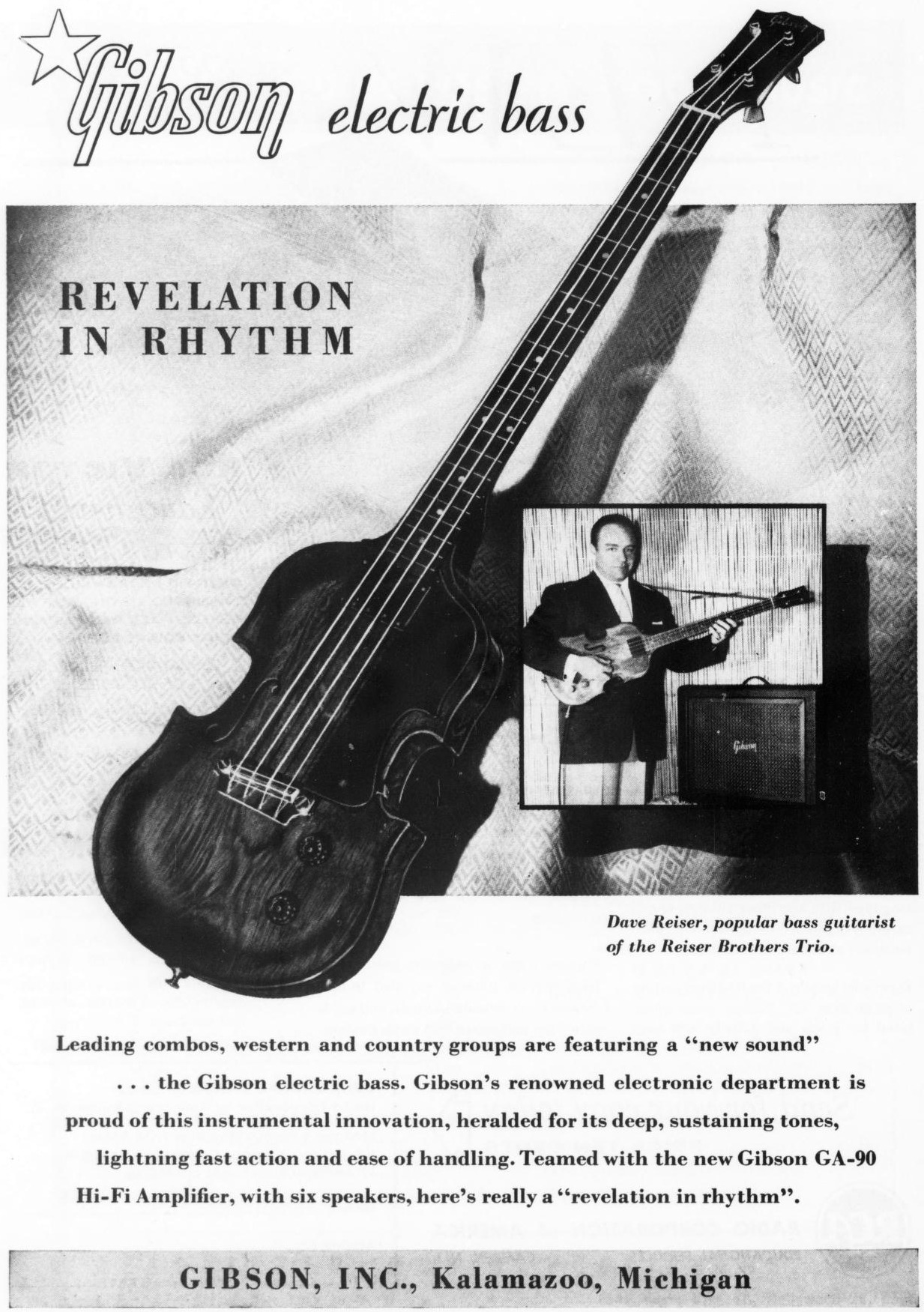
Magazine advertement (1955)

Gibson first marketed the EB-1 (initially calling it simply the Electric Bass) in 1953 in response to the success of the Fender Precision Bass. Rather than styling the body after an electric guitar, they shaped the EB-1 to resemble a double bass, even painting false f-holes on the top of the body. EB-1 production ended in 1958, when Gibson replaced it with the EB-2 and the later EB-0. They renamed the Electric Bass to the EB-1 at that time.

Gibson reissued the EB-1 in 1970 with several changes—including no false f-holes, standard right-angled tuning machines, and a chrome bridge cover. They discontinued this reissue in 1972. Epiphone (a subsidiary of Gibson) began marketing a Korean-manufactured EB-1 in 1999. This version of the EB-1 uses a bolt-on neck construction with a longer 32" scale, as well as replacing the original bridge with a more conventional three-point adjustable bass bridge.

Epiphone produces a violin-shaped bass known as the Viola Bass. However, it is not modeled after the EB-1, but the Höfner 500/1. Eastwood Guitars produces and sells their own version of the EB-1, virtually identical to the original in design.

== Design and construction ==
The EB-1 had a solid mahogany body finished with a brown stain, and a raised pickguard, which was originally colored brown to more closely match the color of the body. It had a 30.5" scale set neck—rather than the 34" scale of the Fender Precision Bass or the 41.5" scale of the 3/4-sized upright bass favored by many upright bassists of the time. To appeal to upright bass players, the EB-1 had a telescopic end pin so bassists could choose to play the EB-1 in an upright position, as well as horizontally. False f-holes and purfling on the body imitated the appearance of an upright bass.

Gibson mounted the pickup directly against the base of the neck, rather than the mid-body position of the Precision Bass, which gave the EB-1 a deeper, but less defined tone. The EB-1 had planetary banjo tuners, rather than the right-angled tuners of most other guitar and bass designs. More recent reissues have featured more conventional construction techniques, with standard issue tuning pegs and a standard bass bridge.
