= Gibson EB-0 =

Electric bass guitar

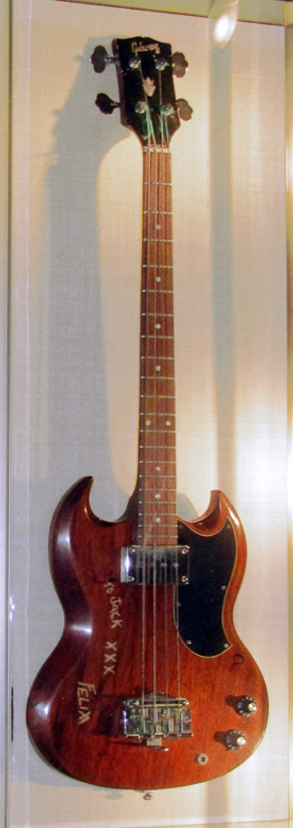
- Jack Bruce's 1967 Gibson EB-0 bass guitar
- Manufacturer: Gibson
- Period: 1959—1979

Construction
- Body type: Solid
- Neck joint: Set-in neck
- Scale: 30.5" or 34" (EB-0L)

Woods
- Body: Mahogany
- Neck: Mahogany, Maple from 1973 onwards
- Fretboard: Brazilian rosewood

Hardware
- Bridge: Fixed
- Pickup(s): 1 Sidewinder humbucker

Colors available
- Initially only Cherry Red. Walnut finish was offered starting in 1972. Black was offered between 1972 and 1975. A Natural finish was offered starting in 1973. Custom colours like Pelham Blue and Polaris White were also available on custom-order.

The Gibson EB-0 is a bass guitar that was introduced by Gibson in 1959. When production ceased in 1979, a total of 20,844 instruments had been built.

== History ==
The EB-0 was first marketed in 1959 in response to the declining sales of Gibson's EB-1. The body was styled after the design of the double-cutaway Les Paul Junior, but retained the mahogany neck and body and 30.5" scale length of the Gibson EB-1. It was available in cherry red only. This version of the EB-0 remained in production until 1961, after which the body was redesigned to resemble the Gibson SG (like the contemporary EB-3).

The design of the bass guitar changed several times during the 1960s. In 1962, the black plastic cover on the pickup was replaced by a metal one. Around 1964/5, nickel-plated hardware was replaced by chrome-plated. Around 1966/7 the neck was replaced with a thinner one; the unadjustable bar bridge was replaced by a fully adjustable one with a nylon saddle for each string. Under the bridge a lever-activated string mute system was also implemented, in contrast to Fender basses' glued on or screwed in foam mutes. This setup did not prove particularly popular, however, and was phased out in favor of Gibson's new "3-point bridge". The string guard was also removed; a bridge guard was introduced and the knobs were replaced with the witch-hat design. In 1969 and 1970, the headstock was replaced with a slotted one (similar to those on most classical guitars), with tuning keys mounted at ninety degrees downwards behind the head.

Between 1962 and 1965, Gibson produced a more expensive version called the Gibson EB-0F, which while superficially near identical, bar a longer pickguard also featured a built-in Fuzz box. This variety sold very poorly and remains fairly obscure.

The EB-0 generally came with one pickup, a large humbucker placed up close to the neck. This pickup, particularly in this configuration is known for its distinctive tone, especially its large, booming low end, owing to its unique design and exceptionally high output. This pickup, colloquially known as the "Mudbucker" for its "muddy" tone, and by Gibson itself as a "Sidewinder", as the pickup is wound from left to right side. Several aftermarket alternatives for mudbuckers have been available, some in smaller sizes. Billy Sheehan, bassist of Mr. Big, famously installed an EB-0 pickup in his Fender Precision Bass.

In 1972, the EB-0 saw another, less dramatic revision. It received a larger body, a maple neck, and its pickup was moved further from the base of the neck. Despite these revisions, sales dropped significantly in the subsequent years and production was gradually phased out. The last EB-0 was made in 1979.

Epiphone produced an EB-0 which was similar to the late '60s version of the Gibson EB-0, but with a '70s-style three-point bridge and a bolt-on neck. This version, along with the Epiphone EB-3, was discontinued in early 2020 as a part of a major reimagining of the Epiphone brand and lineup.

== Variants ==
The EB-0 fathered two variations.

- EB-0F - This was an EB-0 with a built-in passive fuzz. They were produced in limited quantities between 1962 and 1965.
- EB-0L - This was a long-scale (34") version of the EB-0. It was produced between 1970 and 1977.

== Notable EB-0 players ==
- Dennis Dunaway of Alice Cooper played a spray-painted metallic green EB-0 named "The Frog".
- Mike Watt of Minutemen and Firehose plays a heavily modified ’65 Gibson EB-0.
- Ronnie James Dio of Dio, Elf, Black Sabbath and Rainbow played a red 1961 EB-0 bass, which he used to record on several albums by Elf in the early 1970's.

== In fiction ==
The 1961 EB-0 appears in the fifth episode of the anime series FLCL, as the signature weapon of the space pirate Atomsk.
