= Starparade =

German television series (1968–1980)

- Presented by: Rainer Holbe
- Country of origin: Germany
- Original language: German
- No. of episodes: 50

Production
- Running time: 90 minutes

Original release
- Network: ZDF
- Release: 14 March 1968 – 5 June 1980

Starparade is a West German music television programme, which aired on ZDF from 14 March 1968 to 5 June 1980, and was hosted by Rainer Holbe, along with James Last and his orchestra, who began his success on the show.

== History ==
Starparade was an elaborate music show which was filmed in different venues across Germany. Each show was broadcast for approximately ninety minutes and showcased music and short interviews with the artists. The inclusion of international acts, and acts more local to Germany, reflected the international reach of the programme which would be eventually sold to various broadcasters outside of Germany. Initially, Starparade was scheduled for Saturday night, but was later moved to Thursday. The series was initially due to be filmed in colour, but the first 13 episodes were transmitted in black and white. These black and white recordings, with the exception of the first episode, have been lost and are no longer in the ZDF archive.

== Choice of music ==
Starparade, true to its name, sometimes featured foreign acts, who would usually sing multiple songs. It featured domestic stars like Heino alongside international artists such as Johnny Cash, Boney M., Neil Diamond and ABBA. Alongside this, the James Last Orchestra played instrumentals, at times even classical music. Every show also featured the official television ballet ensemble, which performed at least two dances, such that every show began with the opening music by the James Last Orchestra and a dance.

Episode 14 (30 September 1971) featured Max Greger and his orchestra.

== Special edition ==
During the 1975 International Broadcasting Exhibition, a consumer electronics fair held annually in Berlin, digital technology made it possible to exhibit the show on a wall of television screens, with each screen contributing a part to the complete picture.

== Scottish Television ==
In 1979 Scottish Television acquired the British rights to the series. STV repackaged Star Parade, removing the German compere and adding new English continuity. Each episode was sixty minutes long. They were screened from 1979 to 1985 by each of the 15 ITV companies.

== 2013 re-broadcasts ==
On 19 August 2013, the ZDFkultur channel in Germany started to re-broadcast the Starparade series and started with episode 14, featuring Max Greger instead of James Last.

== Episodes broadcast on ZDF ==
ZDF broadcast date	Episode	Guests
14 March 1968	01	Tatjana Iwanow, Nini Rosso, Ivan Rebroff
19 September 1968	02	Siw Malmkvist, Dorthe, France Gall, Peggy March, Graham Bonney
12 December 1968	03	Graham Bonney, Paola Del Medico, Rex Gildo, Heino, The Beach Boys, Marion, Salomé, Vico Torriani, Vice Vukov, Gerhard Wendland
6 March 1969	04	Roy Black, Manuela, Barry Ryan
5 May 1969	05	Salomé, Mary Roos, Edina Pop, Ricky Shayne, The Milestones, Siw Malmkvist, The Dynamite Brass, The Mike Lorrayne Singers, The Comedian Harmonics
4 September 1969	06	Antoine, Vicky Leandros, Roberto Blanco, Hubert, Renate & Werner Leismann, Peter & Alex, Wolfgang Sauer, Tonia, The Young Generation
11 December 1969	07	France Gall, Christian Anders, Gitte
5 March 1970	08	Cindy & Bert, Joe Dassin, Karel Gott, Dagmar Koller, Manuela, Edina Pop, Barry Ryan, Paul Ryan, Ambros Seelos
2 April 1970	09	Ralf Bendix, The Four Tops, Ray Miller, Rut Rex, Boris Rubashkin, Ricky Shayne, Tereza
30 April 1970	10	The Bentley Sisters, Glen Campbell, Joe Dolan, Vicky Leandros, Liesbeth List, Peggy March
18 June 1970	11	Katja Ebstein, Rex Gildo, Dieter Thomas Heck, Daliah Lavi, Rosy-Singers, Die Valendras, Gerhard Wendland
4 February 1971	12	Roy Black, Katja Ebstein, Daliah Lavi, Ike & Tina Turner
22 April 1971	13	Karel Gott, Vicky Leandros, Andy Tilman, Séverine
30 September 1971	14	Max Greger Orchestra and Starparade Ballet – Starparade; Starparade-Ballett – Singing Winds, Crying Beasts / Incident At Neshabur (by Santana); Max Greger Orchestra – Chirpy Chirpy Cheep Cheep; Die Studiker – Oak Tree; Mary Roos – California Nacht; T. Rex – Get It On; Sacha Distel – All meine heimlichen Träume; Olivia Molina – So ist Mexiko; Starparade-Ballett; Olivia Molina – Schön ist die Welt / Viva La Vita; Olivia Molina & Max Greger Orchestra – Rhythmus Show; Die Studiker – Sonne ist über die Welt; Max Greger Orchestra – Son of a Preacher Man / Love Story / Proud Mary; Starparade-Ballett – Cuban Mambo; Mary Roos – So leb dein Leben / Wir glauben an morgen; T. Rex – Hot Love; Starparade-Ballett – Rock Around The Clock; Sacha Distel – Gipsy Girl / (They Long to Be) Close to You / Raindrops Keep Fallin' on My Head; Max Greger Orchestra – Che sarà / Borriquito; Max Greger Orchestra and Starparade Ballet – Starparade; Choreography by Herbert F. Schubert
18 November 1971	15	James Last Orchestra and Starparade Ballet – Starparade; James Last Orchestra & Choir – Jamaica Farewell / Joy To The World / Hot Love; The Soulful Dynamics & Starparade Ballet – We Are Running; The Soulful Dynamics – Saah-Saah-Kumba-Kumba; James Last Orchestra – She's Too Fat For Me / Flieger-Marsch / Liechtensteiner Polka; Rex Gildo – Dame und König / Nimm meine Hand; James Last Orchestra & Choir – Mamy Blue; Manuela – Listen To Your Heart / Put Your Hand In the Hand / I Hear Those Church Bells Ringing; Titanic – Sultana; James Last Orchestra – Elvira Madigan; Anita – Papi und Mami; Roy Black – Weisst Du noch, Wo ist die Liebe?; Rex Gildo – Borriquito; Joe Dassin – Das sind zwei linke Schuh / Meines Vaters Sohn; Manuela – Prost, Onkel Albert; La Tuna – La morena de mi copla; Roy Black & Anita – Schön ist es, auf der Welt zu sein; James Last Orchestra – Pour Un Flirt / Spanish Harlem / Co-Co; Choreography by Herbert F. Schubert
13 January 1972	16	James Last Orchestra and Starparad Ballet – Starparade; James Last Orchestra – Se A Cabo; Les Humphries Singers – We Are Goin' Down Jordan; Michael Schanze – Die schönste Frage / Wer Dich sieht hat Dich lieb; Marianne Rosenberg – Er ist nicht wie du; Ballet de Paris – Gaite Parisienne (by Jacques Offenbach); Bata Illic – So leb' Dein Leben / Ein Herz steht nie still; James Last Orchestra – Santa Lucia / Paris Polka (La Seine); Jimmy Patrick – Rain / You're Finally Free; Peret – Es preferible reir que llorar / Borriquito; James Last Orchestra – Csárdás; Ballet de Paris – Oklahoma! Live (by Ray Conniff & The Singers); Chris Roberts – Hab' ich dir heute schon gesagt, dass ich dich liebe? / Ich bin so happy; Les Humphries Singers – Put Your Hand in the Hand / Che sarà / Co-Co; Alice & Ellen Kessler – Rose Di Neve / Raindrops Keep Fallin' on My Head / Hey, Mrs. Jones (by Ramsey Lewis); James Last Orchestra – Soley, Soley / Amarillo; Choreography by Peter Jackson
27 April 1972	17	James Last Orchestra and Starparade Ballet – Starparade; James Last Orchestra and Starparade Ballet – Hallo Ballett, Hallo James Last; Ulli Martin – Ich rufe dich; Séverine – Eine Herde wilder Pferde; James Last Orchestra- Hinaus in die Ferne / Der Mai ist gekommen / Das Wandern ist des Müllers Lust; Heino – Medley: Jenseits des Tales / Wir lieben die Stürme / Treue Bergvagabunden / Karamba Karacho ein Whisky / Hey Capello / In Junkers Kneipe / Mohikana Shalali; Starparade Ballet – Long Cool Woman (by The Hollies); James Last Orchestra – Swing Low, Sweet Chariot; Benny Bendorff and James Last Orchestra – Santanando; Katja Ebstein – Hinaus auf's Land; Ulli Martin – Der schönste Tag; Séverine and Starparade Ballet – Monsieur le Général; Heino – Carnaval in Rio; James Last Orchestra – Wedding Song (There Is Love) / How Do You Do; Katja Ebstein – Ich suche ein Zuhaus / Wir leben – wir lieben; Middle Of The Road – Chirpy Chirpy Cheep Cheep / Samson And Delilah / Sacramento (A Wonderful Town); Starparade Ballet – I'm Gonna Run Away from You (by Tami Lynn); Vicky Leandros – Dann kamst Du (orig. "Après toi"); Ulli Martin – Du mußt nicht weinen; Séverine – Olala L'Amour; James Last Orchestra – I'd Like To Teach The World To Sing / Beg, Steal or Borrow / Komm Gib Mir Deine Hand; choreography by Herbert F. Schubert
13 July 1972	18	James Last Orchestra and Starparade Ballet – Starparade; Karel Gott – Hol die Welt in dein Haus; Starparade Ballet – Beautiful Sunday (by James Last Orchestra); Anita – Der frechste Spatz vom Campingplatz; Ralf Bendix – Ein bißchen Licht, ein bißchen Luft, ein bißchen Sonnenschein; James Last Orchestra and Bergedorfer Kammerchor – Medley: Russian Folk Songs; Vicky Leandros – High, Joe McKenzie; Starparade Ballet – Teen Beat (by Sandy Nelson); Juliane Werding – Der letzte Kranich vom Angerburger Moor / Das ist die Freiheit, die ich meine; Karel Gott – Mistral / Wedding Samba; James Last Orchestra and Bergedorfer Kammerchor – Wenn die Elisabeth; Anita – Glück in der Tasche; James Last Orchestra and Starparade Ballet – Was machst Du mit dem Knie, lieber Hans; James Last Orchestra and Bergedorfer Kammerchor – Hallo, du süße Klingelfee / Yes! We Have No Bananas / Valencia; Ralf Bendix – Im nächsten Leben bin ich Millionär; James Last Orchestra and Starparad Ballet – Charleston / Black Bottom; Vicky Leandros – Der Zahn unserer Zeit / Ich habe die Liebe gesehen / Dann kamst du; James Last Orchestra – Sacramento / Telegram Sam / Son Of My Father / Schöne Maid; Karel Gott – Adios Goodbye; conducted by Kai Warner (instead of James Last); choreography by Herbert F. Schubert
26 October 1972	19	James Last Orchestra and Starparade Ballet – Starparade; Mouth & MacNeal – Hello-A (German version); Jürgen Marcus – Nur Liebe zählt; James Last Orchestra & Choir – Song Sung Blue / Wimoweh; Udo Jürgens – Ich bin wieder da / Mein Klavier; Roy Black – Träume in Sand und Seide; Starparade Ballet & James Last Orchestra – Blue Polka; Tony Christie – Avenues and Alleyways / A House Is Not A Home / Don't Go Down To Reno; James Last Orchestra – Adelheid / Haselnußpolka; Jürgen Marcus & Starparade Ballet – My Wife The Dancer; Jürgen Marcus – Eine neue Liebe ist wie ein neues Leben; Mouth & MacNeal – You-Kou-La-Le-Lou-Pie; Roy Black – Mein Herz ist bei dir / Ich liebe die Welt; Starparade Ballet – Popcorn (by Hot Butter); Udo Jürgens – Mayerling; James Last Orchestra – Silver Machine / Children Of The Revolution / School's Out; Udo Jürgens and James Last Orchestra – Glory Glory Halleluja / When The Saints Go Marching In; Choreography by Herbert F. Schubert
8 February 1973	20	James Last Orchestra and Starparade Ballet – Starparade; Christoph Leis-Bendorff – Was ich werden will / Bluejean Billy; James Last Orchestra – Tanz Bitte Noch Einmal Mit Mir / Jeder Hat Dich Gern, Einer Hat Dich Lieb / Dass Du Mich Liebst, Das Weiss Ich; Rex Gildo – Fiesta Mexicana; Starparade Ballet – Big Jump (by The Spotnicks); Daliah Lavi – Meine Art Liebe zu zeigen; James Last Orchestra – Delta Queen; Sandra & Andres – Alles was die Lady will / Mama Mia; Marlene Charell – Second-Hand Rose / Wer bietet mehr?; Starparade Ballet – Wer bietet mehr? (by Paul Kuhn Orchestra); James Last Orchestra – Shaft / Thunder And Lightning; Marlene Charell – Ich geh meinen Weg allein / Sexicon (from the musical “Fanny Hill”); James Last Orchestra – I'm On My Way / Michaela / Eviva España; Frank Schöbel – Nur wer das Feuer kennt; Chris Doerk – Jedes junge Mädchen wird mal geküsst; Chris Doerk and Frank Schöbel – Links von mir, rechts von mir; Starparade Ballet – The Gimmik (by The Popcorn Makers); Daliah Lavi – Wär’ ich ein Buch / Es geht auch so; Rex Gildo – Einsamkeit vergeht zu zweit / Prost, Skal, Salute; James Last Orchestra – Sing Sing Party Sing / Blau, Blau, Blau Blüht Der Enzian / Manana; Choreography by Herbert F. Schubert
22 March 1973	21	James Last Orchestra and Starparade Ballet – Starparade; Chris Roberts – Medley: Ich bin verliebt in die Liebe / Wenn Du mal einsam bist / Ein Mädchen nach Maß / Hab ich dir heute schon gesagt, dass ich dich liebe / Ich bin verliebt in die Liebe; James Last Orchestra – Trompeten Jodler; Manuela – Was hast du gemacht; Starparade Ballet – John Bubble in Trouble (by Amadeo); Cindy & Bert – Komm gib mir mehr / Immer wieder sonntags; James Last Orchestra – La Bamba / Liebe, Glück Und Sonnenschein; Julio Iglesias – Por una mujer / Du in deiner Welt / Wenn Ein Schiff Vorüberfährt (orig. "Un Canto A Galicia"); Starparade-Ballett – Mañana (by Bay City Rollers); Olivia Molina – Mexico / Ich bin wie eine Blume / So oder so; James Last Orchestra – Diary Of An Empty Day; Manuela and Herbert F. Schubert – I Want To Be Happy; Starparade-Ballett – No, No Nanette (from the musical “I Want To Be Happy"); Chris Roberts – Mein Schatz, du bist 'ne Wucht! / Eine Freude vertreibt 100 Sorgen; Manuela – Komm wieder; James Last Orchestra – Easy Livin' / Coming Closer / Hound Dog; choreography by Herbert F. Schubert
17 May 1973	22	James Last Orchestra and Starparade Ballet – Starparade; James Last Orchestra – Rum & Coca Cola / Quando Quando / South America Take It Away; Renate & Werner Leismann – Ein Schlafsack und eine Gitarre; Phil & John – Hello Mary Lou; Heino – Rote Rosen, rote Lippen, roter Wein; Renate & Werner Leismann – Mariandl; Phil & John – Marina; Starparade Ballet – Mambo No. 5(by James Last Orchestra); Ireen Sheer – Another Place, Another Time; James Last Orchestra – Ave Maria No Morro; Séverine – Tschibou, Tschiba / Ich zeig’ dir mein Paris; Starparade Ballet – Love Me Or Leave Me (by James Last Orchestra; James Last Orchestra) – Jenny, Jenny / I'm Just A Singer In A Rock'N Roll Band; Katja Ebstein – Das Lied meines Lebens / Der Stern von Mykonos; Heino – Tampico; Danyel Gérard and Starparade Ballet – Caroline; Danyel Gérard – Nur ein Zigeuner / Ich komm wieder Isabella; James Last Orchestra) – Also sprach Zarathustra / Rock Me Baby / Minirock; Ireen Sheer – Goodbye Mama; Choreography by Herbert F. Schubert
20 September 1973	23	James Last Orchestra and Starparade Ballet – Starparade; James Last Orchestra – My Sweet Gipsy Rose; Jürgen Marcus – Ich seh' den Weg vor mir; Bernd Clüver – Der Junge Mit Der Mundharmonika; Franz Lambert – Medley: Amorada / Mambo Jambo / Na Na Hey Hey Kiss Him Goodbye / Tico-Tico; Starparade Ballet – Wade In The Water (by Ramsey Lewis); James Last Orchestra – Ein Morgen Im Hamburger Hafen / Hamburg Ist Ein Schönes Städtchen / Muss I Denn / Drei Matrosen / In Portugal / Lady Of Spain; Jürgen Marcus and James Last Orchestra – Burt Bacharach's medley: I'll Never Fall in Love Again / Trains and Boats and Planes / (There's) Always Something There to Remind Me / What the World Needs Now Is Love; Irene & Co. – This Little Light of Mine / Rock Around the Clock; Mireille Mathieu – Casanova / La Paloma Ade; James Last Orchestra – Conversation (from “Trompetenkonzert” by Joseph Haydn); Oliver Onions – Flying Through The Air / Christine; Starparade Ballet –Flip-Flap (by Peter Henn); Bernd Clüver – Der kleine Prinz (Ein Engel, der Sehnsucht heißt); Jürgen Marcus – Schmetterlinge können nicht weinen; James Last Orchestra – Blockbuster / Get Down / Heart Of Stone; Mireille Mathieu – Mein letzter Tanz; Choreography by Herbert F. Schubert
20 December 1973	24	James Last Orchestra and Starparade Ballet – Starparade; James Last Orchestra – Adalita; Nina & Mike – Fahrende Musikanten; Les Humphries Singers – Kentucky Dew; Michael Schanze – Ich laß dich nie mehr aus den Augen; Irene Mann-Ballett – The Clapping Song (by Sandy Nelson); Udo Jürgens – Der Teufel hat den Schnaps gemacht; James Last Orchestra – Greensleeves / De Käpt'n, De Stüermann, De Bootsmann Un Ick / Sorrento / La Piccinina; Middle Of The Road – Bottoms Up / Music, Music / Samba D’Amour; Irene Mann-Ballett – Matrimony (arranged by James Last); Nina & Mike – Rund um die Welt geht das Lied der Liebe; James Last Orchestra – You Want To Dance / Top Of The World / Alright, Alright, Alright; Michael Schanze – Wenn der Sommer kommt / Brüderchen; Irene Mann-Ballett – Soul Makossa (by Lafayette Afro-Rock Band); Udo Jürgens – Wir müssen lernen / Das Lied, das nie zu Ende geht; Les Humphries Singers – Square Dance / Carnival; James Last Orchestra – Fröhliche Weihnacht überall / Süsser die Glocken nie klingen / Morgen, Kinder, wird's was geben / White Christmas; Irene-Mann-Ballett, choreography by Irene Mann
21 March 1974	25	James Last Orchestra and Starparade Ballet – Starparade; James Last Orchestra – Wiener Praterleben; Salvatore Adamo – Es geht eine Träne auf Reisen / Ein kleines Glück / Rosalie C’est la vie; Albert Hammond – It Never Rains in Southern California; Starparade Ballet– Punchy Plum (by Peter Henn); Chris Roberts – Du kannst nicht immer 17 sein; Mary Roos – Kleiner Clown; James Last Orchestra & Choir – MacArthur Park; Starparade Ballet – Love's Theme (by The Love Unlimited Orchestra); Truck Stop – Hello Josephine / Orange Blossom Special / Yakety Sax; Mary Roos and Starparade Ballet – Oh, Oh, Marlene; Chris Roberts – Liebe und Sonnenschein; James Last Orchestra – Exodus; Salvatore Adamo – Die alte Dame, der Sänger und die Spatzen / Aber mit dir ist meine Welt noch schön; Starparade Ballet – Prisencolinensinainciusol (by Adriano Celentano); Albert Hammond – The Free Electric Band / I'm a Train; James Last Orchestra – 48 Crash / Skweeze Me, Pleeze Me / Can the Can; Choreographie by Jonnie James
16 May 1974	26	James Last Orchestra and Starparade Ballet – Starparade; Lena Valaitis – Bonjour mon amour; James Last Orchestra – TSOP (The Sound of Philadelphia); Vicky Leandros – Wie ein Märchen; The Wombles – Remember You're A Womble / The Wombling Song; Gigliola Cinquetti – Auf der Strasse der Sonne (orig “Alle porte del sole”); Starparade Ballet – I Love You And Don't You Forget It (by Lester Lanin & His Orchestra); Costa Cordalis – Wo meine Träume sind; Mouth & MacNeal – Ah, L'Amore; James Last Orchestra – Es Wird A Wein Sein / Wien, Wien, Nur Du Allein / Mei' Mutterl War A Weanerin / Jetzt Trink'n Ma Noch A Flascherl Wein; Lena Valaitis – Wer gibt mir den Himmel zurück; Starparade Ballet – Dance With The Devil (by Cozy Powell); Mouth & MacNeal – Ein goldner Stern (orig. “Ik zie een ster"); Gigliola Cinquetti – Ja (orig “Si”); ABBA – Waterloo / Honey, Honey; James Last Orchestra – Summertime; Starparade Ballet – Maple Leaf Rag; Costa Cordalis – Steig’ in das Boot heute nacht, Anna Lena; Vicky Leandros – Theo, wir fahr'n nach Lodz / Auf Wiederseh'n, ihr Freunde mein; James Last Orchestra – Shady Lady / Du Kannst Nicht Immer Siebzehn Sein / Spaniens Gitarren; Choreography by Maria Litto und Heinz Schmiedel
19 September 1974	27	James Last Orchestra and Starparade Ballet – Starparade; Roberto Blanco – Mit Musik und Humor; Elfi Graf – Andy; James Last Orchestra – Tritsch-Tratsch-Polka; Udo Jürgens – Aber heiraten wollte er nicht; Starparade Ballet – Rich Man's Frug (from the movie „Sweet Charity“, 1969); Rex Gildo – Spanish Boulevard / Zuerst mal einen Tequila Zuerst; James Last Orchestra – Love For Sale; Michael Holm – Tränen lügen nicht; Mireille Mathieu – Trauriger Tango; Starparade Ballet – Rolling Land (by Yellow Golden); Peter Maffay – Samstag Abend in unserer Strasse; Mireille Mathieu, Michael Holm, Peter Maffay – Be-Bop-a-Lula; Roberto Blanco – Lady Laura; Elfi Graf – Ophelias Traum; James Last Orchestra – Island Of Dreams; Udo Jürgens – Es wär´so schön, die ganze Nacht bei dir zu bleiben / Zieh den Kopf aus der Schlinge, Bruder John; Starparade Ballet – The Pelican Dance (by The Baronet); Rex Gildo – Marie, der letzte Tanz ist nur für dich; James Last Orchestra – Tiger Feet / Radar Love / Jesus Loves You; Mireille Mathieu – Und der Wind wird ewig Singen; Choreography by Maria Litto and Heinz Schmiedel
5 December 1974	28	James Last Orchestra and Starparade Ballet – Starparade; Marion – Rikke-Ding, Rikke-Dong; Peter Kraus – Was dir fehlt, ist ein Mann; James Last Orchestra – Donkey Serenade / Wochenend Und Sonnenschein; Les Humphries Singers – Do You Kill Me Or Do I Kill You; Gitte – So schön kann doch kein Mann sein; Starparade Ballet – The Man In Black (by Cozy Powell); The Three Degrees – Dirty Ol’ Man / When Will I See You Again / Get Your Love Back; James Last Orchestra – Slaughter on Tenth Avenue; Reinhard Mey – Mann aus Alemannia / Über den Wolken; Starparade Ballet – Rock Your Baby (by George McCrae); Les Humphries Singers – New Orleans / Live For Today; Peter Kraus – Schöne Blumen bleiben nicht am Wege stehen; Marion – El Bimbo; Starparade Ballet – Crunchy Granola Suite (by Percy Faith & His Orchestra); Neil Diamond – Song Sung Blue / The Last Picasso; James Last Orchestra – Kung Fu Fighting / The Night Chicago Died / We're An American Band; Neil Diamond – Longfellow Serenade; Choreography by Jonnie James
6 March 1975	29	James Last Orchestra and Starparade Ballet – Starparade; Karel Gott – Heute Abend wird gefeiert; James Last Orchestra – Zigeunerwagen / Aber am abend da spielt der zigeuner / Lustig ist das zigeunerleben; Karel Gott – Er war ein zweiter Paganini; George McCrae – Rock Your Baby / I Get Lifted; Starparade Ballet – Land Of A Thousand Dances (by Percy Faith & His Orchestra); Daliah Lavi – Hevenu shalom aleichem / Sag, wenn du geh´n willst; James Last Orchestra – Auf einem persischen Markt; Sacha Distel – Accroche un ruban / Was keiner weiß; Starparade Ballet – Save Me (by Silver Convention); Nana Mouskouri – Komm, komm, sag uns deinen Traum / Sieben schwarze Rosen; James Last Orchestra – Romanze in F; Sacha Distel – Sie bleibt bei uns, die alte Dame; Starparade Ballet – Get Dancin' (by Disco-Tex and the Sex-O-Lettes); George McCrae – Sing A Happy Song; Daliah Lavi – Nichts haut mich um, aber du; Karel Gott – Rosa, Rosa; James Last Orchestra – She Loves You / A Hard Day's Night / Can't Buy Me Love; Nana Mouskouri – Adios (orig.”Soledad”); Choreography by Maria Litto and Heinz Schmiedel
5 June 1975	30	James Last Orchestra and Starparade Ballet – Starparade; James Last Orchestra – Lady Marmalade / Giddy Up / Ding-A-Dong; Dana – Spiel nicht mit mir und meinem Glück; Heino – Medley: Caramba, Caracho, ein Whisky / Mohikana Shalali / Die Sonne Von Mexico / Polenmädchen / Bergvagabunden / Schneewalzer / La Montanara / Wenn abends die Heide träumt / Hoch auf dem gelben Wagen / Blau blüht der Enzian; James Last Orchestra and Starparade Ballett – Express / Sound Your Funky Horn / Shame, Shame, Shame; Gitte Hænning – Medley: Wenn du musikalisch bist / Ich hab' die Liebe verspielt in Monte Carlo / So schön kann doch kein Mann sein /; Love Machine – Plastic Man / I've Got The Music In Me /; Jürgen Marcus – Ein Engel, der mich liebt /; Starparade Ballet – Roller Coaster (by The Disco Kid); Dana – Are You Still Mad At Me; Heino – Die schwarze Barbara; Gitte Hænning – Ich bin kein Kind von Traurigkeit; James Last Orchestra – Sorry / Only You Can; Gloria Gaynor – Never Can Say Goodbye / Reach Out I'll Be There; Jürgen Marcus – Ein Lied zieht hinaus in die Welt; James Last Orchestra – Jubilation / You Are The Sunshine Of My Life / You're The First, The Last, My Everything; Choreography by Emil Brandl
28 August 1975	31	Part 1: James Last Orchestra and Starparade Ballet – Starparade; James Last Orchestra – The Hustle; Les Humphries Singers – Day After Day; Rex Gildo – Der letzte Sirtaki; Pasadena Roof Orchestra – Pasadena; Wencke Myhre- Erst beim Tango werd´ ich richtig munter; Les Humphries Singers – California; Albert Hammond – 99 Miles from L.A./ Down By The River; James Last Orchestra – Jezebel / Bolero ’75; Vicky Leandros – Ja, ja der Peter, der ist schlau; The Manhattan Transfer – Tuxedo Junction / Blue Champagne; Mireille Mathieu – Feuer, Wasser, Luft und Erde / Der Zar und das Mädchen; Starparade Ballet – 7-6-5-4-3-2-1; Udo Jürgens – Ein neuer Morgen / ...und da hab´ ich ihr das Leben gerettet; Vicky Leandros – Ich liebe das Leben; Franz Lambert – Hummelflug; James Last Orchestra – Annie Laurie / Greensleeves; James Last Orchestra and Starparade Ballet – Starparade; Part 2: Les Humphries Singers – Family Show / Just Sit Down At The Old Piano; James Last Orchestra – Fancy Pants / Juke Box Jive; Rex Gildo – Brasil; Pasadena Roof Orchestra – Me And Jane In A Plane / Nagasaki; Wencke Myhre – Medley: Wenn du kommst, bin ich froh / Immer helter / You Are My Sunshine / Tea For Two; Manhattan Transfer – Operator / Gloria; Mireille Mathieu – Plaisir d'Amour; James Last Orchestra and Starparade Ballet – Skinny Minnie / Memphis Tennessee / Goodbye My Love; James Last Orchestra and Starparade Ballet – Starparade; Choreography by Maria Litto and Heinz Schmiedel
20 November 1975	32	James Last Orchestra and Starparade Ballet – Starparade; James Last Orchestra – American Patrol / In The Mood; Costa Cordalis – Lorelei; Bernd Clüver – Bleib doch bis zum Morgenrot; Starparade Ballet – Bongo Rock ‘73 (by Incredible Bongo Band); Michael Holm – Am Broadway; Silver Convention – Save Me / Fly, Robin, Fly; James Last Orchestra – Dolannes Melodie; Starparade Ballet – Law Of The Land (by The Temptations); 5000 Volts – Bye Love / I'm On Fire; Bernd Clüver – Ein fremdes Mädchen; Billy Swan – Don't Be Cruel / I Can't Help / Everything's The Same (Ain't Nothing Changed); Costa Cordalis – Shangri-La; Starparade Ballet – Smarty Pants (by First Choice); Penny McLean – Lady Bump; Michael Holm – Wart´auf mich (orig. “Tornero"); James Last Orchestra – Welcome To The Party / Morning Sky / Du, Sag' Einfach Du; Choreography by Maria Litto and Heinz Schmiedel
10 January 1976	33	James Last Orchestra and Starparade Ballet – Starparade; James Last Orchestra – Lady Bump / I'm On Fire / Fly, Robin, Fly; Lena Valaitis – Da kommt José, der Straßenmusikant; 20th Century Steel Band – Voices Of Spring / Heaven And Hell Is On Earth; Starparade Ballet – Rock On Brother (by The Chequers); Salvatore Adamo – So bin ich; James Last Orchestra – Granada; Freddy Quinn – Die Insel Niemandsland / El Gaucho; Starparade Ballet – Chocolate Chip (by Isaac Hayes); Jürgen Marcus – Ich bin Jürgen / Komm auf die Sonnenseite der Straße; James Last Orchestra – Im Prater blüh'n wieder die Bäume / Drunt in der Lobau / Tritsch-Tratsch-Polka; Donna Summer – Lady Of The Night / Love To Love You Baby; Salvatore Adamo – Leih’ mir eine Melodie; Starparade Ballet – Summer Of ’42 (by Biddu Orchestra); Lena Valaitis – Ein schöner Tag; Freddy Quinn – Morning Sky; James Last Orchestra – Wenn die rosen erblühen in Malaga / Ein Koffer Und Zwei Gitarren / Mein Herz, Das Ist Ein Bienenhaus; Choreography by Emil Brandl
15 May 1976	34	James Last Orchestra and Starparade Ballet – Starparade; James Last Orchestra – Pinball Wizard / 1-2-3-4... Fire! / Save Your Kisses for Me; Waterloo & Robinson – My Little World; Chocolate Menta Mastik – Komm heut' zu mir (orig. “Emor Shalom”); James Last Orchestra and Bergedorfer Kammerchor – Jetzt kommen die Lustigen Tage / Morgen Geht mein schatz auf Reisen / Freut euch des Lebens; Jürgen Drews – Ein Bett im Kornfeld; Sailor – A Glass of Champagne / Girls Girls Girls; Starparade Ballet – Tangerine (by Kai Warner Orchestra); Wencke Myhre – Sommerwind / La Felicidad; James Last Orchestra – Rodrigos Concerto; Catherine Ferry – Un, deux, trois; Starparade Ballet – Get Down Tonight (by KC & The Sunshine Band); Howard Carpendale – Ich war viel zu lange nicht in Atlanta / Fremde oder Freunde; Manhattan Transfer – That Cat Is High / Poinciana / Operator; Wencke Myhre – Das wär’ John nie passiert; James Last Orchestra – Theme from S.W.A.T.; Choreography by Maria Litto and Heinz Schmiedel
21 August 1976	35	James Last Orchestra and Starparade Ballet – Starparade; James Last Orchestra – Jalousie; Brotherhood Of Man – Kiss Me Kiss Your Baby; Karel Gott – An der Donau steht Marika; Gunter Gabriel – Oh, nur mit dir; Starparade Ballet – Dynamite Dragster (by Performance); James Last Orchestra – Wien bleibt Wien; Heino – Rot is der Wein; Julio Iglesias – Besame mi amor; Karel Gott and James Last Orchestra – Dolannes Melodie; Starparade Ballet – Fever Pitch (by Mandingo); Gunter Gabriel – Intercity Linie Nr. 4; George Baker Selection – Silver / Wildbird; Julio Iglesias – Kein Addio, kein Goodbye; James Last Orchestra – Rhapsody in Blue; Starparade Ballet – Wow (by Andre Gagnon); Karel Gott – Komm und küß mich; Heino – Marleen; Brotherhood Of Man – My Sweet Rosalie; James Last Orchestra – Queen Of Clubs / Sing It Out / Motorcycle Mama; Choreography by Gene Reed
16 October 1976	36	James Last Orchestra and Starparade Ballet – Starparade; James Last Orchestra – Radetzky-Marsch / Kärtner Lieder-Marsch; Rex Gildo – Wien ist immer noch die schönste Stadt der Welt; Bellamy Brothers – Let Your Love Flow; Mireille Mathieu – Der wein war aus Bordeaux / Es war einmal eine-liebe; Starparade Ballet – Manhunt (by Mandingo); Asha Puthli – Say Yes / The Devil Is Loose; James Last Orchestra – Hummelflug; Udo Jürgens – Der Zirkus darf nicht sterben / Aber bitte mit Sahne / Tante Emma; Starparade Ballet – Shake Your Booty (by KC and the Sunshine Band); Ritchie Family – The Best Disco in Town; Rex Gildo – König auf dieser Welt; James Last Orchestra – Zigeunerweisen; Starparade Ballet – Chariot (I Will Follow Him) (by Lafayette Street); Bellamy Brothers – Satin Sheets; Rex Gildo – Heut’ mach’ ich Hochzeit mit Marie; Mireille Mathieu – Die kleine Schwalbe; James Last Orchestra – Run Back To Mama / Don't Go Breaking My Heart / Dancing Queen; Choreography by Maria Litto and Heinz Schmiedel
10 February 1977	37	James Last Orchestra and Starparad Ballet – Starparade; James Last Orchestra – Hier ist was Los / Rosa, Rosa / Die Lustigen Holzhackerbuam; Jürgen Marcus – Mir steht das Wasser bis zum Hals; Roger Whittaker – Mexican Whistler / I Don't Believe In If Anymore / River Lady; Starparade Ballet – Ballin’ The Jack (by Camp Galore); Salvatore Adamo – Ich tanze; Guys 'n' Dolls – Don't Pull Your Love; Vicky Leandros – Kali Nichta (Gute Nacht); James Last Orchestra – Oh Susanna / Devils Dream / Shenandoah / Larry O'Gaff / Jig; Starparade Ballet – Chant: 13th Hour / Tornado (by Redbone / from original cast “The Wiz”); Roger Whittaker – Indian Lady; Franz Lambert – Medley: Dancing Queen-Fairytale-Satin Sheets / Circus Renz; Salvatore Adamo – Der Hund; James Last Orchestra – Getaway / Play That Funky Music / Heaven Is In The Back Seat Of My Cadillac; Starparade Ballet – Bionic Boogie (by Biddu Orchestra); Jürgen Marcus – Die Uhr geht vor, du kannst noch bleiben; Guys 'n' Dolls – You're My World; Vicky Leandros – Auf dem Mond da blühen keine Rosen; James Last Orchestra – Egon / Die Mädchen Aus Dem Kohlenpott / Maria-Helen; Choreography by Gene Reed
2 June 1977	38	James Last Orchestra and Starparad Ballet – Starparade; Boney M. – Daddy Cool / Sunny / Still I'm Sad; James Last Orchestra – Verliebte Muss Man Gar Nicht Erst In Stimmung Bringen / Ob Blond, Ob Braun Ich Liebe Alle Frau´n / Salome; Roy Black – Das Mädchen Carina / Du bist nicht allein / Ich denk an dich; Starparade Ballet – Supermax (by Supermax); Baccara – Cara Mia; Gitte Hænning – Glück ist nicht nur ein Wort; James Last Orchestra – Night And Day; Silver Convention – Telegram; Starparade Ballet – Nice`N`Nasty (by The Salsoul Orchestra); Mike Moran and Lynsey De Paul – Rock Bottom; Marie Myriam – L'Oiseau et l'enfant; James Last Orchestra – Don't Cry For Me Argentina; Starparade Ballet – Soul Cha Cha (by Van McCoy); Baccara – Yes Sir, I Can Boogie; Roy Black – Sand in deinen Augen; Gitte Hænning – Bye-bye, Bel Ami; Boney M. – Ma Baker; James Last Orchestra – I'm Your Boogie Man / Car Wash / Sing A Song; Choreography by Maria Litto und Heinz Schmiedel
15 September 1977	39	James Last Orchestra and Starparad Ballet – Starparade; Bellamy Brothers – Crossfire; James Last Orchestra – Theme From Rocky; Mireille Mathieu – Geh, bevor die Nacht beginnt; Starparade Ballet – "Midnite Lady" (by Cerrone); Peggy March – Fly Away, Pretty Flamingo; Gunter Gabriel – Komm Charly, fang mich Charly; James Last Orchestra – Love Me Tender / Rip It Up / Don't Be Cruel / Jailhouse Rock / Hound Dog; Caterina Valente and Starparade Ballet – Medley: Melodies From Broadway; Caterina Valente – Frutti Di Mare; Raffaella Carrà – A far l'amore comincia tu (Liebelei); Gunter Gabriel – Ich schlaf nicht gern allein ein; James Last Orchestra – Trompeten-Muckel / Trompeten Jodler; Starparade Ballet – "Love in C Minor" (by Cerrone); Bonnie Tyler – Heaven; Michael Holm – Musst du jetzt grade gehen Lucille; Mireille Mathieu – Die Liebe kennt nur der, der sie verloren hat; James Last Orchestra – Yes Sir, I Can Boogie / Sorry, I'm a Lady / Don't Leave Me This Way; Choreography by Gene Reed
10 November 1977	40	James Last Orchestra and Starparad Ballet – Starparade; Belle Epoque – Black Is Black; James Last Orchestra – Chicken Reel / Turkey In The Straw / Orange Blossom Special; Danyel Gérard – Les Temps Changent; Starparade Ballet – Love My Baby (by Sheila & B. Devotion); Howard Carpendale – Es gibt im Leben unvergessene Stunden; James Last Orchestra – Im Prater blühn wieder die Bäume / Adieu mein kleiner Gardeoffizier / Das ist der Frühling in Wien; Freddy Quinn – Der Baum des Lebens; Amanda Lear – The Lady In Black; Starparade Ballet – Don't Let Me Be Misunderstood (by Santa Esmeralda); Danyel Gérard – Mañana, Mañana, Señor; Chocolat's – La Bamba; Gheorghe Zamfir and James Last Orchestra – Einsamer Hirte; Belle Epoque – Miss Broadway; Starparade Ballet – Shorts, Shorts (by The Salsoul Orchestra); Amanda Lear – Queen Of Chinatown; Howard Carpendale – Ti Amo; Chocolat's – The Kings Of Clubs; Freddy Quinn – Freunde der Nacht; James Last Orchestra – Auf Los geht's Los / Du, sag einfach Du / 1-2-3-4... Fire!; Choreography by Maria Litto and Heinz Schmiedel
2 March 1978	41	James Last Orchestra and Starparade Ballet – Starparade; Costa Cordalis & Hitkids – Medley: Anita / It's Now Or Never / Siko Chorepse Sirtaki; James Last Orchestra & Choir – Cantar Amigos / Schwarze Estrella / Costa Brava / Eso Es El Amor; Emmylou Harris & The Hotband – (You Never Can Tell) C'est La Vie / I'll Be Your San Antone Rose; Starparade Ballet – When You Smile (by Horst Jankowski & RIAS Big Band); Peter Maffay & Johnny Tame – Josie / Making It Better; James Last Orchestra – Im Weißen Rössl Am Wolfgangssee / Es Muß Was Wunderbares Sein / Was Kann Der Sigismund Dafür, dass er so schön ist?; Wencke Myhre – Einen Mann wie Dich halt ich nicht länger aus / Jedes Lied ist einmal zu Ende / Eine Mark für Charlie; Starparade Ballet – Norwegian Wood (by Paul Kuhn & The SFB Big Band); Gilbert Becaud – L'amour c'est l'affaire des gens; James Last Orchestra & Bergedorfer Kammerchor – Russian folk songs medley: Der schöne Straßenhändler / Das Glöckchen / Trepak; Emmylou Harris – To Daddy; Costa Cordalis – Ich zeige dir das Paradies; Peter Maffay – Doreen; Wencke Myhre – Lass mein Knie Joe (orig. “It's a Heartache"); Starparade Ballet – Star Wars Theme (by Graffiti Orchestra); Kris Kristofferson – Lay Me Down (And Love The World Away); Rita Coolidge – We're All Alone; Kris Kristofferson & Rita Coolidge – Blue As I Do; James Last Orchestra – Dancin' Party / Singin' In The Rain; Choreography by Emil Brandl
11 May 1978	42	James Last Orchestra and Starparade Ballet – Starparade; La Bande à Basile – Les Chansons françaises; James Last Orchestra – Star Wars Theme; Vicky Leandros – Wer weint denn schon um einen Mann; Starparade Ballet – Singin' In The Rain (by Sheila & B. Devotion); Salvatore Adamo – Medley: Es Geht eine träne auf Reisen / Gestatten Sie, Monsieur / Komm In Mein Boot / Inch' Allah / Perlen-Silber-Gold, Madame / Die schönen Damen / Ein kleines Glück; James Last Orchestra – People Will Say We're In Love / Happy Days Are Here Again; The Carpenters – Top Of The World / Please Mr. Postman / Sweet, Sweet Smile; Starparade Ballet – I Love Paris; Ireen Sheer – Feuer; Izhar Cohen & Alphabeta – A-Ba-Ni-Bi; James Last Orchestra – Alle Vögel Sind Schon Da / Hoch Auf Dem Gelben Wagen; Salvatore Adamo – Klopfe beim Glück an die Tür; La Bande a Basile – La Chenille; Vicky Leandros- Bye Bye My Love; Starparade Ballet – Red Bullet (by Performance); ABBA – Take A Chance On Me / Eagle / Thank You For The Music; James Last Orchestra – Sing A Song / Sunny; Choreography by Gene Reed
21 September 1978	43	James Last Orchestra and Starparade Ballet – Starparade; Truck Stop – Die Frau mit dem Gurt / Ich möcht’ so gerne Dave Dudley hören; James Last Orchestra – Charmaine; Starparade Ballet – Bésame Mucho (by Viva Maria); Roger Whittaker – Medley; James Last Orchestra – Theme of Exodus; Connie Francis – Die Liebe / Lovin’ Man (orig. “Oh, Pretty Woman”) / Heut' fiel Auf Einmal Schnee (orig.”My Mother's Eyes”); Starparade Ballet – Nightflight to Venus (by Boney M.); Udo Jürgens – Wien / Superstar; James Last Orchestra & Choir – Bridge Over Troubled Water; Chris Roberts – Ich tausch den Sommer; Starparade Ballet – Too Hot For Love (by THP Orchestra); Roger Whittaker – Everybody Is Looking For An Answer; Truck Stop – Der Tramp; Cliff Richard – Lucky Lips / Please Remember Me; James Last Orchestra – Rivers Of Babylon / Night Fever / Stayin' Alive; Choreography by Gene Reed
2 November 1978	44	James Last Orchestra and Starparade Ballet – Starparade; Boney M. – Rivers Of Babylon / Brown Girl In The Ring; James Last Orchestra – Bésame Mucho; Howard Carpendale – Und das nannte er Leben; Starparade Ballet – Emperor Concerto Up To Date (by Joachim Ludwig With The Munich Machine); Nana Mouskouri – Lieder, die die Liebe schreibt; Karel Gott – Das Mädchen aus Athen; James Last Orchestra – How High The Moon; Johnny Ray – Yes Tonight, Josephine / Just Walkin’ In The Rain; Starparade Ballet – Dance Dance Dance (by The Harlettes); Howard Carpendale – Dann geh' doch; Boney M. – Mary's Boy Child; James Last Orchestra – Ballade Pour Adeline; Karel Gott – La Danza; Nana Mouskouri - Muss i' denn*; Barry Manilow – Mandy; Starparade Ballet – Bachelor Girls (by Brighouse & Rastrick Brass); Barry Manilow – Copacabana (At The Copa); James Last Orchestra – Kreuzberger Nächte / Wien Bleibt Wien / Wiener Praterleben; Choreography by Maria Litto und Heinz Schmiedel
15 March 1979	45	James Last Orchestra and Starparade Ballet – Starparade; The Ritchie Family – American Generation; James Last Orchestra – Macho Man / Y.M.C.A.; Michael Schanze – Das Kind mit dem Tambourin; Starparade Ballet – Le Freak (by Chic); Jürgen Drews – Der City-Gorilla; James Last Orchestra – Sly Mongoose / A Gay Ranchero / El Rancho Grande; Mary Roos – Männer die noch träumen; Vicky Leandros – Ich bin für dich da; Starparade Ballet – Gula Matari (by Quincy Jones); Pepe Lienhard Band – Swiss Lady / Play 'em Again; Jürgen Drews – Du schaffst mich; James Last Orchestra – The Children Of Sanchez; Michael Schanze – Das Mädchen im Spiegel; Michael Schanze, Jürgen Drews, Mary Roos, James Last – Frühlingslieder; The Ritchie Family – Feel Disco Good; John Denver – Take Me Home, Country Roads / Annie's Song; Starparade Ballet – Kitten On The Keys (by Claude Bolling); John Denver – Downhill Stuff; James Last Orchestra & Choir – Jetzt geht die Party richtig los / Und wenn dazu die Musik spielt / Tanze mit mir in den Morgen; Choreography by Emil Brandl
14 June 1979	46	James Last Orchestra and Starparade Ballet – Starparade; Boney M. – Hooray! Hooray! It's a Holi-Holiday / Ribbons Of Blue; James Last Orchestra – Root Beer Rag; Udo Jürgens – Rhodos im Regen; Udo Jürgens & James Last Orchestra – Summer Love; Starparade Ballet – Flamingo (by Leo Wright); Amanda Lear – Fashion Pack; James Last Orchestra & Choir – Music; Dschinghis Khan – Dschinghis Khan; Peter, Sue & Marc – Scotty Boy; Starparade Ballet – Greenhorn (by Cliff Carpenter & His Orchestra); Leif Garrett – Surfin' U.S.A.; James Last Orchestra – Floral Dance; Leif Garrett – Feel The Need; Dschinghis Khan – Moskau; Amanda Lear – Lili Marleen; Starparade Ballet – Café (by D.D. Sound); Udo Jürgens – Ich schrieb nie ein Lied für Karin; Boney M.- El Lute; James Last Orchestra – Stuff Like That; Choreography Gene Reed
11 October 1979	47	James Last Orchestra – Hereinspaziert / Tölzer Schützenmarsch; Renato Zero – Baratto; Milva – Zusammenleben; Starparade Ballet – Eros (by Don Ellis & Survival); Kliby with Caroline – Bauchrednernummer; James Last Orchestra & The Rolling Trinity – Long Long Ago / Jenny Jones; Mireille Mathieu – Ein romantischer Mann; Renato Zero – Triangolo; Milva – Freiheit in meiner Sprache; Starparade Ballet – Chi Mai (by Ennio Morricone); Cliff Richard – Rock 'N' Roll Juvenile; James Last Orchestra – Violinkonzert Nr.1 G-Moll (by Max Bruch); Baccara – Ay, Ay Sailor; Cliff Richard – We Don't Talk Anymore; Baccara & Die Hamburger Popspatzen – 1+1=1; Starparade Ballet – Taking It Easy (by Oliver Onions); Mireille Mathieu – Zuhause wartet Natascha; James Last Orchestra – Tiger Feet / Radar Love / Jesus Loves You; Choreography by Emil Brandl
20 December 1979	48	James Last Orchestra – Lamberts Nachtlokal; Amii Stewart – Knock On Wood; Tony Christie – What A Little Love Can Do; Demis Roussos – Romantica; James Last Orchestra – Träumerei; Nana Mouskouri – Gedanken Lesen; Starparade Ballet – Magnifique (by Charisma); Udo Jürgens – Ich weiß, was ich will / Sie ist nicht so wie du; James Last Orchestra – Heidschi Bumbeidschi / Morgen, Kinder, wird's was geben; Nana Mouskouri – Weil der Sommer ein Winter war; Starparade Ballet – High On Mad Mountain (by The Mike Theodore Orchestra); Horst Frank – Meine Zeit mit Dir; Tony Christie – Sweet September; Amii Stewart – Jealousy; Demis Roussos – Zehn Jahr und mehr; James Last Orchestra – Don't Stop 'Til You Get Enough / Rise / Pop Muzik; Nana Mouskouri – Süßer die Glocken nie klingen; Choreography by Jonnie James
7 February 1980	49	James Last Orchestra & Choir – O Signorina, Rina Rina / Am Golf Von Biscaya / Es War Ein Mädchen Und Ein Matrose; Gunter Gabriel – Rheingold -Trans-Europa; Marie Bottrell – Heaven's Just A Sin Away; Gunter Gabriel & Boxcar Willie – Ehrbares Mädchen / Goodhearted Woman; Marie Bottrell – Walk Right Back; Jürgen Marcus – Ein Lächeln; Starparade Ballet – Music Box Dancer (by Frank Mills); Howard Carpendale – Wie frei willst du sein?; James Last Orchestra – Knock On Wood; Dolly Dots – Roller Skating; Katja Ebstein – Was hat Sie? / Dann heirat' doch dein Büro; James Last Orchestra – Yosaku; Freddie Aquilar – Child; Starparade Ballet – Magic Bird Of Fire (by The Salsoul Orchestra); Dschinghis Khan – Hadschi Halef Omar; Sheila & B. Devotion – Spacer; Katja Ebstein – Abschied ist ein bißchen wie Sterben; James Last Orchestra & Choir – Hallo, Kleines Fräulein / Mäcki War Ein Seemann / In Der Nacht Ist Der Mensch Nicht Gern Alleine; Choreography by Emil Brandl
5 June 1980	50	James Last Orchestra – Fanfare For The Common Man / Judy In Disguise; Freddy Quinn – Istanbul ist weit; Rockefeller – Dolores; Starparade Ballet – Rockytrain (by Raymond Lefèvre); Leonore O'Malley – First Be A Woman; Mary Roos – Nimm deinen Fuß aus der Tür; James Last Orchestra – Boil Them Gabbage Down / Orange Blossom; Freddy Quinn – Mein Zuhause ist der Bahnhof; Starparade Ballet – Les Acadiens (by Franck Pourcel Orchestra); Goombay Dance Band – Aloha-Oe, Until We Meet Again; James Last Orchestra – The Seduction; Costa Cordalis – Pan; Gibson Brothers – Que Será Mi Vida; Starparade Ballet – Concorde (by Franck Pourcel Orchestra); Chilly – We Are The Popkings; Johnny Logan – What's Another Year; Katja Ebstein – Theater; Freddy Quinn – Du hast mein Wort; James Last Orchestra – Das Ist Berlin, Berlin / Stadt Hamburg An Der Elbe Auen / Auf Der Lüneburger Heide / Einmal Am Rhein / Rheinische Lieder, Schöne Frau'n Beim Wein / Warum Ist Es Am Rhein So Schön / Ich Hab' Mein Herz In Heidelberg Verloren / In München Steht Ein Hofbräuhaus / Glühwürmchen, Glüchwürmchen Glimm're / Das Ist Die Berliner Luft; Choreography by Herbert F. Schubert
