= Peace be upon you =

Peace be upon you may refer to:

- Shalom aleichem (Judaism)
- As-salamu alaykum (Islam)

== See also ==
- Pax (liturgy) (Christianity)
