= Olivia Molina =

Olivia Molina may refer to:

- Olivia Molina (singer) (born 1946), German-Mexican singer
- Olivia Molina (actress) (born 1980), Spanish actress
