= Hevenu shalom aleichem =

Jewish traditional folk song in Hebrew

"Hevenu shalom aleichem" (Hebrew: הבאנו שלום עליכם "We brought peace upon you") is a Hebrew-language folk song based on the greeting Shalom aleichem. While perceived to be an Israeli folk song, the melody of "Hevenu shalom aleichem" is of Hasidic origin. Some scholars have asserted that the melody originated among Hasidic Jews in Romania. It is traditionally sung at Jewish celebrations, such as weddings. It has been translated into several languages including English, French, German, and Spanish and became popular abroad, also used for peace demonstrations.

== History ==
"Hevenu shalom aleichem" is based on the traditional greeting in Hebrew, Shalom aleichem. The three words are its only text, repeated several times. The composer of the melody is unknown, however scholars assert that the tune is of Hasidic Jewish origin. While perceived to be an Israeli folk song, British music journalist Norman Lebrecht stated that the melody of "Hevenu shalom aleichem" originated among Hasidic Jews in Romania.

"Hevenu shalom aleichem" is commonly sung by Jews at wedding celebrations, and is also utilized at bar and bat mitzvah (b'nei) celebrations. While not considered a religious song, the work is occasionally incorporated in Jewish religious services; and has been cited as particularly useful in reaching congregants living with dementia because of its engagement with Jewish identity and cultural and sensory memory.

Since the early 19th century, the melody of "Hevenu shalom aleichem" has been used and adapted in several classical compositions. These include the opening of the third movement of Mendelssohn's Reformation Symphony (1830) and the last third of Franz Xaver Haberl's Salem Aleikum: Orientalisches Marsch-Intermezzo (c. 1920). The melody was later used by composer Frank Ticheli in his work Angels in the Architecture which premiered at the Sydney Opera House in 2008.

According to Israeli music scholar and Israel Prize winner Eliyahu Hacohen (b. 1935), he himself had learned the lyrics back in kindergarten. Hacohen maintained that the song's melody became known in Israel through an advertisement for Salem Aleikum cigarettes in Germany, which was performed by a Turkish ensemble.

The song has been adapted to be sung in many languages, such as English, "May there be peace in the world", German, "Wir wollen Frieden für alle" (We want peace for all), French, "Nous voulons la paix pour le monde" (We want peace for the world), and Italian, "Vogliamo pace per tutti" (We want peace for all). It became sung increasingly in Germany after the Second Vatican Council that ended in 1965, encouraging Christians and Jews to remember their common heritage. It was included in Protestant hymnals in German, including as No. 433 in the Evangelisches Gesangbuch by the 1970s. The song became popular and remains popular. In France, the French translation is also often used as a hymn.

== Music and recordings ==
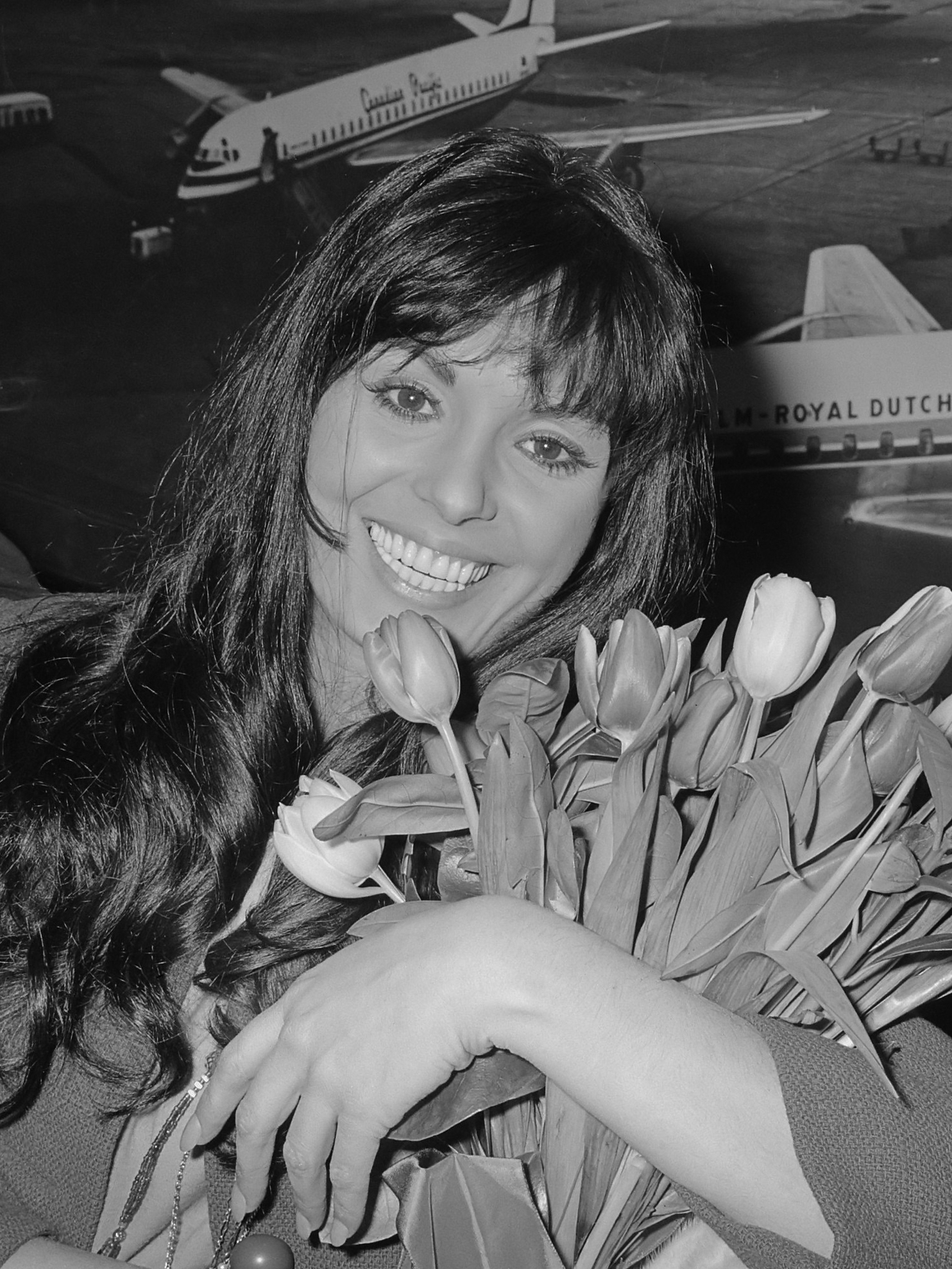
Daliah Lavi in 1966

The Israeli singer Daliah Lavi recorded the song in Germany in 1974, to open her album I'm Israeli – I'm A Sabra; it was reissued in 2022. With James Last and his orchestra, she appeared in a 1975 series of the popular Starparade. Adon Olam recorded the song in 1999 in a collection of most popular melodies from Israel. The Israel Philharmonic Orchestra included it, as part of a medley, in a collection Jewish Wedding Songs. The Rubinstein Klezmer Project released an album Fiddler on the Road in 2013, including the song.

"Hevenu shalom aleichem" is included in the Harvard Library's Judaica Sound Recordings collection.

== Uses ==
According to the Israeli newspaper Davar, the song was used to protest British rule in Mandatory Palestine (1945), to welcome Jewish refugees into the country (1946), and later as a popular children's song (1947). The work is included in both the choral and solo voice sections of the National Jewish Music Council's 1959 book Peace and Brotherhood as Reflected in Jewish Music: A Listing of Selected Works, and was listed as a song performed at concerts sponsored by that organization at Jewish community centers in the United States in the 1950s.

Upon the signing of the Camp David Accords in 1978, Israeli Prime Minister Menachem Begin referenced the song in his address to President Jimmy Carter and the citizens of Israel, stating in his concluding remarks a desire to sing "Hevenu shalom aleichem" with the people of his nation upon his return to Israel. A large grandfather clock at the Congregation Beth Israel Judaica Museum in West Hartford, Connecticut, known as the "Peace Clock", was built in 1979 in honor of the Camp David Accords and plays the tune to "Hevenu shalom aleichem" every 30 minutes.

The English-language song "Israelism", released by the Swedish group Army of Lovers in 1993, incorporates music and words from "Hevenu shalom aleichem".

In 2008 "Hevenu shalom aleichem" was included in a concert given for Pope Benedict XVI at the Park East Synagogue in New York City during his first visit to the United States. In 2018, the Jerusalem Academy of Music and Dance performed the song in Ben Gurion Airport. Choirs performed the song at a meeting with competition of European Jewish choirs in Ferrara in 2019.

The song was suggested by the German music association for choir and orchestra to be sung together with refugees from Ukraine after the Russian invasion of Ukraine, in public events with the motto Deutschland singt für Hoffnung und Frieden (Germany sings for hope and peace), inspired by President Volodymyr Zelenskyy in April 2022. It was sung in an action following the call on 3 October 2022 in Maßweiler, in an open singing with solo performers and the crowd singing together. On the anniversary of the invasion, the association called for activities on 3 October 2023, recommending to sing peace songs such as "Dona nobis pacem", "We shall overcome", "Von guten Mächten" and "Where have all the flowers gone". Holocaust survivor Tamar Dreifuss has used the song, inviting to sing it together, to concluded lectures about the Holocaust as an eye-witness in schools in Germany.
