= Werner Mang =

German businessman, plastic surgeon (born 1949)

Werner Mang MD
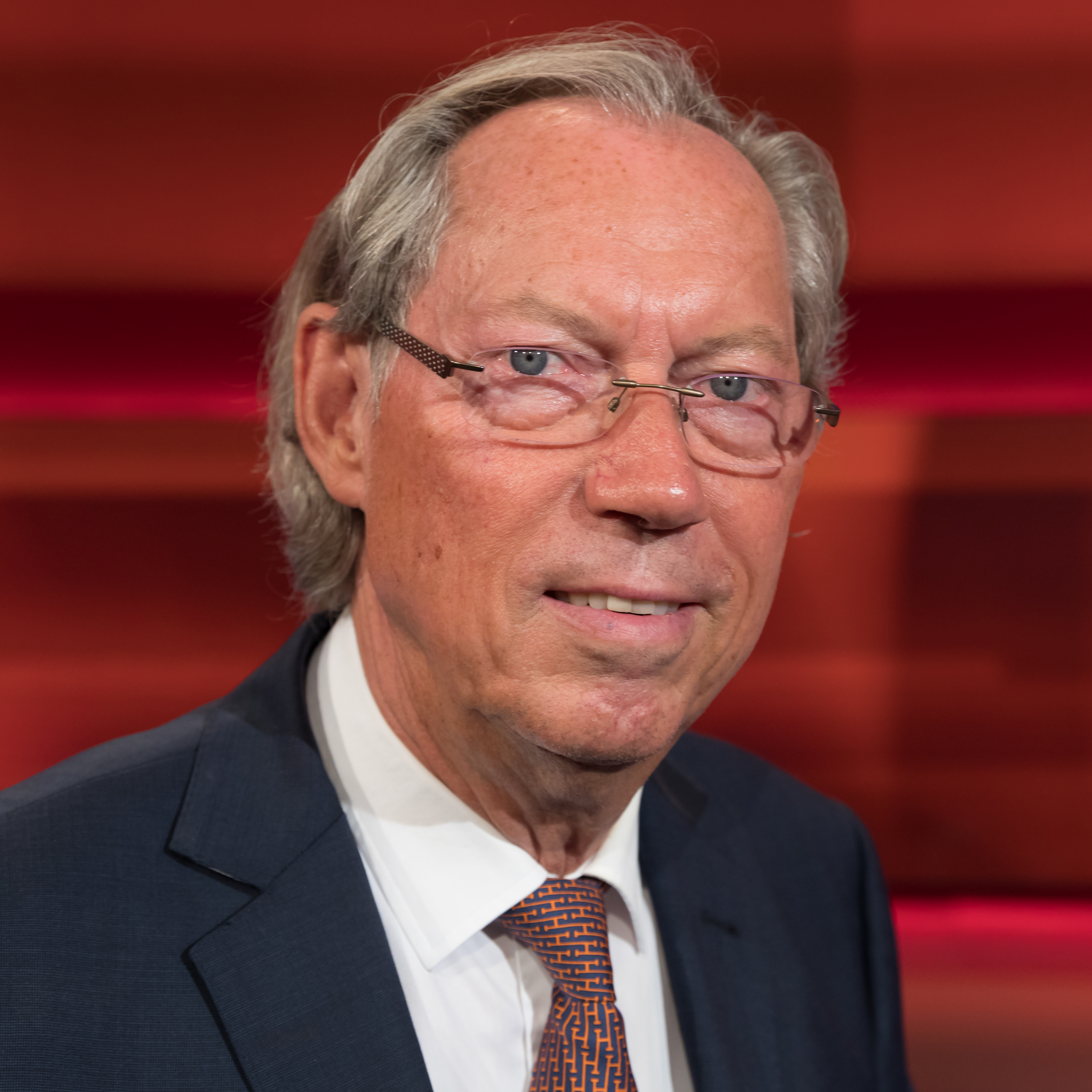
- Mang in 2019
- Born: Werner Lothar Mang; 4 September 1949 (age 76); Ulm, West Germany (now Germany)
- Citizenship: Germany; Switzerland
- Education: Bodensee-Gymnasium Lindau
- Alma mater: Technical University of Munich (MD)
- Occupations: Businessman, plastic surgeon, television personality, philanthropist
- Known for: Founding and leading Bodenseeklinik
- Spouse: Sybille Mang (m. 1985)
- Children: 2
- Website: Official website

Werner Lothar Mang (German pronunciation: [ˈvɛʁnɐ maŋ]; born 4 September 1949) is a German businessman, plastic surgeon, and television personality. He founded Bodenseeklinik, a private plastic surgery clinic in Lindau, Germany. Additionally, Mang is the chairman of the Professor Mang Foundation, which actively performs surgery on children from socially weak backgrounds. He is also known as Restorator of Lake Constance investing and reviving historic buildings and venues through Professor Mang Family Foundation.

== Life ==
Mang was born on 4 September 1949 in Ulm, West Germany, to Karl Magnus Mang, a director of forests, and Luise Mang (née Baur). His parents both originally hailed from Babenhausen and relocated to Lindau on Lake Constance in 1947. He graduated from Bodensee-Gymnasium Lindau with his Abitur in 1968.

== Awards ==
- 2003: Honorary Presidency German Society for Plastic Surgery
- 2007: Medizin-Verlag Springer, Heidelberg
- 2011: Health-Media-Award for his life achievements
- Honorary Professor in Russia
