= Su Kramer =

- Also known as: Gudrun Kramer, Gudrun "Su" Kramer,
- Born: 4 March 1946 in Oldenburg, Germany. Oldenburg, Germany
- Genre: Pop
- Occupation: Singer
- Instrument: voice
- Years active: 1960s - ?
- Labels: Telefunken, Teldec Entertainment, Heider Music Production GmbH

Su Kramer is a German singer who had success in the 1970s with singles such as "Kinder der Liebe" and "You've Got the Power".

== Background ==
Along with the Les Humphries Singers, Juergen Marcus, Udo Lindenberg, Gilbert O'Sullivan. Mac & Katie Kissoon, Tony Christie. Tom Jones. Engelbert Humperdinck, Klaus Wunderlich, Will Glahe, Hana Hegerova, Schubert Si Black, and Ulrich Roski, Kramer was one of the most popular Teldec pop artists in Germany.

One of the recording studios where Kramer recorded material was MusicLand in Munich.

== Career ==
It was reported by Billboard in the magazine's 20 November 1971 issue that Kramer along with artists such as Ilan and Ilanit, Marion, Olivia Molina, Edina Pop, Mary Roos, Sandra, Peter Horton, Teddy Parker, Adrian Wolf, Cindy & Bert, and Inga and Wolf were chosen for a special TV program to de transmitted from Berlin, on 26 February the following year.

Kramer recorded the song "Glaub' an dich selbst". Backed with " Das ist mein Land", it was released on Telefunken U 56 195 in March 1972. It made it to second place in the 1972 Eurovision.

Kramer recorded the song "Kinder der Liebe" which was backed with " Weste weiß". It was released as a single on Telefunken U 56 314 in 1973. It spent six weeks on the German charts, peaking at No. 27.

It was reported in the 26 July 1975 issue of Billboard that Kramer had formed her own group which was called The Stage.

She recorded the Christian Heilburg and Joachim Heider composition, "You've Got the Power". It made it onto the US Dance chart, peaking at No. 38 in 1976. It also made the German charts as "Hier ist das Leben" where it peaked at No. 48.

== Later years ==
In 2009, the various artists Funky Frauleins was released. Kramer's song on the album was "Die Grüne Witwe". According to Other Music, "The deepest funk may be on Su Kramer's "Die Grune Witwe," where she successfully channels Betty Davis' powerhouse grunts and squeals.

Kramer also appeared on Funky Fräuleins Vol. 2: Female Beat, Groove, Funk in Germany with "Weißer Sand". According to Forced Exposure, Kramer's voice was soulful and had a generous extended drum break to accompany it.
