= Bodenseeklinik =

Plastic surgery in Lindau, Germany

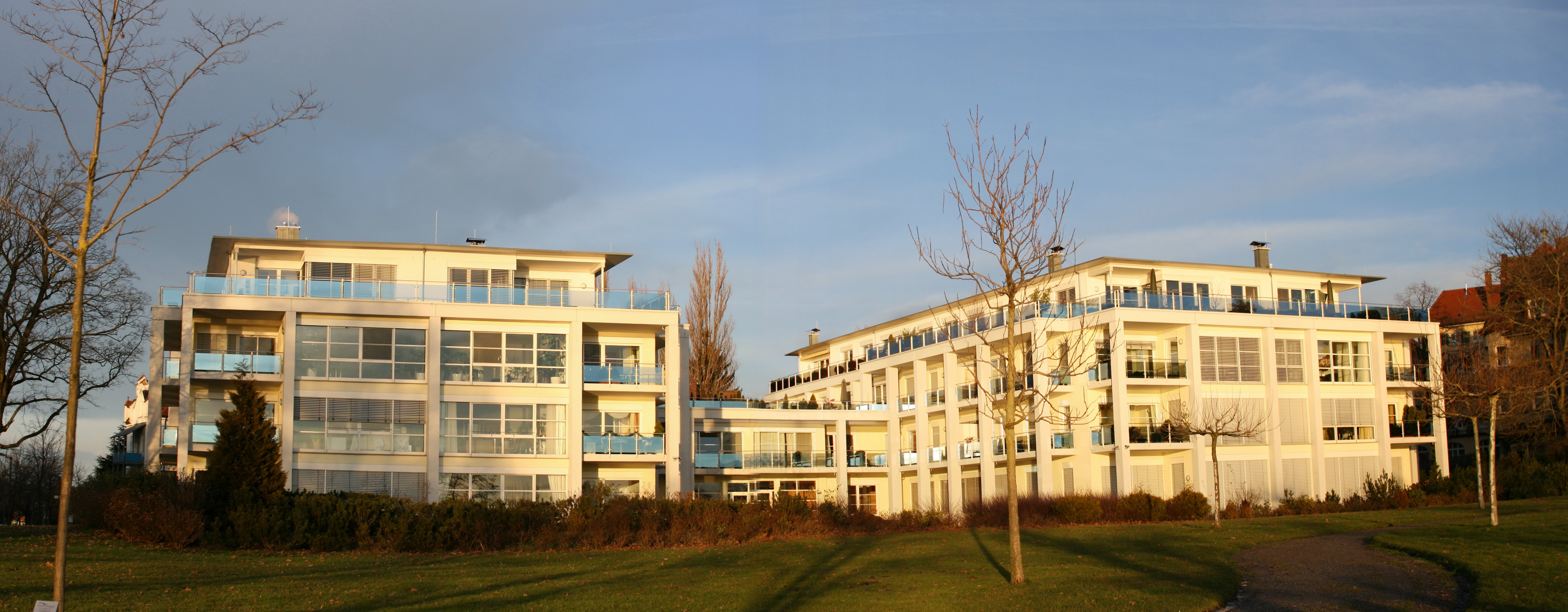
- Bodenseeklinik in Lindau, Germany

Geography
- Location: Lindau, Germany

Organisation
- Type: Private

History
- Opened: 1989

Links
- Website: bodenseeklinik.de (in German)

The Bodenseeklinik is a private clinic in Lindau, Germany. The clinic was founded by Dr. Werner Mang, who is also the medical director. Every year, approximately 2,000–3,000 plastic surgeries are performed at the Bodenseeklinik.

== History ==
In 1989, the clinic was founded by Dr. Werner Mang. Initially started as a small private clinic for plastic surgery, the clinic's capacity has grown from six to ten and later 20 beds. Ten years later, in 2000, the new hospital wing worth €25 million was built on the Western part of the small island that belongs to the city of Lindau. The new building was built directly on the shores of Lake Constance in park-like surroundings. In 2003, the building's extension was finished and opened as a private clinic which specialized in plastic and aesthetic surgery. Nowadays, the Bodenseeklinik features 50 beds on two wards, five operating rooms, one auditorium and a research lab. Currently, it is the biggest private clinic for aesthetic surgery in Europe.

== Medical principles and training facility ==
The Bodenseeklinik follows a "gentle path to beauty", and all doctors work and teach according to this principle. Mang and his team always stress the importance of preserving both health and the natural looks of the patients. The "Mang School" believes in the motto Less is more. Following this motto the director, Prof. Mang published the book a Manual of Aesthetic Surgery which features the current trend towards more gentle surgical methods. As a training hospital, the clinic features one lecture hall. From here, live videos of operations are streamed so that young doctors can watch them during their classes.

== Social Commitment ==
Medical director Werner Mang, Chairman of the Prof.-Mang-Foundation, performs surgery on children from socially weak families. In 2015, the plastic surgeon operated on the eleven-year-old boy Suresh from Nepal. Suresh was suffering from a tumor that disfigured his face and denied him to eat and talk. The family could not afford any medication or operation. With the support of his colleague, Mang reconstructed the face of the young boy in an eight-hour surgical intervention free of charge. The Bodenseeklinik also does facial reconstruction for all victims injured by the Ramstein air show disaster. There is often more than one operation needed to reconstruct the facial appearance for fire victims.

== Famous patients ==
- Marcus Schenkenberg, international model
- Costa Cordalis, German singer
- Fritz Wepper, German actor
