= As Long as There Are Pretty Girls =

1955 film directed by Arthur Maria Rabenalt

- Directed by: Arthur Maria Rabenalt
- Written by: Annemarie Artinger; Per Schwenzen; Joachim Wedekind
- Based on: Okay Mama by Annemarie Artinger
- Produced by: Klaus Stapenhorst
- Starring: Georg Thomalla; Alice Kessler; Ellen Kessler
- Cinematography: Ernst W. Kalinke
- Edited by: Margot von Schlieffen
- Music by: Allan Gray
- Production company: Carlton Film
- Distributed by: Gloria Film
- Release date: 8 July 1955
- Running time: 106 minutes
- Country: West Germany
- Language: German

As Long as There Are Pretty Girls (German: Solang' es hübsche Mädchen gibt) is a 1955 West German musical comedy film directed by Arthur Maria Rabenalt and starring Georg Thomalla, Alice Kessler and Ellen Kessler. It was based on the play Okay Mama by Annemarie Artinger. It was shot at the Bavaria Studios and Carlton Studios in Munich. The film's sets were designed by the art directors Kurt Herlth and Robert Herlth.

== Cast ==
- Georg Thomalla as Ernst
- Alice Kessler as Alice
- Ellen Kessler as Ellen
- Grethe Weiser as Erna Lerch
- Rudolf Vogel as Herr Lerch
- Irene Mann as Monika
- Oskar Sima as Colonel
- Blandine Ebinger as Frau Otto
- John W. Bubbles as Self
- Robert Cunningham as Bob

== Bibliography ==
- Bock, Hans-Michael & Bergfelder, Tim. The Concise CineGraph. Encyclopedia of German Cinema. Berghahn Books, 2009.
- Goble, Alan. The Complete Index to Literary Sources in Film. Walter de Gruyter, 1999.
