= Howard Carpendale =

South African singer

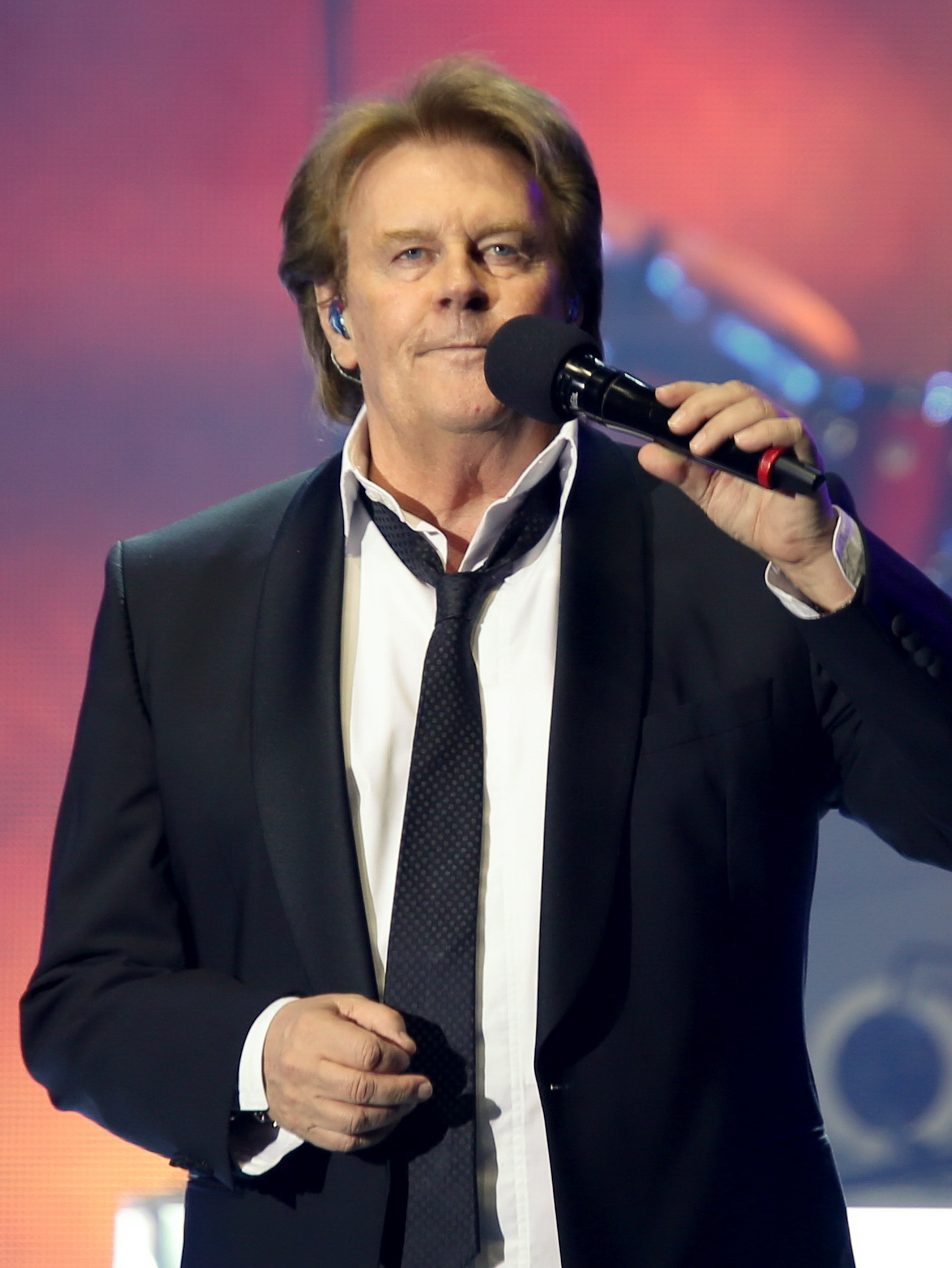
- Carpendale in 2016
- Born: Howard Victor Carpendale; 14 January 1946 (age 80); Durban, South Africa
- Occupation: Singer
- Spouses: Claudia Carpendale (m. 1976–1984); Donnice Pierce (m. 2018)
- Children: 2
- Website: www.howard-carpendale.de

Signature
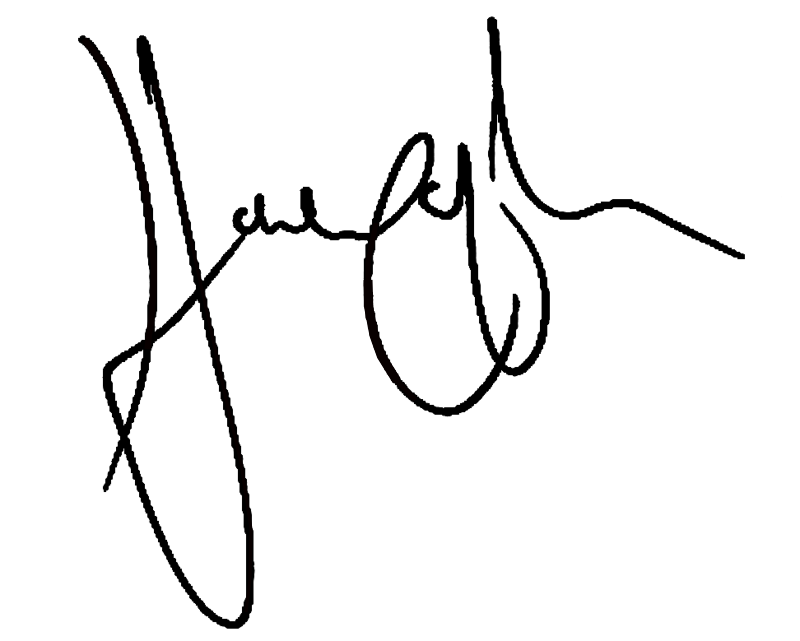

Howard Victor Carpendale (born 14 January 1946) is a South African singer living and working in Germany.

Carpendale is a pop singer who sings most of his songs in German. His 1979 song Nachts, wenn alles schläft had been among the 50 biggest-selling singles in Germany for one year. He has released 37 regular albums (live albums and compilations not included), most of which charted in the German Album Top 10.

Carpendale has two sons, Wayne Carpendale and Cass Carpendale.

== Filmography ==
- 1970: Musik, Musik – da wackelt die Penne
- 1984: No One Cries Forever
- 1992: Wiedersehen in Kanada (TV-film)
- 1994: Matchball (TV-series)
- 2012: Leb' dein Leben

== Awards ==
- 1981: Goldene Stimmgabel
- 1984: Goldene Stimmgabel
- 1986: Goldene Stimmgabel
- 1987: Goldene Stimmgabel
- 1993: Echo award in the category "Schlager/Volksmusik artist"
- 1996: Echo award in the category "Schlager/Volksmusik artist"
- 2004: Echo award for lifetime achievement

== Cover versions ==
- Living Next Door to Alice, German version
- Ti Amo, German version
