= As-salamu alaykum =

Arabic greeting

As-salamu alaykum written in the Thuluth style of Arabic calligraphy

As-salamu alaykum (Note: Arabic: ٱلسَّلَامُ عَلَيْكُمْ, romanized: as-salāmu ʿalaykum, pronounced [as.sa.laː.mu ʕa.laj.kum] lit. 'Peace be upon you', also written salamun alaykum and salam alaykum) is an Arabic-origin greeting. Its response is wa-ʿalaykumu s-salām. (Note: وَعَلَيْكُمُ ٱلسَّلَامُ [wa.ʕa.laj.ku.mu‿s.sa.laːm], lit. 'and peace be upon you') It is a Muslim religious salutation, though its use predates Islam and is common among non-Muslim speakers of Arabic or Arabic-influenced languages. In colloquial speech, the shortened form salām (Note: سَلَام, lit. 'peace') is often used to greet a person in Arabic and other languages. The phrase can be expanded to as-salāmu ʿalaykum wa-raḥmatu -llāhi wa-barakātuhᵘ̄ (Note: ٱلسَّلَامُ عَلَيْكُمْ وَرَحْمَةُ ٱللَّٰهِ وَبَرَكَاتُهُ [as.sa.laː.mu ʕa.laj.kum wa.raħ.ma.tu‿ɫ.ɫaː.hi wa.ba.ra.kaː.tu.hu], lit. 'Peace be upon you, as well as the mercy of God and His blessings').

The use of salām as an Arabic greeting dates at least to Laqit bin Yamar al-Ayadi (6th century), and cognates in older Semitic languages—Aramaic šlāmā ʿalḵōn (ܫܠܵܡܵܐ ܥܲܠܟ݂ܘܿܢ) and Hebrew shalom aleichem (שָׁלוֹם עֲלֵיכֶם shālôm ʻalêḵem)—can be traced back to the Old Testament period. In the Quranic period, one repeated as-salamu alaykum, but the inverted response is attested in Arabic not long after its appearance in Hebrew.

== Grammatical variants ==
The expression commonly uses the second person plural masculine, even when used to address one person and non-males. It may be modified by choosing the appropriate enclitic pronoun.

| Gender | Greeting (Note: According to the standard pronunciation rules of Classical Arabic, the last short vowel in each word is not pronounced in pausa.) | Response |
|---|---|---|
| Singular; Masculine | ٱلسَّلَامُ عَلَيْكَ | وَعَلَيْكَ ٱلسَّلَامُ |
| Singular; Masculine | [as.sa.laː.mu ʕa.laj.ka] | [wa.ʕa.laj.ka‿s.sa.laː.mu] |
| Singular; Masculine | as-salāmu ʿalaykᵃ | wa ʿalayka s-salāmᵘ |
| Singular; Feminine | ٱلسَّلَامُ عَلَيْكِ | وَعَلَيْكِ ٱلسَّلَامُ |
| Singular; Feminine | [as.sa.laː.mu ʕa.laj.ki] | [wa.ʕa.laj.ki‿s.sa.laː.mu] |
| Singular; Feminine | as-salāmu ʿalaykⁱ | wa ʿalayki s-salāmᵘ |
| Dual; Unisex | ٱلسَّلَامُ عَلَيْكُمَا | وَعَلَيْكُمَا ٱلسَّلَامُ |
| Dual; Unisex | [as.sa.laː.mu ʕa.laj.ku.maː] | [wa.ʕa.laj.ku.maː‿s.sa.laː.mu] |
| Dual; Unisex | as-salāmu ʿalaykumā | wa ʿalaykumā s-salāmᵘ |
| Plural; Masculine | ٱلسَّلَامُ عَلَيْكُمْ | وَعَلَيْكُمُ ٱلسَّلَامُ |
| Plural; Masculine | [as.sa.laː.mu ʕa.laj.kum] | [wa.ʕa.laj.ku.mu‿s.sa.laː.mu] |
| Plural; Masculine | as-salāmu ʿalaykum | wa ʿalaykumu s-salāmᵘ |
| Plural; Feminine | ٱلسَّلَامُ عَلَيْكُنَّ | وَعَلَيْكُنَّ ٱلسَّلَامُ |
| Plural; Feminine | [as.sa.laː.mu ʕa.laj.kun.na] | [wa.ʕa.laj.kun.na‿s.sa.laː.mu] |
| Plural; Feminine | as-salāmu ʿalaykunnᵃ | wa ʿalaykunna s-salāmᵘ |

A third-person variant, ʿalayhi as-salām, lit. 'peace be upon him', is often used by Muslims for prophets and other holy personalities, such as angels.

== In Islam ==
According to Islamic tradition, the origin of the greeting "Peace be upon you" dates back to the first human, Adam:

As recorded in Sahih Muslim and Sahih al-Bukhari, Abu Huraira reported: 'The Prophet, peace and blessings be upon him, said, "Allah said: Go and greet with peace these groups of assembled angels and listen to how they greet you, for this will be the greeting among your progeny. Adam said: Peace be upon you. The angels said: Peace be upon you and the mercy of Allah. Thus, they added the mercy of Allah."

The final Prophet said, "None of you will enter paradise until you believe and you will not believe until you love one another. Shall I not tell you about something which, if you do it, you will love one another? Spread salām amongst yourselves."'

It is also stated that one should give the Salam greeting upon entering a house. This is based upon a verse of the Quran:

فَإِذَا دَخَلْتُم بُيُوتًۭا فَسَلِّمُوا۟ عَلَىٰٓ أَنفُسِكُمْ تَحِيَّةًۭ مِّنْ عِندِ ٱللَّهِ مُبَـٰرَكَةًۭ طَيِّبَةًۭ ۚ كَذَٰلِكَ يُبَيِّنُ ٱللَّهُ لَكُمُ ٱلْـَٔايَـٰتِ لَعَلَّكُمْ تَعْقِلُونَ ۝
"However, when you enter houses, greet one another with a greeting ˹of peace˺ from Allah, blessed and good. This is how Allah makes His revelations clear to you, so perhaps you will understand."

— Surah An-Nur, Ayah 61

The phrase appears a total of 7 times in the Quran, each time as salāmun ʿalaykum (Arabic: سَلَامٌ عَلَيْكُمْ). In Classical Arabic, used in the Qur'an and early Hadith manuscripts, the phrase is spelled as "ٱلسَّلَٰمُ عَلَيْكُمْ وَرَحْمَتُ ٱللَّٰهِ وَبَرَكَٰتُهُ". In Rasm, it is written as "السلم علىکم ورحمٮ ال‍له وٮرکٮه".

وَإِذَا جَاءَكَ الَّذِينَ يُؤْمِنُونَ بِآيَاتِنَا فَقُلْ سَلَامٌ عَلَيْكُمْ كَتَبَ رَبُّكُمْ عَلَىٰ نَفْسِهِ الرَّحْمَةَ أَنَّهُ مَنْ عَمِلَ مِنكُمْ سُوءًا بِجَهَالَةٍ ثُمَّ تَابَ مِن بَعْدِهِ .وَأَصْلَحَ فَأَنَّهُ غَفُورٌ رَّحِيمٌ ۝
"When those who have faith in Our signs come to you, say, 'Peace to you! Your Lord has made mercy incumbent upon Himself: whoever of you commits an evil ˹deed˺ out of ignorance and then repents after that and reforms, then He is indeed All-Forgiving, All-Merciful.'"

— Surah Al-An'am (6), Ayah 54

وَبَيْنَهُمَا حِجَابٌ وَعَلَى الْأَعْرَافِ رِجَالٌ يَعْرِفُونَ كُلًّا بِسِيمَاهُمْ وَنَادَوْا أَصْحَابَ الْجَنَّةِ أَن سَلَامٌ عَلَيْكُمْ لَمْ يَدْخُلُوهَا وَهُمْ يَطْمَعُونَ ۝
"And there will be a veil between them. And on the Elevations will be certain men who recognize each of them by their mark. They will call out to the inhabitants of paradise, 'Peace be to you!' They will not have entered it, though they would be eager to do so."

— Surah Al-A'raf (7), Ayah 46

سَلَامٌ عَلَيْكُم بِمَا صَبَرْتُمْ ۚ فَنِعْمَ عُقْبَى ٱلدَّارِ
"'Peace be to you, for your patience.' How excellent is the reward of the ˹ultimate˺ abode!"

— Surah Ar-Ra'd (13), Ayah 24

الَّذِينَ تَتَوَفَّاهُمُ الْمَلَائِكَةُ طَيِّبِينَ ۙ يَقُولُونَ سَلَامٌ عَلَيْكُمُ ادْخُلُوا الْجَنَّةَ بِمَا كُنتُمْ تَعْمَلُون ۝
"Those whom the angels take away while they are pure. They say ˹to them˺, 'Peace be to you! Enter paradise because of what you used to do.'"

— Surah An-Nahl (16), Ayah 32

قَالَ سَلَامٌ عَلَيْكَ سَأَسْتَغْفِرُ لَكَ رَبِّي إِنَّهُ كَانَ بِي حَفِيًّا ۝
"He said, 'Peace be to you! I shall plead with my Lord to forgive you. Indeed He is gracious to me.'"

— Surah Maryam (19), Ayah 47

وَإِذَا سَمِعُوا اللَّغْوَ أَعْرَضُوا عَنْهُ وَقَالُوا لَنَا أَعْمَالُنَا وَلَكُمْ أَعْمَالُكُمْ سَلَامٌ عَلَيْكُمْ لَا نَبْتَغِي الْجَاهِلِينَ ۝
"And when they hear vain talk, they avoid it and say, 'Our deeds belong to us, and your deeds belong to you. Peace be to you. We do not court the ignorant.'"

— Surah Al-Qasas (28), Ayah 55

وَسِيقَ ٱلَّذِينَ ٱتَّقَوْا۟ رَبَّهُمْ إِلَى ٱلْجَنَّةِ زُمَرًا ۖ حَتَّىٰ إِذَا جَآءُوهَا وَفُتِحَتْ أَبْوَابُهَا وَقَالَ لَهُمْ خَزَنَتُهَا سَلَامٌ عَلَيْكُمْ طِبْتُمْ فَٱدْخُلُوهَا خَالِدِينَ
"Those who are wary of their Lord will be led to paradise in throngs. When they reach it, and its gates are opened, its keepers will say to them, 'Peace be to you! You are welcome! Enter it to remain ˹forever˺.'"

— Surah Az-Zumar (39), Ayah 73

Other variants, such as salamun ʿalā (سَلَامٌ عَلَىٰ), or the term salam (سَلَام) alone is also mentioned in several other Ayahs of the Qur'an.

== Usage by non-Arabic speakers ==
- Cognate Semitic language parallels include the Aramaic/Classical Syriac šlāmā ʿalḵōn (ܫܠܵܡܵܐ ܥܲܠܟ݂ܘܿܢ), and the Hebrew Shalom aleichem (שָׁלוֹם עֲלֵיכֶם shālôm ʻalêḵem).
  - Maltese inherited is-sliem għalikom from Arabic.
- In Albania and Kosovo a diminutive form in the Albanian language, Selamun Alejkem or Selamun Alejqum, is rarely used, the 'q' being a voiceless palatal stop typical of Balkan Turkish and Thracian Turkish phonology.
- In Bangladesh, Assalamu alaikum (Bengali: আসসালামু আলাইকুম) is the most common Muslim greeting. Some Muslims greet their elders with these words whilst raising their right hand to the forehead.
- The older generation of South Asian Christians in the northern Indian subcontinent speak Hindustani and use the word salám when greeting one another.

== See also ==
- Adhan
- Dhikr
- Pax vobiscum
- Peace be upon him
- Š-L-M
- Salawat
- Shahadah
- Tashahhud
