= Truck Stop (band) =

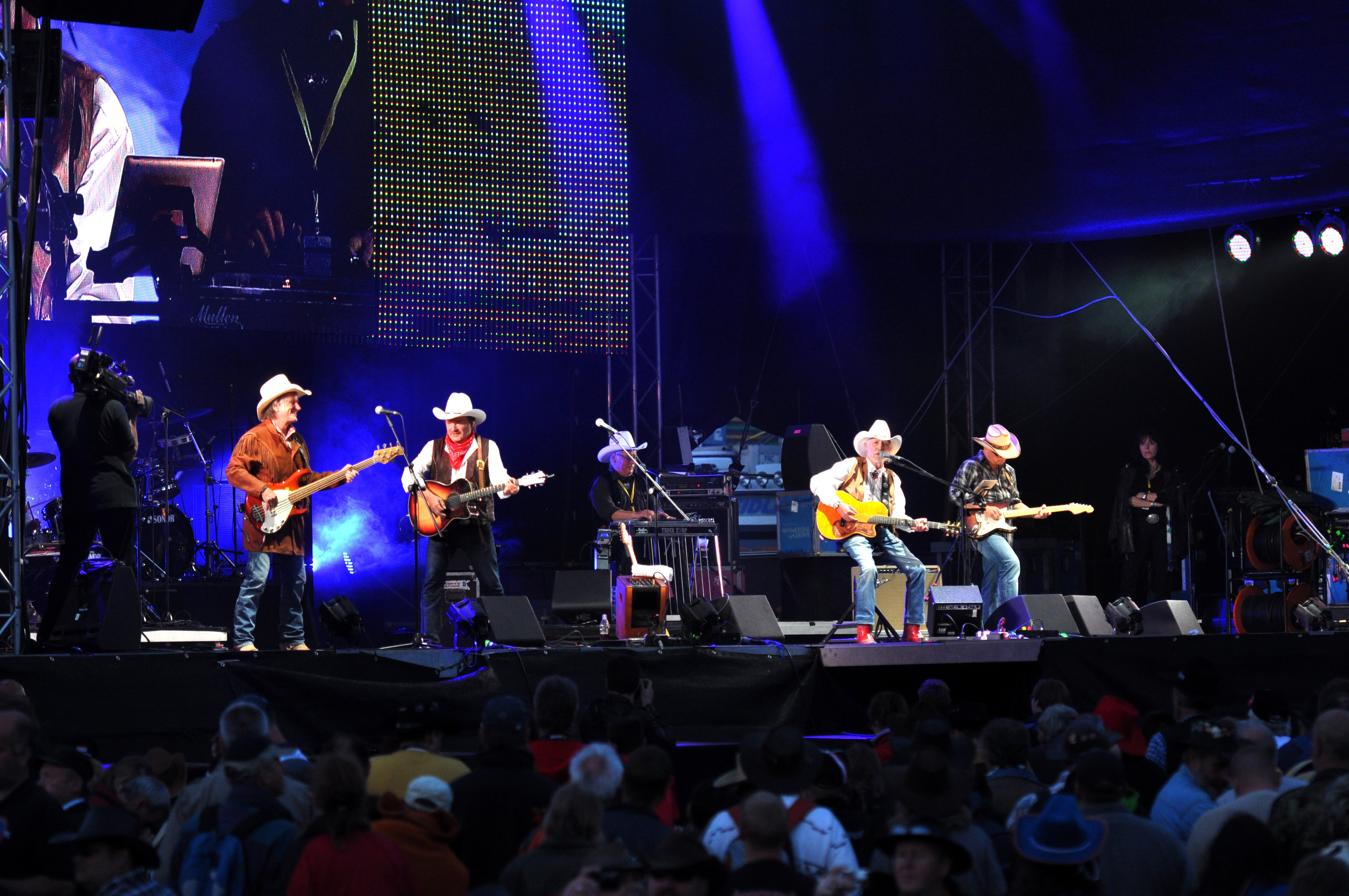
- Truck Stop at the International Truck Grand Prix Country Festival 2013, Nürburgring, Germany

Background information
- Origin: Germany
- Genres: Country
- Years active: 1973–present
- Members: Teddy Ibing; Uwe Frenzel; Knut Bewersdorff; David Rick; Andreas Cisek; Tim Reese
- Past members: Rainer Bach; Cisco Berndt; Lucius Reichling; Erich Doll; Eckart Hofmann; Rudolf Steinmetz; Uwe Lost; Chris Kaufmann; Dirk Schlag
- Website: http://truck-stop.de

Truck Stop is a German country band from Seevetal-Maschen, Harburg, south of Hamburg, formed in 1973.

== History ==
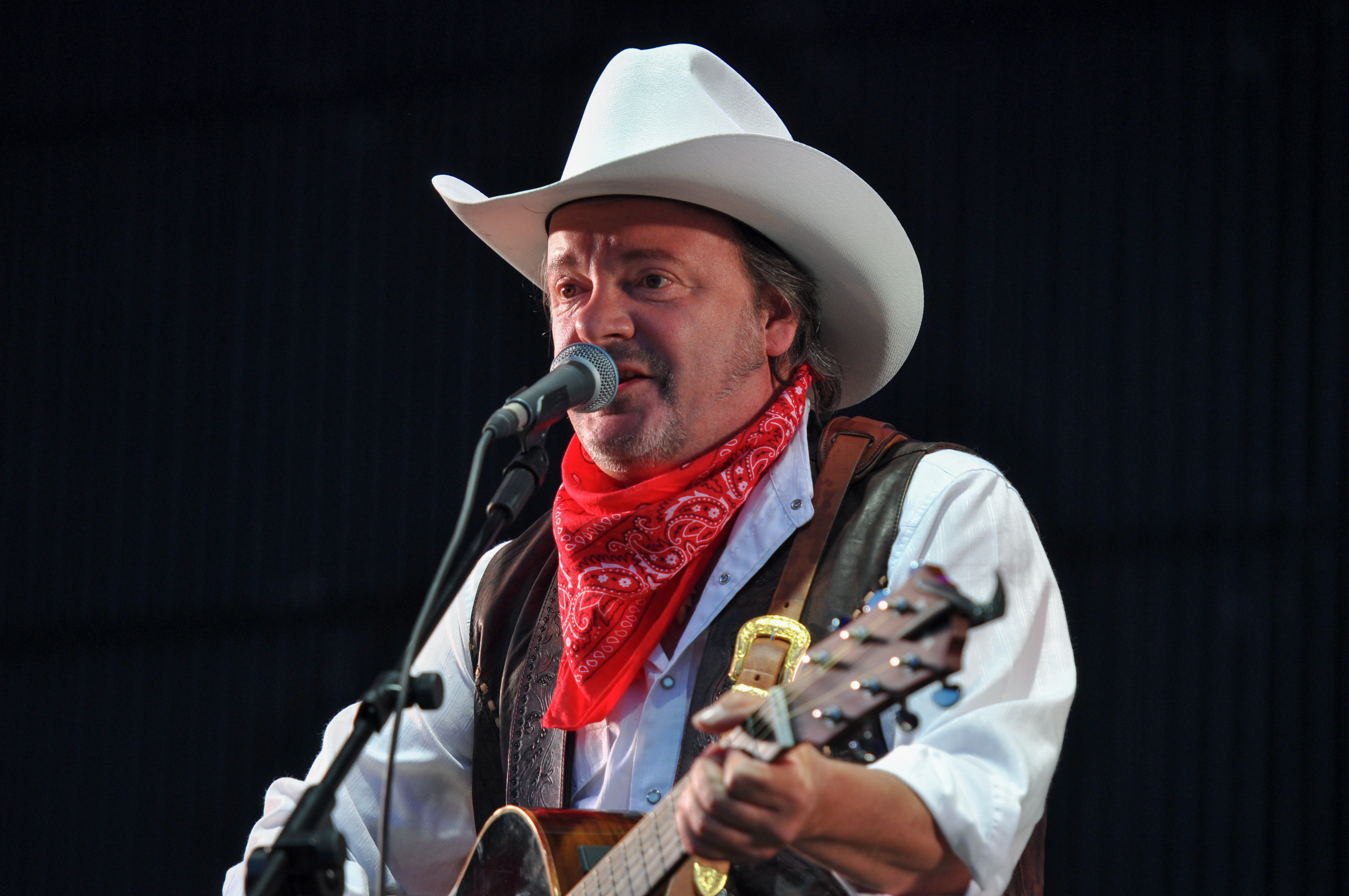
Andreas Cisek of Truck Stop at the International Truck Grand Prix Country Festival 2013, Nürburgring, Germany

Originally singing in English, the band switched to German in 1977 with its album Zuhause (Home), which sold 150,000 copies. From this album, the single "Die Frau mit dem Gurt" reached number 27 on the German hit parade. Another song on the album, "Ich möchte so gern Dave Dudley hör’n" ("I Would Like So Much to Hear Dave Dudley"), reached number nine on the German single hit parade in April 1978. The band earned number one placement with the singles "Der wilde, wilde Westen" and "Old Texas Town" in 1980 and 1981.

During their existence, the band has released 40 albums, as well as anniversary compilations and dozens of singles.
