= Costa Cordalis =

Greek-German singer (1944–2019)

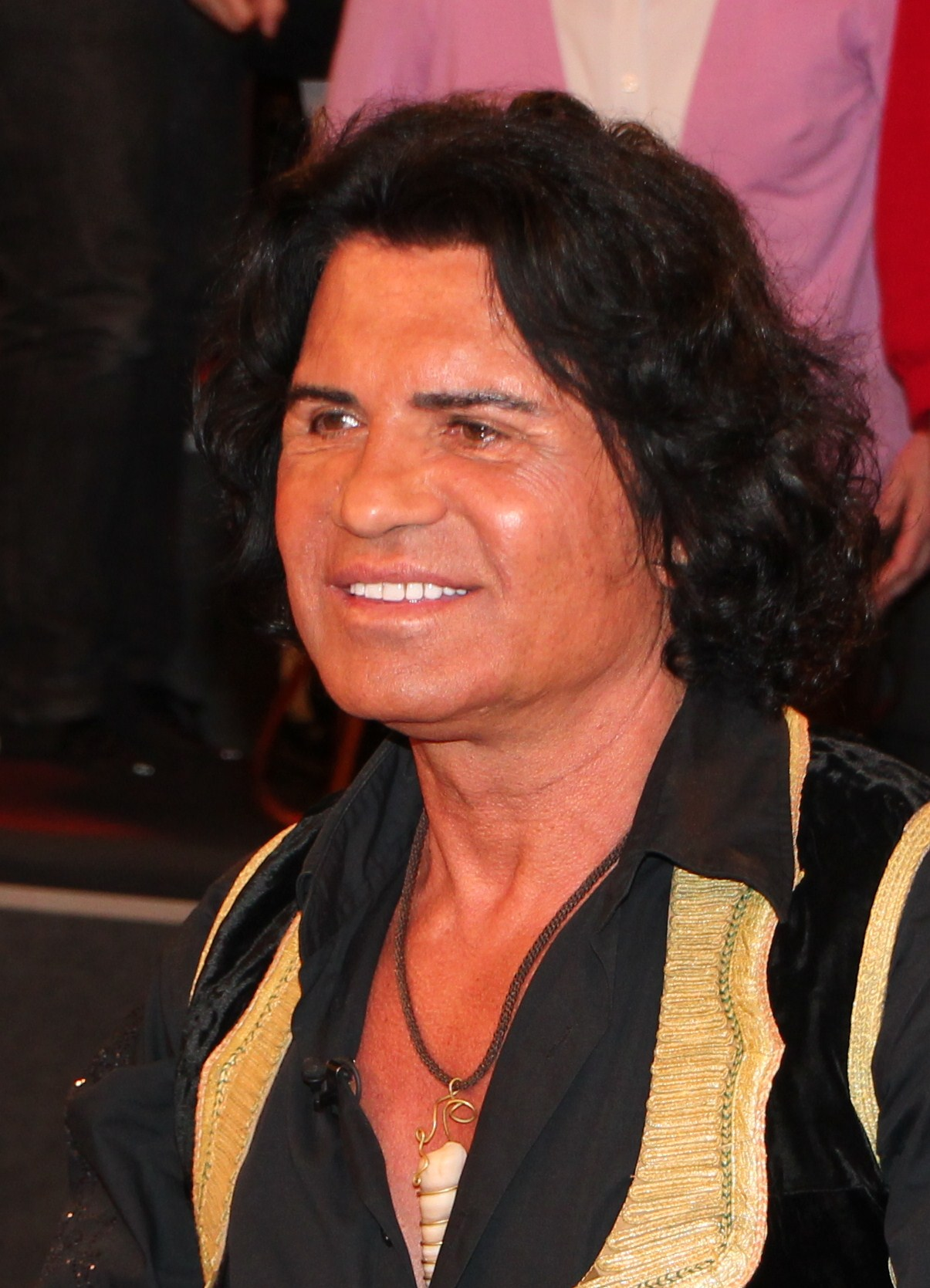
- Cordalis in 2011

Background information
- Born: Konstantinos Cordalis; 1 May 1944; Elateia, Phthiotis, Greece
- Died: 2 July 2019 (aged 75) Santa Ponça, Mallorca, Spain
- Genres: Schlager
- Occupation: Singer
- Years active: 1965–2019
- Website: cordalis.com

Costa Cordalis (Greek: Κώστας Κορδαλής; born Konstantinos Cordalis; 1 May 1944 – 2 July 2019) was a Greek-German Schlager singer.

== Biography ==
Born Konstantinos Cordalis in Elateia, Phthiotis, Cordalis moved to Germany in 1960. His 1976 song "Anita" reached the top ten in Germany, Switzerland and Austria. In 2004, he took part in, and won, the reality television game show Ich bin ein Star – Holt mich hier raus!. In the same year, he admitted that he had a facelift in the Bodenseeklinik because he wanted to look younger. Cordalis competed for Greece in the FIS Nordic World Ski Championships 1985.

He had a son, Lucas, and two daughters, Kiki and Eva.

== Awards ==
- 1981: Goldene Stimmgabel
- 1986: Goldene Stimmgabel
