= Shalom aleichem =

Traditional Jewish Hebrew-language greeting

Shalom aleichem (/ʃəˌlɒm əˈleɪxəm, ˌʃoʊləm-/; Hebrew: שָׁלוֹם עֲלֵיכֶם šālōm ʿalēḵem [ʃaˈloːm ʕaleːˈxem], lit. 'peace be upon you') is a greeting in the Hebrew language. When someone is greeted with these words, the appropriate response is aleichem shalom (עֲלֵיכֶם שָׁלוֹם, lit. 'unto you peace'). The term aleichem is plural, but is still used when addressing one person.

This form of greeting is traditional among Jews worldwide, and typically connotes a religious context. It is particularly common among Ashkenazi Jews.

== History ==
Biblical figures greet each other with šālōm lǝkā (šālōm to you, m. singular) or šālōm lākem (plural).

The term šālōm ʿālēkā (masculine singular) is first attested in the Scroll of Blessings for the First Month (before 30 BCE), a Dead Sea Scroll, where it is spelled, in their manner, with a final he.

The plural šālōm ʿălēkem first appears in the Jerusalem Talmud (c. 400 CE), always with a plural object. It occurs there six times and the response is to repeat šālōm ʿălēkem. According to y. Sheviit 4:3, it was specifically a Jewish greeting at this time.

Šālōm ʿālēkā appears many times in the Talmud Bavli (c. 500 CE) and Leviticus Rabbah (contested date), where the response is to repeat šālōm ʿālēkā.

The inverted response ʿālēkā šālōm (masculine singular) is first attested in the Midrash Abba Gorion (before 1050 CE), in the gloss on Esther 3:5:

"What did Haman do when he passed by and Mordechai did not rise to greet him? (Note: lit. 'Ask after his šālōm.') He came from one side and made as if Mordechai had greeted him, (Note: lit. asked after his šālōm) saying 'ʿālēkā šālōm,' but Mordechai replied, 'the LORD says there is no šālōm for the wicked.'" — Isaiah 48:22

The plural greeting and response became common among Ashkenazi Jews in the second half of the next millennium, as the use of plural forms to denote respect was imported from French and German.

In most communities, one says Shalom aleichem to three people who respond Aleichem shalom as part of the Kiddush levana ritual.

== In other languages ==
Many other Semitic languages (the language family to which Hebrew belongs), as well as some Indo-European languages, share cognates to this greeting.

=== Semitic languages ===
Among Arabs, the variation as-salāmuʿalaikum (Arabic: ٱلسَّلَامُ عَلَيْكُم, lit. 'peace be upon you') has been a traditional greeting since before the rise of Islam with the appropriate response wa ʿalaykumu s-salām (وَعَلَيْكُمُ ٱلسَّلَام, lit. 'and unto you peace') first attested by Fakhr al-Din al-Razi. Following the early Muslim conquests in the 7th century, it was established as a prevalent greeting among many non-Arab Muslims.

In Classical Syriac, the term shlama 'allāwkhon (ܫܠܡܐ ܥܠܘܟ݂ܘܢ, lit. 'peace on you') is prevalent.

=== Indo-European languages ===
Similar greetings gained prominence with the rise of European Christianity. Within the Catholic Church and the Eastern Orthodox Church, bishops and priests initially use the liturgical greeting "peace be with you" (Greek: Εἰρήνη ὑμῖν; Latin: Pax vobiscum) during divine services. During the Mass, Catholic priests who are not bishops say "the Lord be with you" (Dóminus vobíscum), with "and with your spirit" being the appropriate response. Bishops and priests also use the somewhat similar greeting "the peace of the Lord be with you always" during the Mass. In the Orthodox Church, the greeting is always "peace be with you" during services.

Similarly, "peace be with you" is used within Anglicanism, particularly within the liturgies of the Episcopal Church and others in the Anglican Communion, with the "and also with you" being the appropriate response. In the liturgy of the Lutheran Church, the greeting by the pastor is "the peace of Christ be with you always" followed by "and also with you" as the congregation's response. Others, such as the Presbyterian Church and the Church of the Brethren, have similar traditional greetings.

== Jewish songs ==
The greeting inspired the traditional folk song Hevenu Shalom Aleichem, which was eventually translated to many languages and became popular in peace demonstrations abroad.

== See also ==
- Shalom, the Hebrew greeting for "peace"
- As-salamu alaykum, the Arabic greeting
- Sholem Aleichem, a Jewish author and playwright
