= Irene Mann =

German dancer, actress and choreographer (1929–1996)

- Born: 19 April 1929; Königsberg, East Prussia, Germany
- Died: 19 September 1996 (aged 67); Pfaffenhofen an der Ilm, Bavaria, Germany
- Occupations: Dancer, Actress, Choreographer
- Years active: 1952 - 1985 (film & TV)

Irene Mann (1929–1996) was a German dancer, actress and choreographer.

== Selected filmography ==
- The Last Waltz (1953)
- As Long as There Are Pretty Girls (1955)
- That Won't Keep a Sailor Down (1958)
- Marina (1960)
- Our Crazy Nieces (1963)

== Bibliography ==
- Robert Ignatius Letellier. Operetta: A Sourcebook, Volume II, Volume 2. Cambridge Scholars Publishing, 2015.
