= Olivia Molina (singer) =

German-Mexican singer (born 1946)

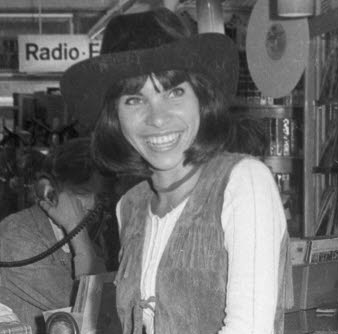
Molina in 1970

Olivia Molina (born January 3, 1946) is a German-Mexican singer.

Born in Copenhagen, Olivia Molina grew up in Mexico. Her mother was a German dancer, born in Flensburg, her father a musician and bandleader, born in San Cristobal, Chiapas, Mexico. Olivia Molina started her career as a singer in Acapulco, Mexico, at the age of fourteen. When still in school, she scored her earliest success in hits by Paul Anka, Ricky Nelson and Brenda Lee. Olivia Molina sang in clubs and hotels, and was awarded her first recording contract by the Peerless record company in Mexico City when still a teenager.

== Career ==
It was reported by Billboard in the magazine's 20 November 1971 issue that Molina along with artists such as Su Kramer, Ilan and Ilanit, Marion, Edina Pop, Mary Roos, Sandra, Peter Horton, Teddy Parker, Adrian Wolf, Cindy & Bert, and Inga and Wolf were chosen for a special TV program to de transmitted from Berlin, on 26 February the following year.

It was reported in the 17 May 1975 issue of Billboard that Molina was the star of the Bad Hersfelder Festival which was scheduled for 8 July.
