= Mariana Preda =

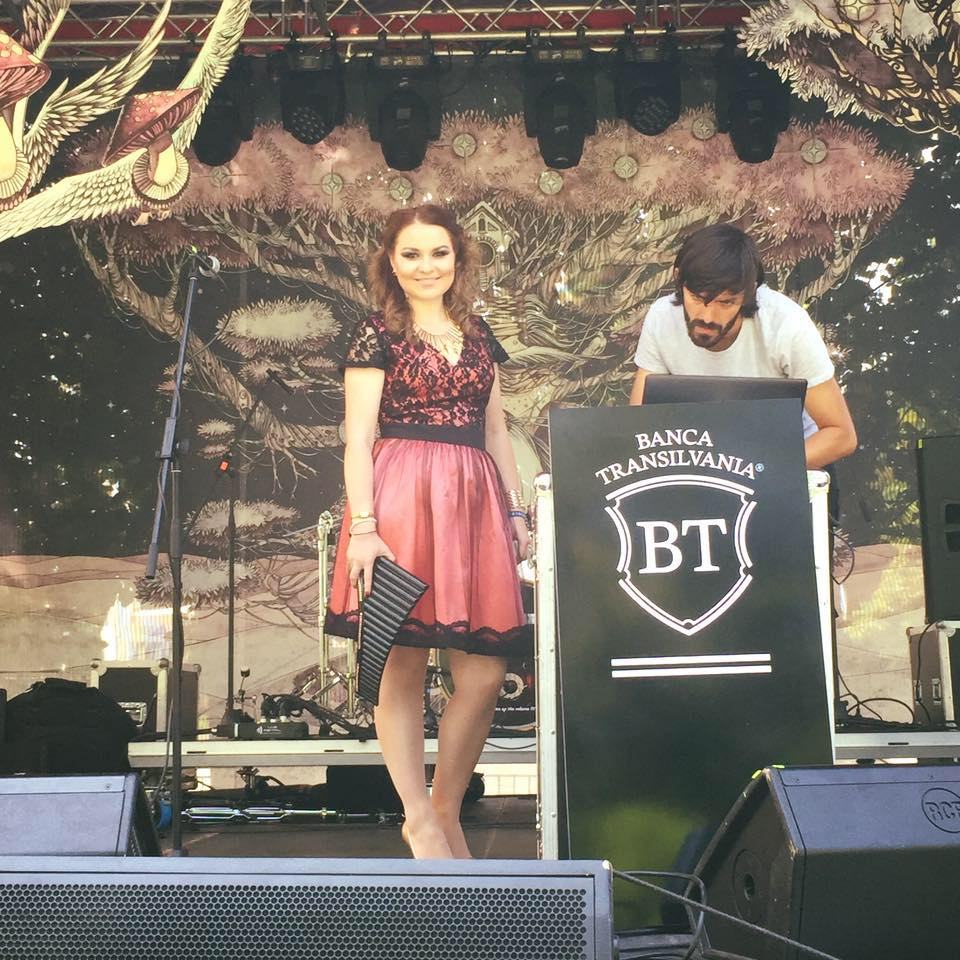
- Born: 23 January 1994 (age 32); Dragodana, Dâmbovița County, Romania
- Occupations: musician; actress; film director
- Years active: 2010–present
- Musical career
- Genres: Romanian popular music Instrumental Pop; Easy listening
- Instruments: Pan Flute, Vocals
- Labels: MAP (Musicisti Associati Produzioni) - Milan, Italy
- Website: www.marianapreda.com

Mariana Preda (born 23 January 1994) is a Romanian pan flute musician, actress and film director. She came into prominence after starring in the multi awarded short film Doina. As a musician, she is known for her album Sunrise published by the label MAP in Italy in 2013 and for having many concerts around the world.

== Early life ==
Mariana Preda was born in 1994 and raised in Dragodana, Romania. She studied music at the 'Balasa Doamna High School in Târgoviște and in 2013 she moved to Amsterdam to continue her studies at the Conservatorium van Amsterdam in classical and contemporary music. Among her teachers were Gheorghe Zamfir, Damian Drăghici, and Matthijs Koene. She is a native Romanian speaker and is fluent in English and French.

== Career ==
=== 2010-2011 ===
In 2010, Mariana played the main role in a short film called Doina directed by Italian filmmaker Nikolas Grasso. She played along renown Romanian actresses such as Maria Dinulescu and Carmen Ungureanu. For her performance, she received two awards: Best Actress at the Monaco International Film Festival in 2010 and Best Actress at the Festival du Cinema de Paris in 2011.

=== 2014 ===
In 2014, Mariana directed her first short film named "Life". The short won the Independent Spirit Award at the Monaco International Film Festival in December 2014. Life was also screened in New York at the Long Island International Film Expo.

=== 2015 ===
On Monday 23 March 2015 she performed in a show named "Clipe de Viață" at the National Theatre of Bucharest along with famous Romanian actors and performers such as Maria Dinulescu, Ion Caramitru, Felicia Filip, Maia Morgenstern and many others. Mariana performed at the first edition of the Untold Festival, the largest electronic music festival held in Romania, taking place in Cluj-Napoca.

During the summer she performed twice at Expo in Milan

In November Dutch composer Merlijn Twaalfhoven chose Mariana as ambassador for Romania for the opening song performed at the Amsterdam Light Festival.

=== 2016 ===
On 7 January 2016 at the LSRS Gala which took place at the Palace of the Parliament, Mariana was given a special recognition for being one of the best Romanian students abroad in the field of the arts.

On March 18, the Ambassador of Romania in Belgium hosted, at his Residence, a literary evening celebrating the International Francophonie Day. The literary event, moderated by Jacques De Decker benefited of the musical intermezzos of Mariana Preda.

On 1 April, Mariana performed in London at St. Martin in the Fields together with organist Donald MacKenzie. This was the very first pan flute concert organized at this venue.

On 15 May, Mariana Preda performed at the 'Romania Day on Broadway' in New York. The occasion drew together the almost 200,000 Romanian-Americans living in New York City.

On 28 May, Mariana opened the concert of the renowned Romanian musician Tudor Gheorghe at St. Martin's Cathedral in Utrecht.

On 6 July, Mariana held the very first pan flute concert in Havana at San Francisco de Paula's Church, an event organized by the Romanian Embassy and Ambassador Dumitru Preda.

On 7 August, Mariana performed at the second edition of Untold Festival for the second time.

On 24 September, Mariana opened the Film Exhibition "Romanian cinematographic landmarks in the diaspora" with a pan flute performance at 'La Casa del Cinema' in Rome, Italy, prior to the projection of her short films 'Doina' and 'Life'.

On 2 December, Mariana Preda has been invited to perform in the Preston Bradley Hall of the Chicago Cultural Center together with Romanian Cimbalom player Nicolae Feraru, pianist Gerard Cademcian and singer Laura Bretan for the Romanian National Day organized by the Romanian consulate and H.E. Consul Mihaela Deaconu.

=== 2017 ===
On 10 April, Mariana performed at an event organised by the Romanian Embassy in The Hague in the presence of H.E. Bert Koenders, the Dutch Minister of Foreign Affairs at that time.

On 3 August, Mariana played for the third time at Untold Festival in Cluj Napoca.

On 27 August Mariana Preda held a concert with Japanese pianist Daisuke Kanamaru at Muziekgebouw aan ‘t IJ for the 40th Edition of the Uitmarkt, one of the most important cultural events in The Netherlands.

On 8 September Mariana performed a lunch concert for the Gaudeamus Muziekweek in Tivoli Theatre, Utrecht, The Netherlands.

On 16 September Mariana performed at the Romanian Days in De Rijp.

On 7 and 8 October, Mariana Preda played at 'Be Romanian for A Day' Festival in Los Angeles, California.

On 27 October she was invited at "Vorbeste Lumea", a Romanian TV Show on Pro TV.

On 17 November, her new album "The Untold Story" was released as a tribute to the Untold Festival where she performed three times since its beginning.

In 2017 Mariana Preda performed at three official events for the Romanian National Day.:

On 29 November, Mariana was officially invited by the Romanian Embassy in Copenhagen, Denmark, to open the celebration of the Romanian National Day with a recital in the presence of Romanian actor Florin Piersic.

On 4 December, she performed in Turin during the day at Teatro Valdocco.

On the same day, she performed for the Romanian Consulate in Milan in the presence of the Ambassador of Romania in Italy, H.E. George Gabriel Bologan, opening her performance by performing on her panflute the national anthem of Italy, followed by the one of Romania.

=== 2018 ===
On 6 January, she performed a lunch concert with Japanese pianist Daisuke Kanamaru at OBA Cinetol in Amsterdam.

On 15 February Mariana Preda performed for the opening of the photo exposition "Romanian and the Great War" in the presence of Willibrord van Beek, the King's commissioner of Utrecht and of Romania's Ambassador H.E. Brandusa Predescu, at the museum Huis Doorn.

She got in the semi-finals of Romania's Got Talent after a great performance during her first audition. Romanian actor Florin Călinescu said "You are the Jimi Hendrix of the Pan Flute" while Romanian musician Andra said "I don't think I've ever heard anyone play like you do".

=== 2019 ===
She received the Béla Bartók Award by the IBLA Foundation

On 4 May she received the Honorary Citizenship of the city of Jacksonville by Mayor Bob Johnson

On 7 May she debuted at Carnegie Hall in New York City
