= Non Stop Dancing 65 =

Non Stop Dancing '65

Studio album by James Last
- Released: 1965
- Recorded: 1965
- Genre: Jazz
- Length: 44:48
- Label: Polydor
- Producer: James Last

James Last chronology
Die gab's nur einmal (1965)	Non Stop Dancing '65 (1965)	Hammond a Gogo (1966)

Professional ratings
Review scores
Source	Rating
Allmusic	link

Non Stop Dancing '65 is a 1965 album by the James Last Band, conducted and arranged by James Last, engineered by Peter Klemt, recorded at Polydor studios in Hamburg, Germany.

This album was the first in a series of about 30 Non Stop Dancing albums. The final official entry of the series was in 1984, although Last continued to make a few similar albums (Für alle, 1985; Dance, Dance, Dance, 1988; New Party Classics, 2002).

== Track listing ==
From the 1965 Polydor release no. 237.447

1. "Don't Ha Ha" (The Governors)
2. "Shake Hands" (Drafi Deutscher)
3. "Can't Buy Me Love" (The Beatles)
4. "Skinny Minnie" (Tony Sheridan)
5. "Do Wah Diddy, Diddy" (Manfred Mann)
6. "Clap Hands" (James Last)
7. "Pretty Woman" (Roy Orbison)
8. "Das ist die Frage aller Fragen" (Cliff Richard)
9. "Eight Days a Week" (The Beatles)
10. "Kiddy, Kiddy, Kiss Me" (Rita Pavone + Paul Anka)
11. "Good Bye, Good Bye, Good Bye" (Peggy March)
12. "My Boy Lollipop" (Millie)
13. "Zwei Mädchen aus Germany" (Paul Anka)
14. "Tennessee Waltz" (Alma Cogan)
15. "Memphis Tennessee" (Dave Clark Five)
16. "A Hard Day's Night" (The Beatles)
17. "I Feel Fine" (The Beatles)
18. "No Reply" (The Beatles)
19. "Kiss and Shake" (Renate Kern)
20. "Downtown" (Petula Clark)
21. "Cinderella Baby" (Drafi Deutscher)
22. "Wer kann das schon?" (Peter Beil)
23. "Das war mein schönster Tanz" (Bernd Spier)
24. "Rag Doll" (Four Seasons)
25. "Melancholie" (Die Bambis)
26. "I Want to Hold Your Hand" (The Beatles)
27. "Sie liebt dich" (The Beatles)
28. "I Should Have Known Better" (The Beatles)

== Personnel ==
- Manfred Moch - Trumpet
- Detlef Surmann - Trombone
- Jo Ment - Sax
- Willi Surmann - Sax
- Bernd Steffanowski - Guitar
- Heinz Schulze - Guitar
- Fritz (Fiete) Wacker - Bass
- Robert Last - Drums
- Günter Platzek - Piano & Organ
- James Last - Arranger, Conductor
