= Doina (film) =

- Directed by: Nikolas Grasso
- Screenplay by: Nikolas Grasso; Alessandra Cabassi; Carolina Taddei
- Produced by: Dan Lupu
- Starring: Mariana Preda; Maria Dinulescu; Mircea Galis
- Cinematography: Daniel Serbanica
- Edited by: Didier Tommasi
- Music by: Gheorghe Zamfir
- Release date: 2010
- Running time: 17 minutes
- Country: Romania
- Language: Romanian

Doina is a 2010 Romanian short musical drama film written & directed by Italian filmmaker Nikolas Grasso, starring Mariana Preda, Maria Dinulescu, Mircea Galis and Carmen Ungureanu. Doina has been awarded by 9 International Film Festivals.

== Plot ==
A talented teenager named Doina is training for an important international piano selection, but the piano is not her real passion and soon she has to choose whether to follow the path everyone else has planned for her or seek her own.

== Release ==
The film had its World Premiere at the Monaco International Film Festival on December 2, 2010, and subsequently screened at multiple film festivals around the world, including the Gasparilla Film Festival, one of Tampa Bay's largest independent film festivals, and the Phoenix Film Festival, the largest attended festival in Arizona.

== Recognition ==
=== Critical reception ===
The selection of Doina by the GIFF was covered by the Tampa Tribune. Film critic Walt Belcher stated "Among the international films is Doina, an award-winning effort by 23-year-old Italian filmmaker Nikolas Grasso. It's about a 16-year-old girl training for a piano competition." James Stanford of The Coast stated, "As an international short, the music is the theme and primary subject for a film that begs you to open your shell and follow the rhythm of your own tune. Rest assured, this had audiences cheering."

=== Awards and nominations ===
- 2010, Mariana Preda won Best Actress Award at the Monaco International Film Festival
- 2011, Mariana Preda won Best Actress Award at the Festival du Cinéma de Paris
- 2011, won Best Short Film Award at the Chicago International Movies and Music Festival
- 2011, won Audience Award at the National Film Festival for Talented Youth
- 2011, won Best Short Film Award at the Fiaticorti Short Film Festival
- 2012, won Best Soundtrack at the Inventa un Film International Film Festival
- 2014, won Audience Award at the Corti d'Essay Film Festival
- 2014, won Best Screenplay at the Delhi Shorts International Film Festival
- 2016, won Golden Palm Award at the Mexico International Film Festival
