= Boboci =

Boboci may refer to several villages in Romania:

- Boboci, a village in Dragodana Commune, Dâmboviţa County
- Boboci, a village in Jugureni Commune, Prahova County
