= Bob Lanese =

American trumpet player (1941–2024)

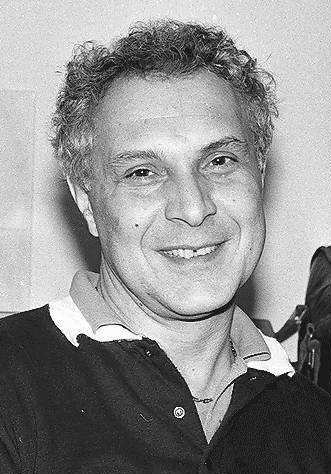
Bob Lanese (1989)

Bob Lanese (August 2, 1941 – April 9, 2024) was an American trumpet player who spent most of his career as a professional musician in Germany.

== Life and career ==
Born and raised in Cleveland, Ohio, Lanese was one of a group of local trumpet players who would eventually play in the James Last Orchestra in Germany, the others being Rick Kiefer, Bob Findley and Chuck Findley. He earned a bachelor's degree in Science and Music Education at Ohio State University in 1962, and then became a member of the house band for the Alpine Village, a popular nightclub in Cleveland. During the Vietnam War, he played with the Norad Commanders, a renowned American air defense big band. After his discharge, he became a graduate assistant in jazz at North Texas State University. In 1971, he toured Europe with the Glenn Miller Orchestra under the direction of Buddy DeFranco and became particularly enamored with the German port city of Hamburg. Soon after, he landed a job with the NDR (Norddeutsche Rundfunk, or North German Radio) big band in Hamburg. During his tenure at NDR, he began to work occasional sessions for the James Last Orchestra and eventually joined the band in 1972. For the next 30 years, he became primarily known as the lead trumpeter for the Last band, but also played many sessions for other German bandleaders like Kai Warner, Jo Ment, Frank Valdor, Max Greger and Bert Kaempfert. Lanese made solo recordings for the Europa record label and also directed his own group, the Downtown Big Band. In addition, he worked as a music educator and clinician throughout Germany. He retired from the James Last Orchestra in 2002, but continued to play and teach. Lanese died on April 9, 2024, at the age of 82.
