= Leif Uvemark =

Swedish trumpeter and conductor

Leif Uvemark (1939–1996) was a Swedish trumpeter and conductor of Leif Uvemark Bigband. Born in Malmö in 1939, he played in the NDR Bigband in Hamburg for several years and with James Last orchestra 1969-1975.
