= Last-Becker Ensemble =

Last-Becker Ensemble was a German jazz group that was popular in the late 1940s and early 1950s. The band was formed in 1948 by James Last (bass) and included his brothers Werner Last (trombone and accordion) and Robert Last (drums). The six-piece band was also included Karl-Heinz Becker (saxophone), Heinz Schultze (guitar) and Helmut Zacharias (violin). In 1950, James was voted as the best jazz bassist in Germany an award he won again in 1951 and 1952. The band, which was an offshoot of the Radio Bremen dance orchestra conducted by Hans-Gunther Oesterreich, broke up in 1956.

The group is now known more for the later successes of its members after the group's break-up. James Last became a bandleader, selling millions of records. Werner Last also found success as a bandleader under the name Kai Warner. Robert Last was the drummer for both of his brothers' bands and also formed his own studio band. Heinz Schultze played guitar for the Last brothers in their respective orchestras. Helmut Zacharias became an internationally known pop-jazz violin soloist; his records were arranged by James.

== See also ==
- Jazz in Germany
