= Lanese =

Lanese is a surname. Notable people with the surname include:

- Bob Lanese (1941–2024), American trumpet player
- Laura Lanese, American politician
- Tullio Lanese (1947–2025), Italian football referee
