= Harald Ende =

German musician (1929–2018)

Harald Ende (15 February 1929 – 27 October 2018), was a German saxophone, flute and accordion player who was active in the Hamburg music scene from the 1950s to the 1990s.

== Biography ==
Harald Ende was born in Hamburg on 15 February 1929. He attended the local music school and was trained as a classical clarinetist. However, upon graduating, he soon found that in order to get steady work, he had to play in a more popular context. In 1958, he joined the NDR (Norddeutscher Rundfunk, or North German Radio) big band. He also worked as a studio musician for many popular German recording acts like Bert Kaempfert. In 1968, he joined the James Last Orchestra, for which he had to learn how to play the flute; James Last himself taught Ende how to play the instrument. A big band musician enamoured with the work of Buddy Rich and Count Basie, Ende recorded and toured with Last until the end of 1979, after which he devoted most of his career to his work with the NDR big band, often backing up well-known jazz stars like Joe Pass and Chet Baker. One popular sideline act was his accordion duo with fellow Last and Kaempfert bandmate Günter Platzek, known as The Pop Kids. Now retired, Ende took part in the 80th anniversary celebration of the birth of Bert Kaempfert in 2003. Ende died on 27 October 2018, at the age of 89.
