= Skinny Minnie =

1958 song by Bill Haley and his Comets

1958 Decca 45, 9-30592, Bill Haley and His Comets.

1958 sheet music cover, Valley Brook.

"Skinny Minnie" is a 1958 song co-written and recorded by Bill Haley and his Comets. The song was released as a Decca single which became a Top 40 chart hit in the U.S., peaking at #22 on the Billboard chart.

== Background ==
"Skinny Minnie" was composed by Bill Haley with Milt Gabler, Rusty Keefer, and Catherine Cafra. The song was released as a Decca single, 9-30592, backed with "Sway With Me", reaching no. 22 on the Billboard chart and no. 25 on the Cash Box chart. The song was featured on the 1958 Decca album Bill Haley's Chicks. The song became a rock and roll standard which was covered by scores of bands and singers.

In 1966, Bill Haley and the Comets recorded a new version of the song as "La Flaca Miny" with Spanish lyrics sung by Bill Haley's wife Martha Velasco Haley. The song was released on the 1966 Orfeon LP Whisky A Go Go, LP-12-478. The session was recorded at Orfeon Studio A in Mexico City featuring Bill Haley on vocals, Rudy Pompilli on saxophone, Johnny Kay on lead guitar, John "Bam Bam" Lane on drums, Al Rappa on bass, Julian Bert on piano, Mike Shay on guitar, and Martha Velasco Haley on background vocals. The album was re-released on Ember as EMB 3396 in 1968 in the UK as The King of Rock Bill Haley Plays.

The 1958 recording appeared on the 1968 Decca compilation album Bill Haley's Greatest Hits! and the 1972 MCA Records career retrospective album Golden Hits.

The track appeared in the 2002 Austrian film Taxi für eine Leiche or Taxi for a Corpse.

== Personnel ==
The recording session was by Bill Haley and His Comets at the Pythian Temple, New York City on February 6, 1958 with the following personnel:

- Bill Haley (vocal and rhythm guitar)
- Franny Beecher (lead guitar)
- Billy Williamson (steel guitar)
- Rudy Pompilli (tenor saxophone)
- Johnny Grande (piano)
- Al Rex (bass guitar)
- Ralph Jones (drums)
- Rusty Keefer (guitar)

== Cover versions ==
1964 sheet music cover for Carter-Lewis recording featuring Jimmy Page, Burlington Music, London.

- Carter-Lewis and the Southerners (featuring Jimmy Page on lead guitar), March 27, 1964, Oriole CB 1919, 45 single b/w "Easy to Cry"; Your Time Is Gonna Come: The Roots of Led Zeppelin, 1964-1969 album, 2007
- Tony Sheridan recorded this song four times. The first version was issued on his album My Bonnie and also included on his EP entitled Ya Ya, both credited to him and the Beat Brothers and released in Germany in 1962. Contrary to popular belief, the Beatles were not the backing group on this recording. The second version was included on his 1964 album called Just A Little Bit Of Tony Sheridan (Polydor - 46 429) and issued as a single, (Polydor NH 52 324, b/w "Sweet Georgia Brown" in Germany (this b-side backed by the Beatles) and Polydor NH 52 927, b/w "You'd Better Move On" in the UK) backed by The Bobby Patrick Big Six but credited as the Beat Brothers (This recording reached #4 on both the West Germany and Bavaria charts on December 12, 1964 as reported in the Billboard Hits of the World chart, page 19.Billboard). It was also included in the compilation album Die Neue Polydor-Starparade in November of that year. All these previous recordings were erroneously issued with the title spelled Skinny Minny. A third recording was issued as a bonus track on the CD Vagabond in 2002 (Bear Family Records) and the last, on his homonymous album, published posthumously in 2018 by the Opus 3 label.
- Gerry and the Pacemakers, June, 1965, Laurie 45 single, b/w "It's Gonna Be Alright"; A side reached #23 on the Billboard Hot 100; I'll Be There U.S. album; The Best of the EMI Years (2008)
- Beat Chics (featuring Jimmy Page on lead guitar), November 6, 1964, Decca F 12016, b/w "Now I Know", 45 single
- Goldie & the Gingerbreads, A side 45 single, Spokane 45-4005, "Skinny Vinnie", with incorrect songwriting credit on the label, 1964
- Wayne Fontana & the Mindbenders, 1965, It's Wayne Fontana and the Mindbenders album, Fontana
- Johnny Hallyday, 1965, in French as "J'attends minuit"
- Jimmy and the Rackets, 1964, Elite Special 9427-45, b/w "O Mona Lisa", 45 single, #1 on the German charts in 1964, 32 weeks on the charts
- JD & The Expressions, Guyden 45, 2122, 1965
- James Last Band on the album Non Stop Dancing 65
- The Rollicks, also known as The Shouters, The Rollicks, Bear Family BCD 16478 AR, 1990
- Jerry Williams, 1965, Sonet LP, Mr. Dynamite Explodes Again!, Grand Prix album Rock & Roll Time, 1968, EP
- The Sonics, on 1966 album Boom
- Andy and the Manhattans, Musicor 45 single, MU 1112
- Teddy Lee, RCA Victor compact 33 picture sleeve single, 1967
- The Rubins, also known as The Five Rubins, live, 1964
- The Mummies, 1990, Rekkids; Never Been Caught album, Telstar, 2002. Rekkids 1991 45 single, 162.
- Bryan Davies, Australian 45 single b/w "I Should Have Stayed in Bed", HMV, April, 1965; Barry Gibb of The Bee Gees wrote and sang backing and harmony vocals on "I Should Have Stayed in Bed"
- Lee Curtis and the All-Stars, Liverpool rock group, 1964
- Louis Prima, Keely Smith, Sam Butera, and The Witnesses, The Capitol Recordings; The EP Collection, 2000. Sam Butera released the song as a 1964 45 single, PR 1003-B, on Prima with "Music by Louis Prima & The Witnesses". The label has incorrect songwriting credits. The song appears on the 1961 Capitol album, 1677, The Continental Twist.
- Dennis Hermann, 1980
- The Lyres, 1987, Early Years Live, 1979-1983, Crypt, 1997
- Snooks Eaglin, 1995, Soul's Edge album on Black Top
- The Lions, 1964, 45 single b/w "Sticks and Stones", TD 246; Hit House Shake, King Beat, 1989
- Peter Briggs & The Vikings, 45 single, Go!!, G-5021-B, 1966.
- Sten & Stanley, 1965, Decca 45, Decca F 44503, b/w "Goldfinger"
- The Watusi (band), 2009
- Albert West, 1988, West & Friends album, Arcade 01 3290 61
- Jumpin' Gene Simmons, Sun rockabilly singer, 1965, 45 single b/w "I'm A Ramblin' Man", HI 45-2086; Haunted House: The Complete Jumpin' Gene Simmons on Hi Records
- Ray Brown & The Whispers, Australian rock group, 1964, Ray Brown & The Whispers album, Leedon LL-31646
- The Liverpool 5, as The 5 Liverpools, 45 single b/w "Tokio", 1964, CBS 1623; Tokio International album, CBS 62460, 1965
- The Rocking Ghosts, Danish rock band, The Rocking Ghosts album, Metronome MLP 15166, 1964
- The Shanes, Swedish rock group, The Shanes, Rock-In-Beat, 2000
- Johnnie Cliff Five, Die Hamburg Szene, 2001
- Alan Dale, Raven RVLP15, 1963; Alan Dale and The Houserockers: The Early Masters
- Bill Haley's Comets, Rock and Roll Survivors Featuring Al Rappa and Joey Welz. Bill Haley's Comets featuring Al Rappa was one of several continuation groups established after Haley's death in 1981.
- The Tigers (Japanese band), Legend of The Tigers: Rare and Unreleased Tracks, 2003; The Tigers on Stage, 1967
- The Team Beats, Smash! Boom! Bang!, Bear Family BCD 16466, 2001
- Ricky King, Rock `n` Roll Party, Epic 26158, 1984
- Larry Donn, That's What I Call a Ball, 2003, Collector/Wht
- Bill Blaine and The Dynamics, Western Australian Snake Pit Rock 'N' Roll, Vol. 1, 2004; The Rockin' Years
- Me and The Other Guys, 1966 45 single on Hit Cat as 102
- Bill Haley Orchestra, 2008, Let the Good Times Roll album, CultSound. German tribute band.
- Johnny Kay's Rockets released a recording of the song on the 2009 CD Johnny Kay: Tale of a Comet on Hydra.
- Bill Haley Jr.
- Jesse Robin
- Lattie Moore and The Emperors, "Skinny Minnie Shimmy" b/w "You Got Me Wondering". RKR 100-200, Olympic Records Ohio, 1962.
- Miki Volek and Olympic
- The Blue Cats
- The Hillbilly Voodoo Dolls
- The Zettlers, A side 45 single, Swe Disc SWES 1105, Sweden, 1965
