= The Lonely Shepherd =

Instrumental piece by James Last

Song by James Last and Gheorghe Zamfir

from the album Memories of Russia
- Released: 1977
- Genre: Classical
- Length: 4:25
- Label: Polydor
- Songwriter: James Last
- Producer: James Last

"The Lonely Shepherd", also known as Einsamer Hirte or Der einsame Hirte in German or as El pastor solitario in Spanish, is an instrumental piece by James Last, first released in a recording with the Romanian panflutist Gheorghe Zamfir.

== Background ==
Originally, the title was planned for the album Filmmusik ohne Filme, which was only to contain original compositions by Last. This album was never released, so "The Lonely Shepherd" was published on Last's 1977 album Memories of Russia (Russland Erinnerungen). In the same year, it was also released as a single, which reached number 22 in the music charts in Germany. With this recording, Gheorghe Zamfir, who had already published a number of records, succeeded in an international breakthrough. Among other things, he accompanied Last on his 1978 tour.

"The Lonely Shepherd" has repeatedly been used as a soundtrack. In 1979, it was used as the title theme for the six-part television series Golden Soak (Das Gold der Wüste). In 1983 it was used as the love theme of a Venezuelan series called Chao, Cristina produced by the Venezuelan TV network RCTV and again in 1984 in the Oscar-nominated animated short film Paradise. In 2003, Quentin Tarantino used the recording as soundtrack in a scene and in the closing credits of his film Kill Bill: Volume 1. On the DVD, Gheorghe Zamfir is mistakenly credited as the title's producer.

The title has enjoyed unbroken popularity up to today and is newly recorded by numerous artists. A rap version by Lamar in 1999 was quite successful, as well as a version by Michael Hirte, which enabled him to win the television talent-show Das Supertalent in December 2008. As of 2025, the performance of the piece by Zamfir and André Rieu's Johann Strauss Orchestra on YouTube has over 200 million views.

== See also ==
- List of music released by Romanian artists that has charted in major music markets
