= Günter Platzek =

German musician

Günter Platzek (18 July 1930 in Hanover, Germany – 29 November 1990 in Hamburg, Germany) was a German keyboard player. He became known for his longtime work with the James Last Orchestra, of which he was a member from 1965 up until his death. He was also a member of the NDR (Norddeutscher Rundfunk, or North German Radio) big band, the Alfred Hause tango orchestra and the Bert Kaempfert Orchestra. An accomplished keyboard, accordion and xylophone player, he formed an accordion duet group called The Pop Kids with fellow Last bandmate Harald Ende. His work with James Last featured his unique improvised piano phrases, which drew on jazz, blues and rock influences and were played with a distinctively dry staccato tone. During the 1980s, his accordion duet with Jo Ment on the song "Biscaya" became a highlight of James Last's live concerts. He died in Hamburg from a heart attack on 29 November 1990.
