= Ion Niță =

Romanian footballer (born 1948)

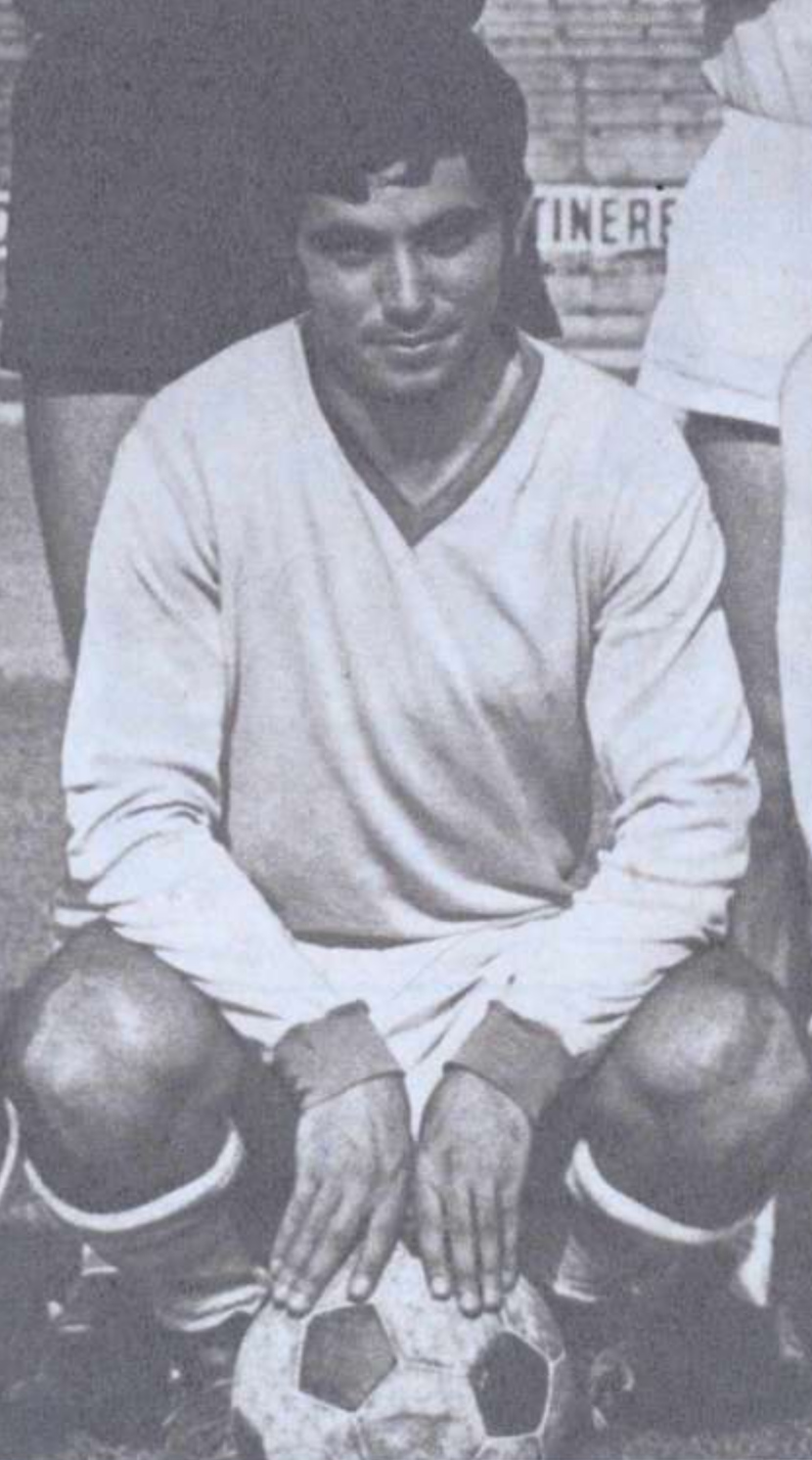

Personal information
- Date of birth: 21 February 1948 (age 78)
- Place of birth: Dragodana, Romania
- Height: 1.64 m (5 ft 5 in)
- Positions: Midfielder; forward

Senior career*
Years	Team	Apps	(Gls)
1965–1966	Dinamo Pitești	1	(0)
1966	Dunărea Calafat		
1967–1974	Universitatea Craiova	178	(15)
1975–1977	Steagul Roșu Brașov (Note: The statistics for the 1975–76 and 1976–77 Divizia B seasons are unavailable.)	14	(1)
1979–1980	Tractorul Brașov		
Total		193	(16)

International career
1966–1968	Romania U23	2	(0)
- * Club domestic league appearances and goals

Ion Niță (born 21 February 1948) is a Romanian former footballer who played as a midfielder and forward.

He was part of "U" Craiova's team that won the 1973–74 Divizia A, which was the club's first trophy.

== Club career ==
Niță was born on 21 February 1948 in Dragodana, Romania. He began his senior career at Dinamo Pitești, making his Divizia A debut under coach Vasile Ștefan on 10 April 1966 in a 2–2 draw against Universitatea Cluj.

Subsequently, Niță had a brief spell with Dunărea Calafat, and in 1966 he joined Universitatea Craiova. There, he made his debut in European competitions, playing in both legs of the 4–2 aggregate loss to Pécsi Dózsa in the first round of the 1970–71 Inter-Cities Fairs Cup. "U" was close to winning the title in the 1972–73 season, but they finished in second place on equal points with Dinamo București, losing controversially on goal difference. This outcome led poet Adrian Păunescu to nickname Craiova as "Campioana unei mari iubiri" (The Champion of a great love). In the first round of the 1973–74 UEFA Cup season, "U" Craiova got past Fiorentina, being eliminated in the following one by Standard Liège, with Niță playing three games in the campaign. In the same season, Niță was part of Craiova's team that won the league title, which was the club's first trophy, being used by coach Constantin Cernăianu in 29 matches in which he scored two goals. In the last round of that season, he played as a starter and was replaced in the 56th minute with Iulian Bălan in the 0–0 draw against Petrolul, as the team earned the point that mathematically secured the championship. Niță received a grade 7 in the Sportul newspaper for his performance in that match.

In the middle of the 1974–75 season, Niță left Universitatea to join Steagul Roșu Brașov. There, he made his last Divizia A appearance on 29 June 1975 in a 2–1 home win over Dinamo București, totaling 193 matches with 16 goals in the competition. However, Steagul Roșu was relegated at the end of that season, but he stayed with the club for two more seasons. Niță ended his career after playing for Tractorul Brașov during the 1979–80 Divizia B season.

== International career ==
From 1966 to 1968, Niță played two games for Romania's under-23 national team.

== Personal life ==
In 2023, Niță received the Honorary Citizen of Craiova title.

== Career statistics ==
=== Club ===
Appearances and goals by club, season and competition
Club	Season	League			National Cup		Continental		Total	
Club	Season	Division	Apps	Goals	Apps	Goals	Apps	Goals	Apps	Goals
Dinamo Pitești	1965–66	Divizia A	1	0	0	0	–		1	0
Dinamo Pitești	Total		1	0	0	0	–		1	0
Dinamo București	1966–67	Divizia A	14	1	1	0	–		15	1
Dinamo București	1967–68	Divizia A	22	2	2	0	–		24	2
Dinamo București	1968–69	Divizia A	25	6	1	0	–		26	6
Dinamo București	1969–70	Divizia A	14	0	0	0	–		14	0
Dinamo București	1970–71	Divizia A	24	3	1	0	2 (Note: Appearances in the Inter-Cities Fairs Cup)	0	27	3
Dinamo București	1971–72	Divizia A	23	0	0	0	–		23	0
Dinamo București	1972–73	Divizia A	21	1	0	0	–		21	1
Dinamo București	1973–74	Divizia A	29	2	1	0	3 (Note: Appearances in the UEFA Cup)	0	33	2
Dinamo București	1974–75	Divizia A	30	3	1	0	–		35	5
Dinamo București	Total		178	15	6	0	5	0	189	15
Steagul Roșu Brașov	1974–75	Divizia A	14	1	0	0	–		14	1
Steagul Roșu Brașov	1975–76	Divizia B					–			
Steagul Roșu Brașov	1976–77	Divizia B					–			
Steagul Roșu Brașov	Total		14	1			–		14	1
Tractorul Brașov	1979–80	Divizia B					–			
Career total			193	16	6	0	5	0	204	16

== Honours ==
Universitatea Craiova

- Divizia A: 1973–74
