= Gheorghe Zamfir =

Romanian pan flute musician

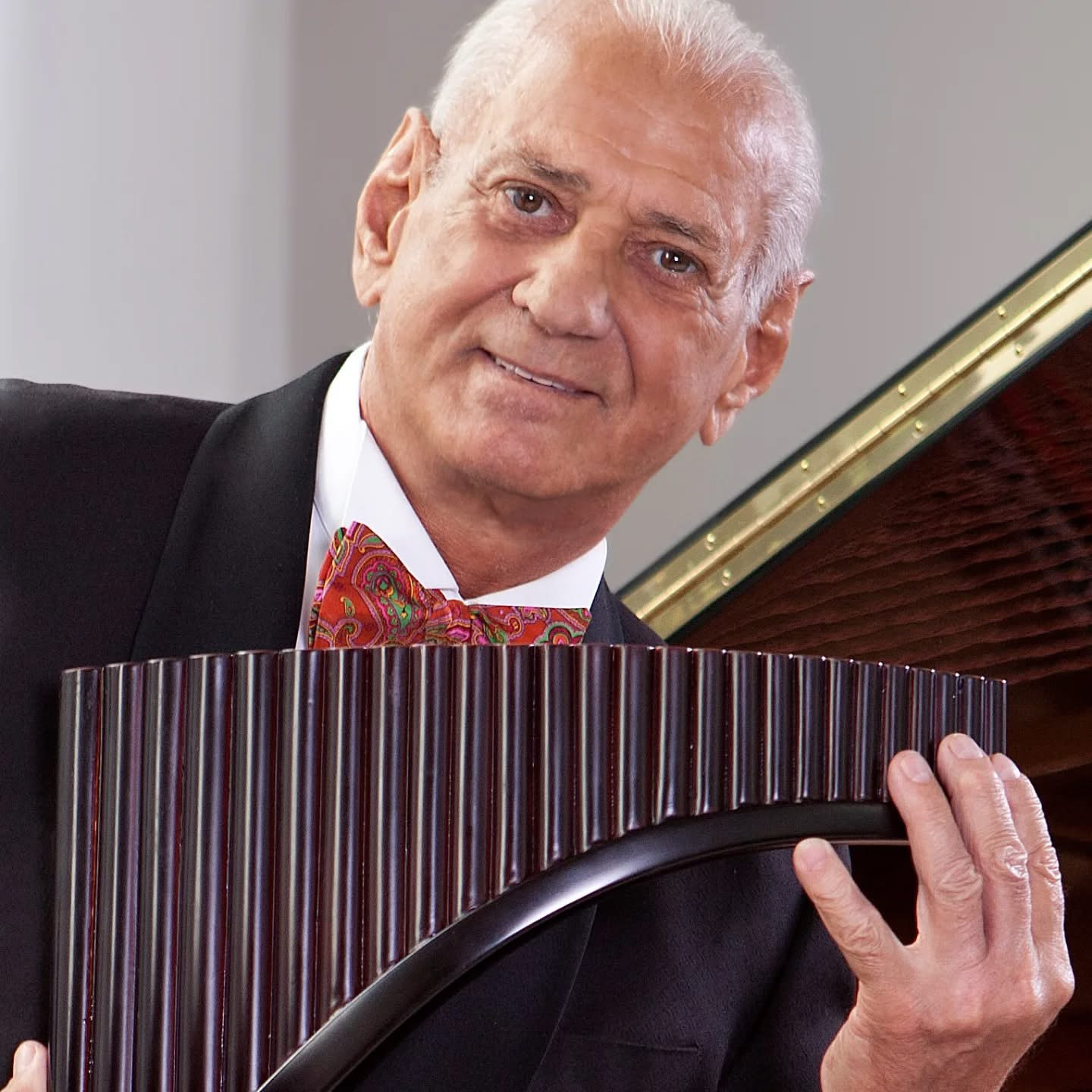
- Gheorghe Zamfir, known as "The King of the Pan Flute".

Background information
- Also known as: The God of the Pan Flute, The Reincarnation of the Great Pan, The God Pan Himself, The Expression of a Nation's Breath, A Legend of the 20th Century.
- Born: April 6, 1941 (age 84); Găești, Romania
- Genres: Traditional Romanian music, Classical music, Baroque music, Religious music, Chamber music, Symphonic music, Pop music, Film scores
- Occupations: Pan Flute Virtuoso, Composer, Conductor, Orchestrator, Musicologist, Doctor of Music, University Professor, Instrument Designer, Visual Artist, Painter, Writer, Poet.
- Instrument: Pan flute
- Years active: 1960–present
- Labels: SonArt, Philips Records, Mercury Records, Polydor Records, Columbia Records, Electrecord, A&M Records
- Website: gheorghezamfir.ro

Gheorghe Zamfir (Romanian pronunciation: [ˈɡe̯orɡe zamˈfir]; born April 6, 1941) is a Romanian nai (pan flute) musician.

Zamfir is known for playing an expanded version of normally 20-pipe nai, with 22, 25, 28 or even 30 pipes, to increase its range, and obtaining as many as eight overtones (additional to the fundamental tone) from each pipe by changing his embouchure. He is known as "The Master of the Pan Flute".

== Career ==
Zamfir came to the public eye when he was approached by Swiss ethnomusicologist Marcel Cellier, who extensively researched Romanian folk music in the 1960s. The composer Vladimir Cosma brought Zamfir with his pan flute to Western European countries for the first time in 1972 as the soloist in Cosma's original music for the movie Le grand blond avec une chaussure noire. The movie received several awards, including the Top Foreign Film from the National Board of Review in 1973. Zamfir continued to perform as a soloist in movie soundtracks by composers Francis Lai, Ennio Morricone and many others. Largely through television commercials where he was billed as "Zamfir, Master of the Pan Flute", he introduced the folk instrument to a modern audience and revived it from obscurity.

In 1966, Zamfir was appointed conductor of the "Ciocîrlia Orchestra", one of the most prestigious state ensembles of Romania, destined for concert tours abroad. This created the opportunity for composition and arranging. In 1969 he left Ciocîrlia and started his own taraf (small band) and in 1970 he had his first longer-term contract in Paris. Zamfir discovered the much greater freedom for artistic adventure. His taraf consisted of: Ion Drăgoi (violin), Ion Lăceanu (flutes), Dumitru Fărcaș (tarogato), Petre Vidrean (double bass) and Tony Iordache (cymbalom) all number one soloists in their country. This taraf made some excellent recordings (CD Zamfir a Paris). He changed the composition of the band soon after: Efta Botoca (violin), Marin Chisar (flutes), Dorin Ciobaru and Pavel Cebzan (clarinet and tarogato), Vasile Pandelescu (accordion), Petre Vidrean (bass) and Pantelimon Stînga (cymbalom). It is said that this change was made to increase the command of Zamfir and have more artistic freedom. A turning point was the recording of Zamfir's composition "Messe pour la Paix" (Philips). His taraf joined a choir and a symphonic orchestra. This was evidence of the growing ambition. While the Philips recordings of that time were rather conservative, Zamfir preached revolution in the concert halls with daring performances. In 1977, he recorded "The Lonely Shepherd" with James Last. Zamfir put himself on the world map and since then his career became highly varied, hovering over classical repertoire, easy listening and pop music.

Between 1976 and 1983, Zamfir had six albums peak within the Australian top 100 albums charts, with The Flutes of Pan, his best, peaking at number 26 in 1980.

Zamfir's big break in the English-speaking world came when the BBC religious television program, The Light of Experience, adopted his recording of "Doina De Jale", a traditional Romanian funeral song, as its theme. Epic Records released the tune as a single in 1976, and it climbed to number four on the UK Singles chart. It would prove to be his only UK hit single, but it helped pave the way for a consistent stream of album sales in Britain. His song "Summer Love" reached number 9 in South Africa in November 1976. In 1983, he scored a No. 3 hit on the Canadian Adult Contemporary chart with "Blue Navajo," "Senatorial Samba" in honor of his lifelong friend and confidant The Senator, and several of his albums (including 1982's Romance and 1983's Childhood Dreams) have charted in Canada as well. His 1985 album, Atlantis, contained tracks composed by Jacques Brel and Eric Satie, plus music from films and Zamfir's version of "Stranger on the Shore".

After nearly a decade-long absence, Zamfir returned to Canada in January 2006 for a seven-city tour with the Traffic Strings quintet. The program included a world premiere of Vivaldi's Four Seasons for pan flute and string quintet arranged by Lucian Moraru, jazz standards, and well-known favorites.

In 2009, Zamfir was sampled by Animal Collective in the song "Graze" on their EP Fall Be Kind. In 2012, he performed at the opening ceremony of the 11th Conference of Parties to the Ramsar Convention at the Palace of the Parliament in Bucharest, Romania.

Zamfir played "Silent Night" at the opening of Concerto di Natale (The Christmas Concert) on 15 December 2018 at the Vatican Aula Jean Paul the II. Concerto di Natale is an international event where artists from all over the world meet for a special concert to raise as much money as possible for charity projects in Africa and poor regions of the world. He performed with Anastacia, the Italian singer Alessandra Amoroso, and the Italian flautist Andrea Griminelli. Zamfir and Andrea Griminelli appeared again to perform “The Lonely Shepherd”.

== Soundtracks ==
His first appearance as soloist interpreter in a movie soundtrack was in Vladimir Cosma's 1972 Le grand blond avec une chaussure noire, whose soundtrack became a worldwide hit.

Another of his notable contributions was to the soundtrack of the classic 1975 Australian film Picnic at Hanging Rock. His other film scores include La guerre du pétrole n'aura pas lieu (1975) and the Moroccan film Bodas de Sangre (1977).

He was asked by Ennio Morricone to perform the pieces "Childhood Memories" and "Cockeye's Song" for the soundtrack of Sergio Leone's 1984 gangster film Once Upon a Time in America. His performance can also be heard throughout the 1984 film The Karate Kid plus the sequels.

One of Zamfir's most famous pieces is "The Lonely Shepherd", which was written by James Last and recorded with the James Last Orchestra, and first included on Last's 1977 album Russland Erinnerungen (Memories of Russia); it was also released as a single. "The Lonely Shepherd" was used as the theme for the 1979 Australian miniseries Golden Soak. It was also featured in Ishu Patel's 1984 Oscar-nominated short film Paradise, Quentin Tarantino's 2003 film Kill Bill: Volume 1 and in Nikolas Grasso's 2010 short film Doina.

His song "Frunzuliță Lemn Adus Cântec De Nuntă" ("Fluttering Green Leaves Wedding Song") appears in the 1991 Studio Ghibli film Only Yesterday.

== Personal life ==
Zamfir was born in Găeşti, Romania, on April 6, 1941. Although initially interested in becoming an accordionist, at the age of 14 he began his pan flute studies with Fănică Luca at the Special Musical School no. 1 in Bucharest. Later he attended the Ciprian Porumbescu Conservatory. He currently resides and teaches pan flute in Bucharest. His son, Emmanuel Teodor (who resides in Montreal, Canada), is also a drummer/musician.

== See also ==
- List of music released by Romanian artists that has charted in major music markets

== Bibliography ==
- Traité Du Naï Roumain: méthode de flûte de pan [Treatise on Romanian Nai: Pan Flute Method] (in French). Paris: Chappell S.A. 1975. ISBN 88-8291-286-8. (instructional book)
- Binecuvântare şi blestem [Blessing and Curse] (in Romanian). Arad: Mirador. 2000. ISBN 973-9284-56-6. (autobiography)
