= Dragodana =

- Commune
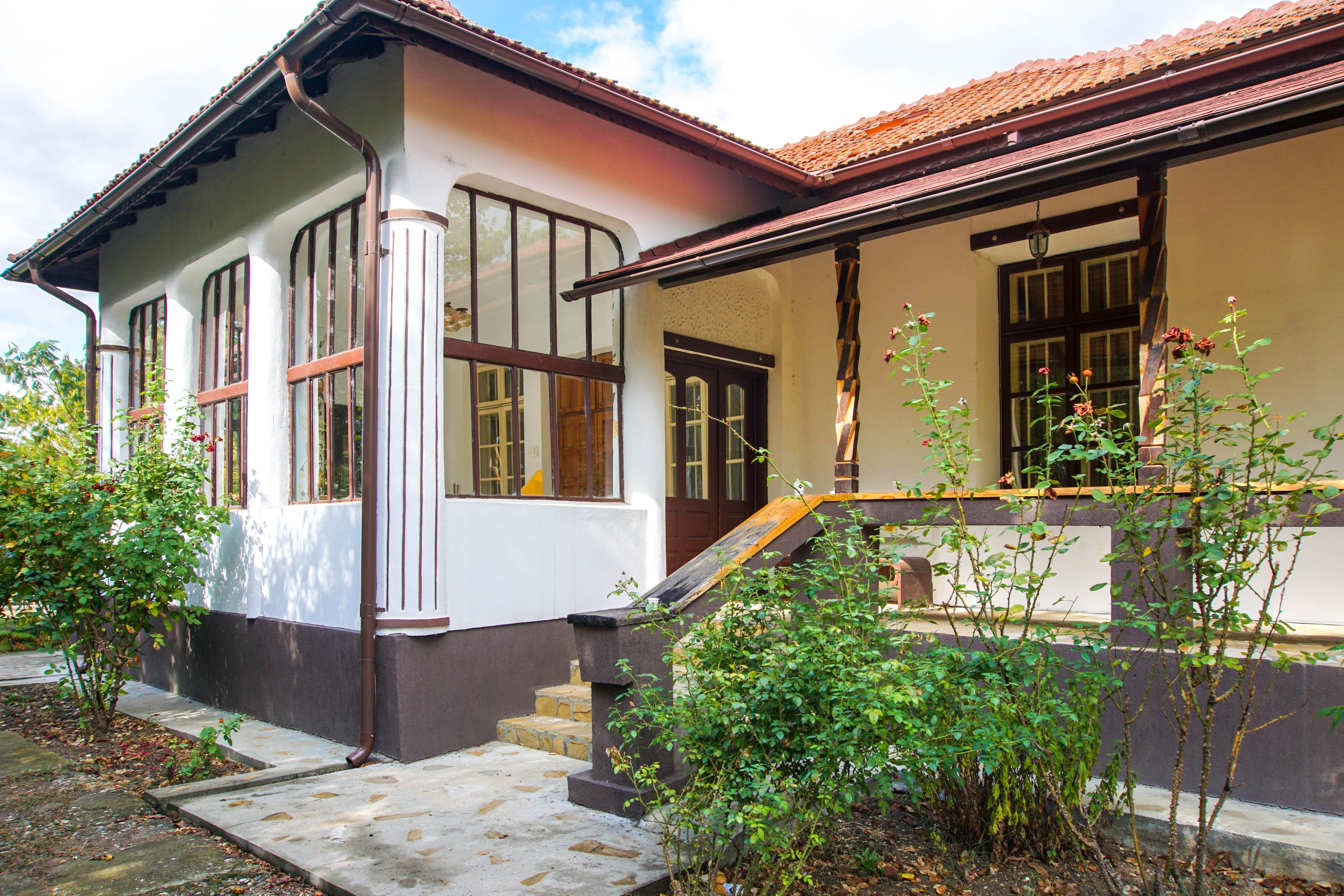
- The Koșca manor in Dragodana

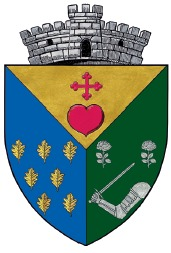
- Coat of arms

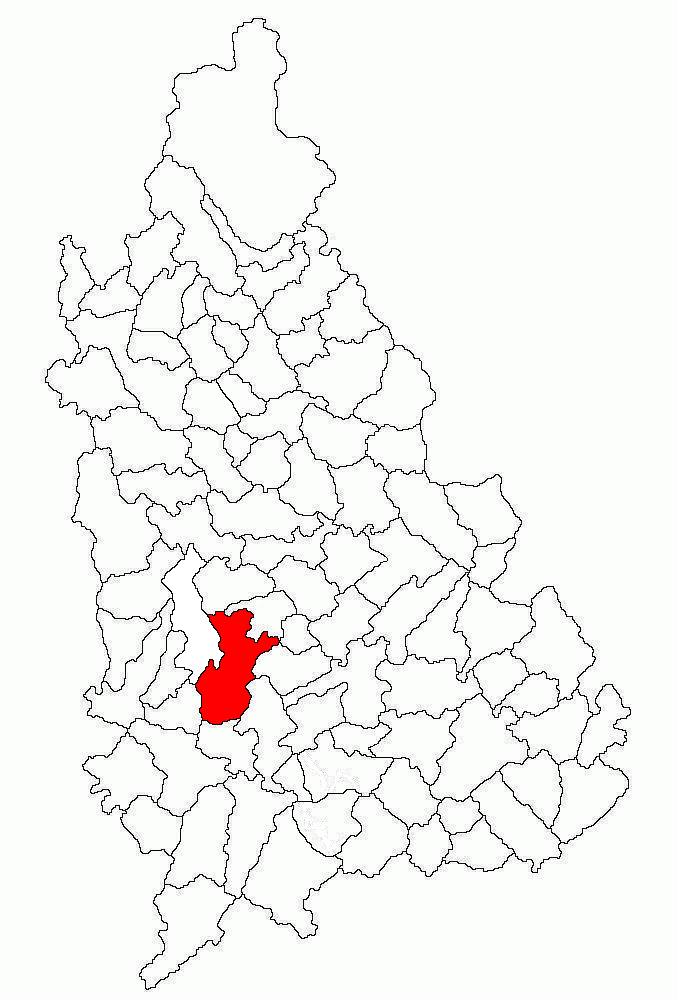
- Location in Dâmbovița County

- Location in Romania
- Coordinates: 44°44′N 25°21′E
- Country: Romania
- County: Dâmbovița

Government
  - Mayor (2024–2028): Gheorghe Sandu (PSD)
- Area: 65.77 km^{2} (25.39 sq mi)
- Elevation: 182 m (597 ft)
- Population (2021-12-01): 6,186
  - Density: 94.06/km^{2} (243.6/sq mi)
- Time zone: UTC+02:00 (EET)
  - Summer (DST): UTC+03:00 (EEST)
- Postal code: 137200
- Area code: +(40) 245
- Vehicle reg.: DB
- Website: primariadragodana.ro

Dragodana is a commune in Dâmbovița County, Muntenia, Romania with a population of 6,186 people as of 2021. It is composed of seven villages: Boboci, Burduca, Cuparu, Dragodana, Pădureni, Picior de Munte, and Străoști.

Situated in the central part of the Wallachian Plain, the commune lies on the banks of the river Sabar and is located in the central-south part of Dâmbovița County. Dragodana is crossed by national road DN72, which runs from the town of Găești, 5 km (3.1 mi) to the west, to the county seat, Târgoviște, 23 km (14 mi) to the north, and on to Ploiești. The country's capital, Bucharest, is 76 km (47 mi) to the southeast and can be reached via DN7.

Historical population
Year	Pop.	±%
2002	6,972	—
2011	6,775	−2.8%
2021	6,186	−8.7%
Source: Census data

== Natives ==
- Ion Niță (born 1948), footballer
- Mariana Preda (born 1994), pan flute musician
- Niculae Zamfir (born 1958), wrestler
