= Kai Warner =

German bandleader and musician

Pops For Minis, 1967

Kai Warner was the stage name of Werner Last (27 October 1926 – 9 July 1982), a German bandleader and musician, and the brother of James Last and Robert Last, also musicians.

== Biography ==
Born in Bremen, Warner took piano lessons from Ernst Weelen and received theory instruction from the Max Reger and Engelbert Humperdinck student Richard Bulling.

After the war, Werner Last appeared as a trombonist along with his brothers Hans (bassist, later known as James Last) and Robert Last (drummer) in Bremen music halls and in the American clubs in the vicinity of Bremerhaven. At this point, he was discovered by the composer and manager Friedrich Meyer and hired for the newly formed dance orchestra of Radio Bremen. The Last brothers became well known as members of the Last-Becker Ensemble. Warner Last found his first success as an arranger. After the disbandment of the Bremen dance orchestra in 1948, he played for a time in a 12-man band, then went to seek his fortune in the USA. Before this, he married the 18-year-old Hjördis Harlow, an American of Norwegian descent. From this marriage came two sons, Steven and Warner.

In the USA, Warner had to make his living as a casual labourer for several months before he was admitted into the New York musician's union. As a trombonist, he belonged to several renowned big bands. As well, he studied music theory at New York University with Schillinger professor Rudolf Schramm.

In 1958, Warner Last returned to Germany and arranged numerous film scores. In 1966 he signed a contract as a producer with Polydor; he discovered and produced Renate Kern. As Kai Warner, he started his own orchestra, which included many musicians who played with James Last (such as his brother Robert Last, who had already played drums on the earliest James Last sessions). In 1975, Kai Warner switched from Polydor to Philips.

Besides his LPs like Pops For Minis, Happy Together, Goldtimer 1 and 2, his name is forever linked with the Go-In series, which continued later on Philips under the name Go-In Party.

He died in Hamburg aged 55.

== Discography ==
Kai Warner:

- Pops For Minis (Polydor, 1967)
- This Is Kai Warner (Polydor, 1968)
- Swing Out '69 (Polydor, 1969)
- So In Love (Polydor, 1969)
- Go In Folge 3 - 28 Spitzenschlager Zum Tanzen (Polydor, 1969)
- Met De Postkoets Door Nederland (Polydor, 1971)
- Music For Two (Polydor, 1971)
- Hi-Fi-Stereo (Polydor, 1971)
- Wer Recht In Freuden Tanzen Will (Polydor, 1971)
- On The Road To Philadelphia (Philips, 1975)
- Swingin' Johann (Philips, 1975)
- Dance To The Beatles (Philips, 1976)
- Polka Wie Noch Nie (Philips, 1977)
- It's Country Time (Philips, 1980)

Kai Warner Singers:

- Happy Together (Polydor, 1967)
- Go In (Polydor, 1968)
- Happy Together Again (Polydor, 1968)
- Go In II - 28 Spitzenschlager Zum Tanzen (Polydor, 1969)
- Romantic Songs (Polydor, 1970)
- Love Songs (Polydor, 1970)
- Happy Songs (Polydor, 1970)
- Christmas Party International (Philips, 1975)
- Zum Tanz Marsch Marsch! (Philips, 1976)
- A Glass Of Champagne (Philips, 1976)
- 25 Famous Instrumental Worldhits (Philips, 1977)
- Dance Party (Polydor, 1978)
- Oriental Nights (Philips, 1978)
