= Jugureni =

- Commune
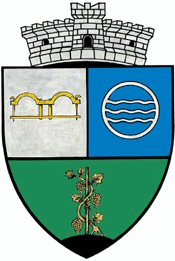
- Coat of arms

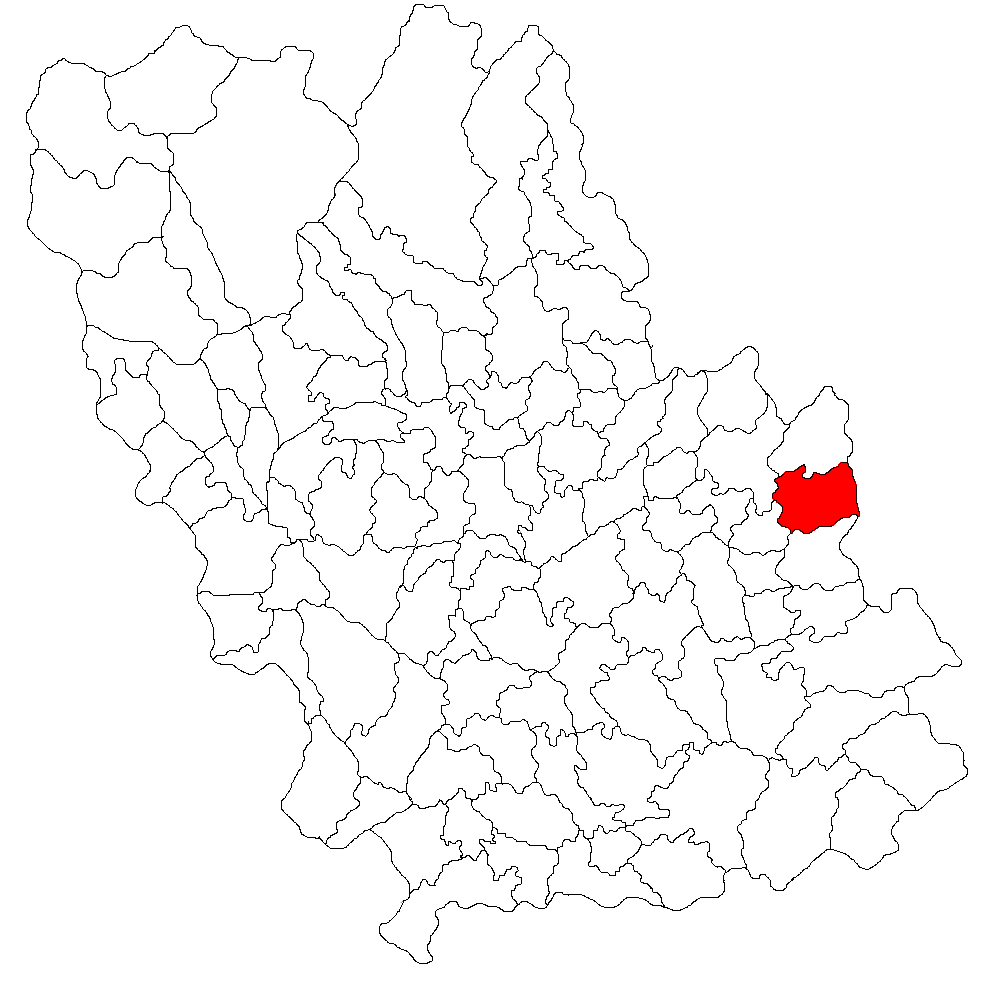
- Location in Prahova County

- Location in Romania
- Coordinates: 45°7′N 26°24′E
- Country: Romania
- County: Prahova

Government
  - Mayor (2024–2028): Constantin Mărcoceanu (PSD)
- Area: 26.85 km^{2} (10.37 sq mi)
- Elevation: 443 m (1,453 ft)
- Population (2021-12-01): 449
  - Density: 17/km^{2} (43/sq mi)
- Time zone: EET/EEST (UTC+2/+3)
- Postal code: 107330
- Area code: +(40) 244
- Vehicle reg.: PH
- Website: www.primariajugureni.ro

Jugureni is a commune in Prahova County, Muntenia, Romania. It is composed of five villages: Boboci, Jugureni, Trusctienii, Marginea Pădurii, and Valea Unghiului.

Historical population
Year	Pop.	±%
2002	743	—
2011	613	−17.5%
2021	449	−26.8%
Source: Census data
