= Robert Last (drummer) =

German drummer and bandleader

Robert Last (1923–1986) was a German drummer and bandleader.

The oldest brother of Werner Last (known as Kai Warner) and Hans Last (known as James Last) played together with his brothers in the dance and entertainment orchestra of Radio Bremen, went to the USA in 1954 and studied drumming with Sonny Igoe, the drummer for Woody Herman. Played, among other places, at the mirrored room of the Metropole Café on Broadway. He returned to Germany in 1960. Here he became the first drummer for the James Last Band and the Kai Warner Orchestra. He also played with Helmut Zacharias, Günther Fuhlisch and Bert Kaempfert. To this day, many rank him as the best drummer ever to work with James Last and his brother Werner.

In the early 1970s he started his own studio orchestra and put out a series of Happy Dancing albums on the Decca in Royal Sound Stereo label. His first LP was Non Stop Musical Party (DECCA SLK 16627-P). Other recordings: Happy Dancing 2/Non Stop Western Party, Happy Dancing 3/Non Stop Schiwago Party, Happy Dancing 4/Die aktuelle Non-Stop Hit Party, Happy Dancing 5/Die aktuelle Non-Stop Hit Party, Happy Dancing/28 unvergessene Melodien aus der Zwanzigern, Happy Dancing/28 unvergessene Melodien aus der Dreißigern.

Robert continued to play with the bands of his brothers during the early 70s. In 1972, the James Last Band toured Australia, with resounding success. All of the musicians performed brilliantly all night.(about 3 hours, almost non-stop). But there was one standout artist---Robert Last on the drums. Robert brought the house down with his drum solo after the intermission. However, a dispute developed between himself and James Last over some questionable personal behaviour on Robert's part during a tour of South Africa, and Robert was fired from the James Last Band.

In the 1980s he wanted to be independent, as he was apparently cheated by his producers. He continued to play with his brother Kai Warner's band until the latter's death in 1982. Despite the South Africa firing, Robert occasionally did session work with James Last, although he never re-joined the band full-time; James Last later said that if Robert had just spoken up and asked to be reinstated, he would have done so. Robert developed heart problems and died in 1986, a day after making amends with his younger brother.
