= Monaco International Film Festival =

Film festival

The Monaco International Film Festival is an annual international special interest film festival held in Monaco. It is a non-profit organization, formed in December 2003 and founded by Rosana Golden and Dean Bentley The festival focuses on non-violent films, screening films and productions from around the world, and awards are given in many categories. Its distinguished guests have included Dalai Lama. The festival's awards are called the Angel Film Awards.
