= Maria Dinulescu =

Romanian actress

Maria Dinulescu (Romanian pronunciation: [maˈri.a dinuˈlesku]; born 2 May 1981 in Ploieşti) is a Romanian actress.

== Acting career ==
Maria Dinulescu studied acting at the National University of Cinema and Drama in Bucharest, Romania. She came to international attention in 2003, when one of the first shorts she played in, "Traffic", won the Palme d'Or in Cannes. She came back to Cannes in 2007, as the lead female actress in the full-feature "California Dreamin' (endless)," the winner of the "Un Certain Regard" section. Her performance in this movie won her a few other awards including the Best Actress Prize at BIAF Georgia and Arte Mare from France.

Maria subsequently played the lead role in "Hooked", a film that had its world premiere at the 65th Venice film Festival. Her performance in "Hooked" was described as "bewitching" (Hollywood Reporter) and "bubbly (in a difficult role)" (Variety) and was rewarded with the Best Actress Prize at the Thessaloniki Film Festival and the Buenos Aires Film Festival.

Of the 12 full-length feature films that Maria has starred in, she has played the lead 7 times. She also has several television credits, including the HBO-produced Romanian version of the "In Treatment" HBO series. She has acted in more than 10 successful short films, commercials, and was the lead in the music video, "Peace" by Depeche Mode. In 2010, Dinulescu won the Esquire Magazine, Sexiest Woman Alive Atlas, 2010 for Romania.

She moved to Los Angeles where she studied at UCLA, Groundlings Theatre & School and she participate in many laboratory and workshops with prestigious actors, directors and teachers. Maria played in different short movies for USC and New York Film Academy students. "Stepping Out" brought her the award for best actress at Los Angeles Indie Film Fest 2014.

Maria has a master in Japanese theater and culture, is member of European Film Academy and speaks Romanian, English and Italian.

== Filmography ==
- Far from here (2016)
- Smokers Die Slowly Together (2016)
- Selfie 69 (2016)
- Double (2016)
- Rollover (2014)
- Stepping Out (2013)
- The Ridicule (2013)
- Plongeur (2012)
- Doina (2010)
- Beyond America (2008)
- L'enfance d'Icare (2008)
- The Dot Man (2008)
- Hooked (2008)
- Blood and Chocolate (2007)
- California Dreamin' endless (2007)
- Examen (2006)
- Impasse (2005)
- Le tramway d'Andréa (2005)
- Gadjé (2005)
- Milionari de weekend (2004)
- Camera ascunsă (2004)
- Trafic (2004)
- Forme aberrante (2003)
- Green Oaks (2003)
- Poveste la scara C (2003)
- 17 minute întârziere (2002)
- București-Wien, 8–15 (2000)

=== Series ===
- În derivã (2010)
- Păcatele Evei (2005)
