= James Last =

German composer and big band leader (1929–2015)

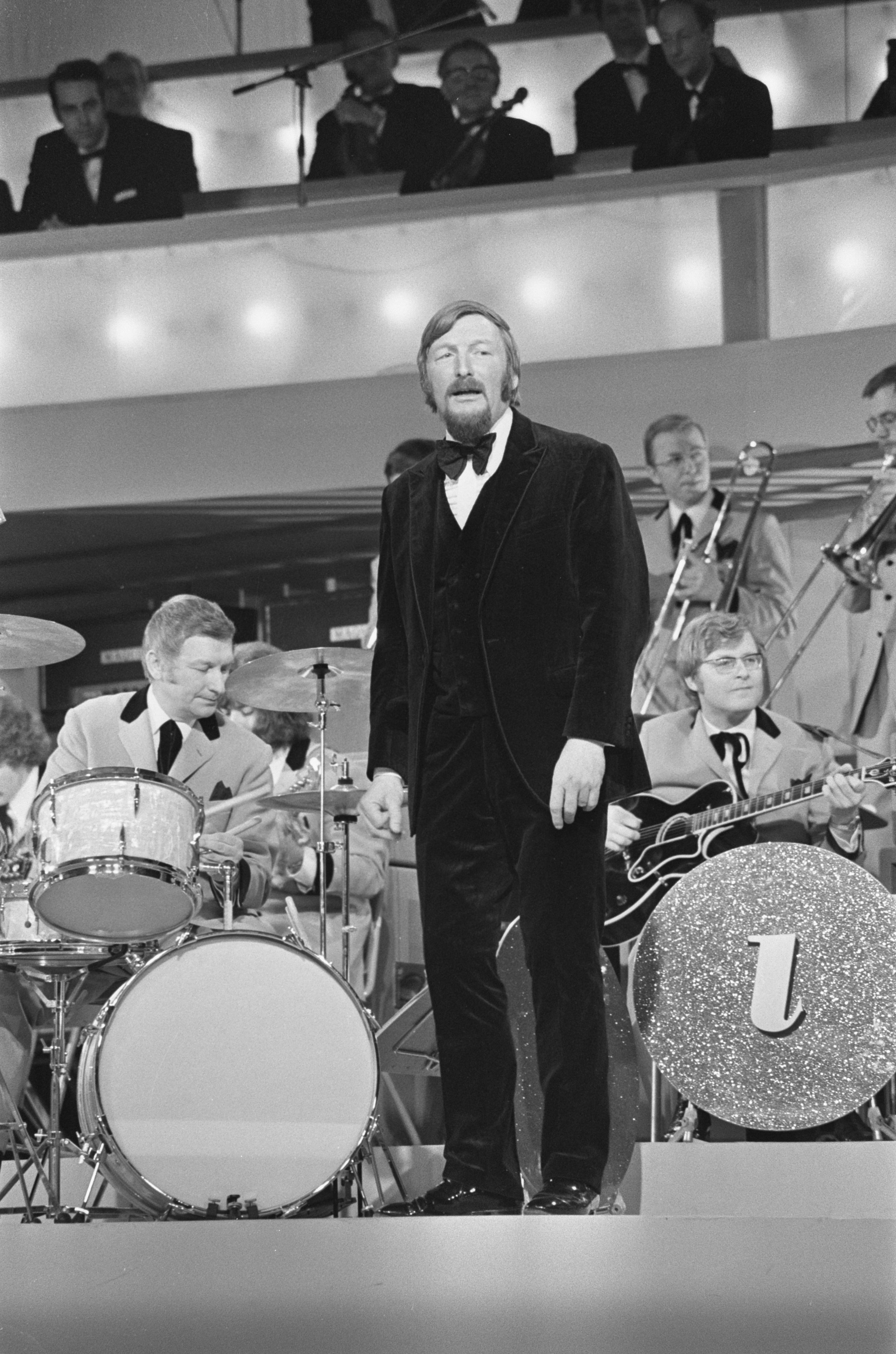
- Last in 1970

Background information
- Also known as: Hansi
- Born: Hans Last; 17 April 1929; Bremen, Germany
- Died: 9 June 2015 (aged 86) Palm Beach, Florida, U.S.
- Genre: Big band
- Occupation: Composer
- Instrument: Double bass
- Years active: 1946–2015
- Labels: Polydor; PolyGram; Universal; Eagle Rock; Warner Bros.
- Website: jameslast.com

James Last (German: [ˈdʒɛɪms ˈlaːst]; born Hans Last; 17 April 1929 – 9 June 2015) was a German composer and big band leader of the James Last Orchestra. Initially a jazz bassist, his trademark "happy music" made his numerous albums best-sellers in Germany and the United Kingdom, with 65 of his albums reaching the charts in the UK alone. His composition "Happy Heart" became an international success in interpretations by Andy Williams and Petula Clark.

Last is reported to have sold an estimated 200 million records worldwide in his lifetime of which 80 million were sold by 1973 and won numerous awards including 200 gold and 14 platinum discs in Germany, the International MIDEM Prize at MIDEM in 1969, and West Germany's highest civilian award, the Bundesverdienstkreuz. His album This Is James Last remained a UK best-seller for 48 weeks, and his song "Games That Lovers Play" has been covered over a hundred times. Last undertook his final tour months before his death at age 86, upon discovering in September 2014 that an illness had worsened. His final UK performance was his 90th at London's Royal Albert Hall, more than any other performer except Eric Clapton.

Last's trademark sound employed big band arrangements of well-known tunes with a jaunty dance beat, often heavy on bass and brass. Despite at times being derided by critics and purists as the "king of elevator music" or "acoustic porridge", his style and music were popular in numerous countries and cultures, including Japan, South Korea, the former Soviet Union, the US and UK, and his native Germany, where it became "the archetypal soundtrack of any German cellar bar party", and made him the "most commercially successful bandleader" of the second half of the 20th century.

== Early life ==
Last was born to Louis and Martha Last in Bremen, Germany. He was the younger brother of Robert Last and Werner Last (aka Kai Warner). His father worked for the public utility of the city of Bremen and Last grew up in the suburb of Sebaldsbrück. He began studying the piano at age 10, although he could play simple tunes such as the folk song "Hänschen klein" when he was 9. His first music teacher felt he lacked any musical talent. Last started playing more actively with his second tutor and switched to the double bass as a teenager. His home city of Bremen was bombed heavily during World War II, and he ran messages to air defence command posts during the raids. He entered the Bückeburg Military Music School of the German Wehrmacht at the age of 14 and learned to play bass, piano and tuba.

After the end of the war, he joined Hans Günther Oesterreich's Radio Bremen Dance Orchestra. In 1948 he became the leader of the Last-Becker Ensemble, which performed for seven years. He was voted as the best bassist in the country in a German jazz poll for 1950, 1951 and 1952. When the Last-Becker Ensemble disbanded, he became the in-house arranger for Polydor Records, as well as a number of European radio stations. During the next decade he helped arrange hits for artists such as Helmut Zacharias, Freddy Quinn, Lolita, Alfred Hause and Caterina Valente.

== Work ==
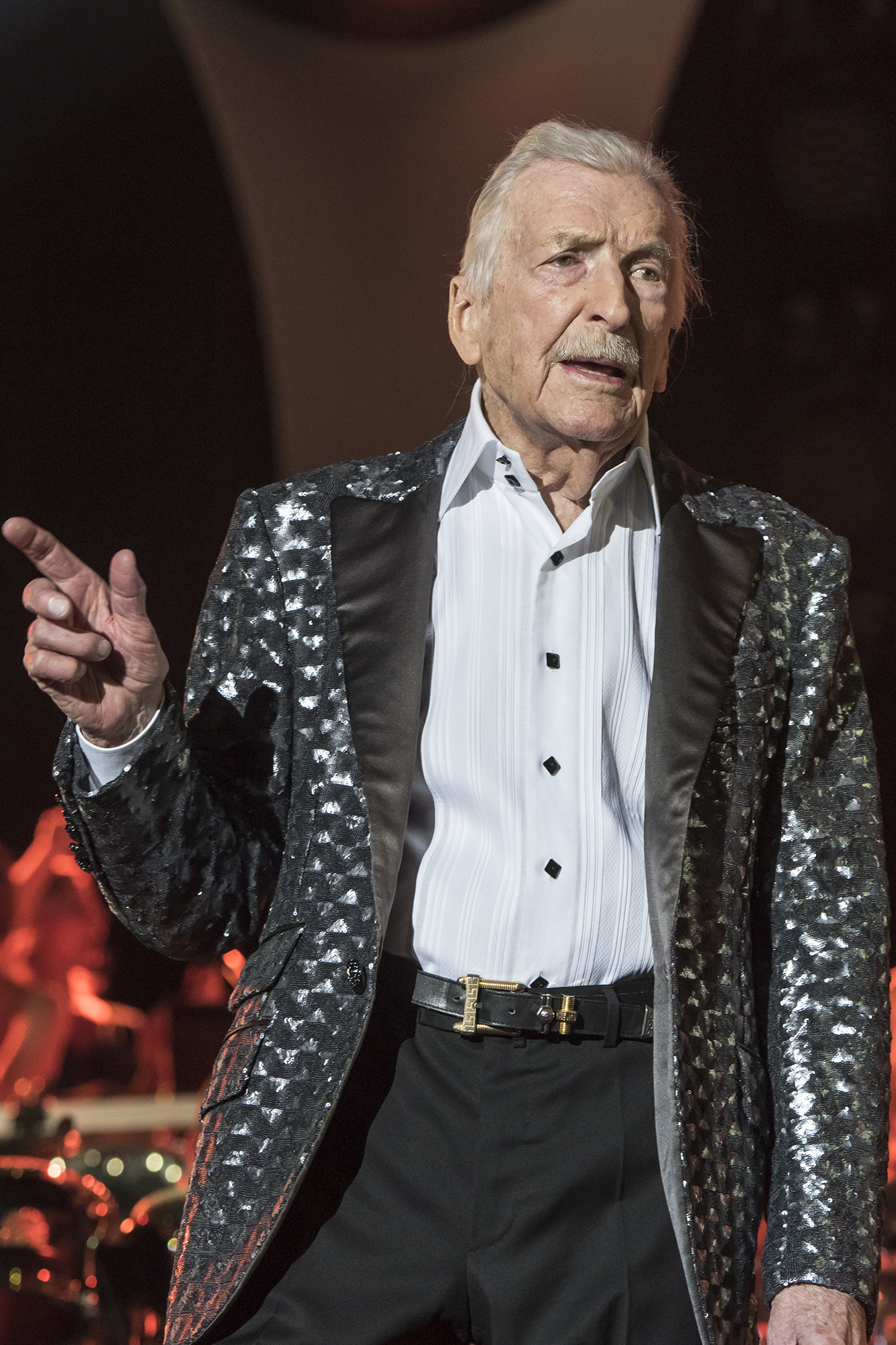
Last in April 2015, two months before his death

Last first released albums in the U.S. under the titles The American Patrol on Warner Bros. Records around 1964. He also released a series of nine albums in a series called Classics Up To Date which served up arrangements of classical melodies with strings, rhythm and wordless chorus from the mid-1960s until the early 1980s. Last's 1965 album, Non Stop Dancing, was a recording of brief renditions of popular songs, all tied together by an insistent dance beat and crowd noises. It was a hit and helped make him a major European star. Over the next four decades, Last released over 190 records, including several more volumes of Non Stop Dancing. On these records, he varied his formula by adding different songs from different countries and genres, as well as guest performers like Richard Clayderman and Astrud Gilberto.

He also had his own successful television series throughout the 1970s with guests including ABBA and Lynsey de Paul which was screened across Europe. Last's trademark sound employed big band arrangements of well-known tunes with a jaunty dance beat, often heavy on bass and brass.

Though his concerts and albums were consistently successful, especially in the UK, where he had 52 hit albums between 1967 and 1986, which made him second only to Elvis Presley in charting records, he had relatively few hit singles. In the UK, his only chart singles were "The Seduction", a cover version of the theme from American Gigolo (1980) composed by Giorgio Moroder, and "Biscaya" from the album Biscaya. His single "Mornings at Seven" became a familiar tune in Britain after the BBC used it as the theme music for an ice skating program. Figures for record sales vary widely, between 100 million at that time by 2006 and 200 million records worldwide in his lifetime. In Ireland, he is best known for his composition "Jägerlatein", which is the theme tune for national broadcaster RTÉ's sports programme the Sunday Game; the song was so popular with the Irish public that its replacement with another song caused controversy, and it was reinstated several years later.

In the US, where "The Seduction" became a Top 40 hit, peaking at No. 28 on the Billboard Hot 100 and No. 22 on the Adult Contemporary chart in May 1980. Last was somewhat more successful on the singles charts. In 2003, his song "Einsamer Hirte" (The Lonely Shepherd) which features the pan flute of Gheorghe Zamfir appeared on the soundtrack of the Quentin Tarantino movie Kill Bill Volume 1.

He won numerous popular and professional awards, including Billboard magazine's Star of the Year trophy in 1976, and was honoured for lifetime achievement with the German ECHO prize in 1994. His song "Music from Across the Way" (recorded by Andy Williams in 1972) is a melody with a classical feeling and was a worldwide hit; it was the only other Last single apart from "The Seduction" to reach the U.S. Hot 100, where it peaked at No. 84 (and No. 18 on the Adult Contemporary chart) in late 1971. (His only other U.S. chart single was a double-sided entry featuring remakes of the Village Stompers' "Washington Square" and Creedence Clearwater Revival's "Proud Mary", which reached No. 22 on the Adult Contemporary chart in early 1971).

Last was awarded the Carl Alan Award by Princess Margaret for being the leader of the most popular dance band of 1981. In Canada, he had three hits on the RPM Top Singles charts ("El Cóndor Pasa" at No. 46, "Music from Across the Way" at No. 28, "The Seduction" at No. 32) and four on the Adult Contemporary/MOR charts ("Music from..." at No. 2, "Heart of Gold" at No. 17, "The Seduction" at No. 36, "Reach for a Star" at No. 20).

Songs composed by Last which achieved success in the US include "Happy Heart" and "Music from Across the Way", both recorded by Andy Williams, "Games That Lovers Play", recorded by Eddie Fisher, and "Fool", recorded by Elvis Presley. By the time of his farewell tour in the spring of 2015, Last was reported to have sold well over 100 million albums.

His signature piece was "Orange Blossom Special". He played this at almost every concert. He encouraged the band to have fun with it and sometimes the band members would go into the audience and make a conga line with duck head umbrellas. It was always a popular piece at his concerts.

In February 2015, after almost 50 years on tour, James Last announced that he was finally bidding adieu to the stage. The last concert of his Non Stop Music James Last in Concert 2015 farewell tour took place in Lanxess Arena in Cologne on 26 April 2015.

== Personal life ==
Last married his first wife, Waltraud, in 1955; they had two children. After 42 years of marriage, Waltraud died in 1997. Two years later, Last married Christine Grundner from Bavaria. Last and Christine divided their time between homes in Florida and Hamburg.

== Financial difficulties ==
Despite being the "most commercially successful bandleader" of the second half of the 20th century and achieving immense record sales, Last's extravagant spending and "incompetent" financial advice led him at one stage to the "brink of ruin". He fell victim to a number of investment fraudsters, starting with his tax advisor. He bought oil rigs, wineries and cotton fields in the US as depreciation assets. When he wanted to visit his wineries in 1985, it turned out that none of the projects existed. As a result, the tax breaks ceased, and there were large additional claims. Last was barely prevented from selling his publishing rights. He took out a loan from the Hamburger Sparkasse and was not financially debt-free again until shortly before his 70th birthday.

== Illness, final tour and death ==
In September 2014 Last learned that a "life threatening" illness had worsened (the exact details were never disclosed), and in early 2015 he announced his retirement from touring would take place following a final "goodbye tour", which commenced in Germany and ended in London. He died less than three months later, on 9 June 2015 in Florida at the age of 86.

Writing in The Independent, Spencer Leigh suggested that Last's Non-Stop Dancing albums "paved the way for disco and dance mixes". Asked if he minded being labelled the "King of Corn", Last reportedly replied "No, because it is true."

== Awards ==
List of awards:

- MIDEM-Trophy, Cannes for 1 million non Stop Dancing records.
- Deutscher Schallplattenpreis from Fono Forum for the new arrangement of Bertholt Brecht's Dreigroschenoper.
- Europa – Europawelle Saar.
- Goldenes Grammophon, Munich.
- Silber Möwe, Hamburg.
- Gold Leaf Award (Canada) for Super Non Stop Dancing.
- Gold Leaf Award (Canada) for James Dos His Thing.
- Gold Award, Record World Top German Orchestra.
- Country Musik Award, (ASCAO) for When The Snow Is On The Rose.
- ASCAP Award for Elvis Presley recording of Fool.
- Goldene Westfalenhalle.
- Goldener Notenschlüssel from the German Music Publisher Sikorski.
- Ehrenlöwe from Radio Luxembourg.
- Star Of The Year Trophy from Music Week and Billboard, London.
- Robert Stolz-Preis from the Robert-Stolz-Stiftung.
- Bundesverdienstkreuz am Bande from the German President Walter Scheel.
- Die Goldene Kamera – Hörzu.
- Award from Cashbox for The Seduction for the best instrumental production of the year.
- Special-Prize for 52 Chart-Albums, Great Britain.
- Goldene Stimmgabel from ZDF 1991.
- Goldene Eins 1994.
- Echo 1994 Life Award 1995.
- Goldene Europa 1998.

== Discography ==
Productions of James Last: (As Hans Last, Orlando and James Last)

=== Studio albums ===
- Die gab's nur einmal (1963)
- Die gab's nur einmal 2 (1964)
- Musikalische Liebesträume (1965)
- Continental Tango (1965)
- Non Stop Dancing '65 (1965)
- Hammond À Gogo (1965)
- Non Stop Dancing '66 (1965)
- Beat in Sweet (1965)
- Ännchen von Tharau bittet zum Tanz (1966)
- Trumpet À Gogo (1966)
- Hammond À Gogo Vol. II (1966)
- Instrumentals Forever (1966)
- Classics Up to Date (1966)
- Non Stop Dancing '66/II (1966)
- Christmas Dancing (1966)
- Sax À Gogo (1967)
- Non Stop Dancing '67 (1967)
- That's Life (1967)
- Games That Lovers Play (1967)
- Non Stop Dancing '67/2 (1967)
- Trumpet À Gogo Vol. 2 (1967)
- James Last Presents George Walker (James Last and George Walker) (1967)
- Piano À Gogo (1968)
- Guitar À Gogo (1968)
- Humba Humba À Gogo (1968)
- Non Stop Dancing '68 (1968)
- Trumpet À Gogo 3 (1968)
- Non Stop Dancing 7 (1968)
- Rock Around With Me! (1968)
- Käpt'n James bittet zum Tanz (1968)
- Sekai Wa Futari No Tameni (1968) (only in Japan)
- Die Dreigroschenoper (1968) (3 box LP)
- Non Stop Dancing 8 (1969)
- Hammond à Gogo 3 (1969)
- Op klompen (1969)
- Ännchen von Tharau bittet zum Tanz 2 (1969)
- Hair (1969)
- Non Stop Dancing 9 (1969)
- Happy Lehar (1969)
- Non Stop Evergreens (1969)
- Classics Up to Date Vol.2 (1969)
- Onder Moeders Paraplu (1969)
- Golden Non Stop Dancing 10 (1970) (jubilee edition as LP box)
- Around the World (1970) (3 box LP)
- Beachparty (1970)
- America Album (1970) (promo edition, not officially released until 2012)
- With Compliments (1970)
- Non Stop Dancing 11 (1970)
- Käpt'n James bittet zum Tanz — Vol. 2 (1971)
- In Scandinavia (1971)
- Happyning (1971)
- Non Stop Dancing 12 (1971)
- Last of Old England (1971)
- Beachparty 2 (1971)
- Non Stop Dancing 1972 (1971) (Non Stop Dancing 13)
- Polka Party (1971)
- In Concert (1971)
- Music from Across the Way (1971)
- Voodoo Party (1971)
- Wenn die Elisabeth mit... James Last (1972)
- Non Stop Dancing 1972/2 (1972)
- Love Must Be The Reason (1972)
- Beachparty 3 (1972)
- Russland zwischen Tag und Nacht (1972)
- Polka Party II (1972)
- Non Stop Dancing 1973 (1972)
- Classics (1973)
- Sing mit (1973)
- Happy Hammond (1973)
- Non Stop Dancing 1973/2 (1973)
- Beachparty 4 (1973)
- Weihnachten & James Last (1973)
- Käpt'n James auf allen Meeren (1973)
- Non Stop Dancing 1974 (1973)
- Sing mit 2 (1974)
- In Wien beim Wein (1974)
- Non Stop Dancing 1974/2 (1974)
- Beachparty 5 (1974)
- Polka Party 3 (1974)
- Violins in Love (1974)
- Classics Up to Date 3 (1974)
- Sing mit 3 (1975)
- Non Stop Dancing 20 (jubilee-edition) (1975) ("Non Stop Dancing '65" new recording)
- In the Mood for Trumpets (1975)
- Well Kept Secret (1975)
- Tulpen uit Amsterdam (1975)
- Rock Me Gently (1975) (England & Canada only)
- Beachparty 6 (1975)
- Non Stop Dancing 1976 (1975)
- Stars im Zeichen eines guten Sterns (1975)
- Sing mit 4 (1976)
- Freut Euch des Lebens (1976)
- Happy Summer Night (1976)
- Non Stop Dancing 1976/2 (1976)
- Happy Marching (1976)
- Classics Up to Date 4 (1976)
- Non Stop Dancing 1977 (1976)
- Sing mit 5 (1976)
- James Last spielt Robert Stolz (1977)
- Auf Last geht's los (1977)
- Western Party and Square Dance (1977)
- Russland Erinnerungen (1977)
- Sing mit 6 – von Hamburg bis Mexico (1977)
- Non Stop Dancing 78 – Folge 25 (1978)
- Auf Last geht's los – Folge 2 (1978)
- World Hits (1978)
- Classics Up to Date 5 (1978)
- New Non Stop Dancing '79 (1978)
- Copacabana Happy Dancing (1979)
- James Last and the Rolling Trinity (1979)
- Non Stop Hansi (1979) (for his 50th birthday — not for sale)
- Hereinspaziert zur Polka Party (1979)
- Paintings (1979) (Japan only)
- Ein festliches Konzert zur Weihnachtszeit (1979)
- The Non Stop Dancing Sound of the 80's (1979)
- Sing mit 7 – Die Party für das ganze Jahr (1980)
- Romantische Träume (1980)
- Seduction (1980)
- Caribbean Nights (1980)
- Non Stop Dancing '81 (1980)
- Rosen aus dem Süden (1980)
- Die schönsten Melodien der letzten 100 Jahre (1980)
- Sing mit 8 ... und ab geht die Feuerwehr! (1981)
- Ännchen von Tharau bittet zum Träumen (1981)
- Tango (1981)
- Hansimania (1981)
- Non Stop Dancing '82 – Hits Around the World (1982)
- Sing mit 9 – Lass' die Puppen tanzen (1982)
- Jahrhundertmelodien (1982)
- Biscaya (1982)
- Nimm mich mit Käpt'n James auf die Reise (1982)
- Paradiesvogel (1982)
- Sing mit 10 – Wir wollen Spass! (1982)
- Non Stop Dancing '83 – Party Power (1983)
- Erinnerungen (1983)
- James Last spielt die grössten Songs von The Beatles (1983)
- The Rose of Tralee (1983)
- Superlast (1983)
- Classics Up to Date Vol.6 (1984)
- James Last im Allgäu (In the Alps) (1984)
- Paradiso (1984)
- James Last at St. Patrick's Cathedral, Dublin (1984)
- James Last in Scotland (1984)
- Non Stop Dancing '85 (1984)
- Für alle! (Leave the Best to Last) (1985)
- Viva Vivaldi (1985)
- Swing mit (1985)
- Deutsche Vita (1986)
- In Ireland (1986)
- Plus (James Last & Astrud Gilberto) (1986)
- Alles hat ein Ende nur die Wurst hat zwei (1987)
- James Last in Holland (1987)
- James Last spielt Bach (1987)
- Flute Fiesta (James Last & Berdien Stenberg) (1988)
- Dance, Dance, Dance (1988)
- James Last spielt Mozart (1988)
- Happy Heart (1989)
- Wir spielen wieder Polka (1989)
- Lieder (James Last & René Kollo) (1989)
- Classics By Moonlight (1990)
- James Last in Holland 2 (1990)
- Traummelodien (James Last & Richard Clayderman) (1990)
- Pop Symphonies (1991)
- Serenaden (James Last & Richard Clayderman) (1991)
- Viva España (1992)
- James Last in Holland 3 (1992)
- Frieden (Peace) (1992)
- James Last spielt Andrew Lloyd Webber (1993)
- Christmas Eve (James Last & Engelbert Humperdinck) (1994)
- Dein ist mein ganzes Herz (James Last & Milva) (1994)
- In Harmony (James Last & Richard Clayderman) (1995)
- Beach Party '95 (1995)
- My Soul – Best of Motown (1995)
- Classics from Russia (1996)
- Macarena (1996)
- Pop Symphonies 2 (1997)
- Country Roads (1998)
- James Last & Friends (1998)
- Happy Birthday (1999)
- Ocean Drive (2001)
- James Last Plays ABBA (2001)
- New Party Classics (2002)
- Elements of James Last Vol.1 (2004)
- They Call Me Hansi (2004)
- America Album (2012) (Official release of the 1970 promo album)

=== Live albums ===
- Freddy Live (1968) (live concert with Freddy Quinn)
- Live in Copenhagen (1970) (bootleg based on radio broadcast, not official release)
- James Last Live (1974) (2 LP-album)
- Live in Hannover (1976) (bootleg based on radio broadcast, not official release)
- Live in London (1978) (2 LP-album)
- Live in London (1979) (bootleg based on radio broadcast, not official release)
- Live in Tokyo (1979) (bootleg based on radio broadcast, not official release)
- The Berlin-Concert '87 (1987)
- Live at the Royal Albert Hall (1990) (bootleg based on radio broadcast, not official release)
- The Best of Live on Tour (1998)
- Concerts (1999)
- Gentleman of Music (2000)
- A World of Music (2002)
- Live in Europe (2006)
- Live at the Royal Albert Hall (released as 1 DVD-edition and 2 CD-edition) (2008)
- Music is My World (2011) (first three tracks only; the rest is a compilation of old studio recordings)

=== Soundtracks ===
- Morning's at Seven (1968)
- When Sweet Moonlight Is Sleeping in the Hills (1969)
- The Captain (1971)
- Schwarzwaldfahrt aus Liebeskummer (1974)
- Grenzenloses Himmelblau (1985)
- Traumschiff-Melodien (1986)
- Lorentz & Söhne (1988)
- Why Men Don't Listen and Women Can't Read Maps (2007)

=== Singles (selection) ===
- Tricks in Rhythm (1959) (EP, single)
- "Midnight in December" (1966) (single)
- "The Lonely Shepherd" with Gheorghe Zamfir (1977) (single) (used in a number of films)

=== Compilation albums (selection) ===
- Fanfare (1967)
- Does His Thing (Happy Music) (1970)
- El Condor Pasa (1971)
- In Concert 2 (1971)
- Super Non-Stop Dancing (1972)
- Olé (1973)
- Stereo Spectacular (1973)
- Il Y A Toujours Du Soleil (Golden Hearts) (James Last & Richard Clayderman) (1990)
- Country Cousins (1992)
- Best of Kapt'n James (1998)
- Classics Up to Date 8 (1998)
- Sólo Éxitos (Polydor 543 686-2 Venezuela 2001)
- Die schönsten TV- und Filmmelodien (2006)
- In Los Angeles (Well Kept Secret 1975) (2008)
- Eighty Not Out (released as a 3-CD edition) (2010)
- Gold Top 100 (Brunswick 5CD 533 240-1 DE 2011)
- The Complete Collection (Universal 8CD 533 347-4 IT 2011)
- Glanzlichter (Koch Universal 277 198-4 DE 2011)
- Classic Christmas (Spectrum Music SPEC 2083 UK 2011)
- Christmas With Romance (Universal 533 619-2 IT 2011)
- Voodoo-Party / Well Kept Secret (Vocalion 2on1 CDSML 8477 UK 2011)
- My Personal Favourites (Polydor 2CD 470 979-9 DE 2014)
- Happy Summer Night / Rock Me Gently (Vocalion 2on1 CDLK 4539 UK 2014)
- World Hits / Hair (Vocalion 2CD CDSML 8507 UK 2014)
- Beachparty (Polydor 4CD 472 433-2 DE 2015)
- Dancing à gogo (Polydor 4CD 472 544-1 DE 2015)
- Silver Collection (RISA / Force10Music / Universal BUDCD 1400 (435 399–0) ZA 2015)
- Ich find' Schlager toll (Polydor 536 934 4 DE 2016)

== Chart positions ==
=== Albums ===
Chart positions for James Last's albums
Title	Peak chart positions		
Title	NO	SWE	US
Piano à gogo	12	—	—
Non Stop Dancing '67/2	11	—	—
Non Stop Dancing '68	16	—	—
Non Stop Dancing 10	10	—	—
Beachparty	16	—	—
Non Stop Dancing 11	20	—	—
Classics Up To Date	21	—	—
Classics Up To Date Vol. 2	18	—	—
Beachparty 2	16	—	—
Non Stop Dancing 1972	12	—	—
Non Stop Dancing 1972 14	14	—	—
Beachparty 3	12	—	—
Beachparty 4	16	—	—
Non Stop Dancing 2/1974	19	—	—
In Harmony	30	—	—
Music From Across The Way	—	—	160
Russland Erinnerungen	—	43	—
The Gentleman of Music	37	19	—

=== Singles ===
Chart positions for James Last's singles
Title	Peak chart positions			
Title	UK	US AC	CAN	CAN AC
"El Condor Pasa"	—	—	46	—
"Music From Across The Way"	—	18	28	2
"Heart Of Gold"	—	—	—	17
"Washington Square" / "Proud Mary"	—	22	—	—
"Washington Square"	—	38	—	—
"Seduction (Love Theme)"	48	—	32	36

== See also ==
- James Last Orchestra
